= John Mollo =

British costume designer

- Born: 18 March 1931; London, England
- Died: 25 October 2017 (aged 86); Froxfield, Wiltshire, England
- Occupations: Costume designer; writer
- Years active: 1970–2003
- Spouses: Ann Farquharson (m. 1956; div. 1966); Louise Pongracz (m. 1968)
- Children: 1
- Relatives: Andrew Mollo (brother)

John Mollo (18 March 1931 – 25 October 2017) was a British costume designer and writer on the history of the military uniform. He was best known for creating the costumes for epic space opera films Star Wars (1977) and its sequel The Empire Strikes Back (1980). His accolades include two Academy Awards, in addition to nominations for four BAFTA Film Awards, a BAFTA Television Award, and three Emmy Awards.

== Biography ==
Mollo was born in London on 18 March 1931. His father was Eugene Simonovitch Mollo, a Russian immigrant who had escaped Russia in the 1920s, and his mother was Ella Clara Mollo (née Cockell). Eugene Mollo had started his own company that specialised in spraying cement. He was a collector of tin soldiers and military insignia and he wrote a book, Russian Military Swords, 1801–1917. Eugene was also a noted illustrator, and some of his drawings are now held in the Victoria and Albert Museum in London. John Mollo followed his father's interest in military history and developed a particular interest in military uniforms from a very young age. He recalled being especially inspired when he saw the 1935 film Clive of India as a child and returned home from the cinema to draw the costume of King George II. John Mollo was educated at Charterhouse School and then went on to study at the Farnham School of Art in Surrey. After World War II, he was conscripted to do his national service in the King's Shropshire Light Infantry in Hong Kong.

Mollo's first marriage was to Ann Farquharson who worked as a set decorator on films such as The French Lieutenant's Woman (1981) and Rob Roy (1995). In 1968 he married Louise Pongracz. The son of this second marriage, Tom Mollo, served as a captain in the Coldstream Guards and as equerry to Queen Elizabeth II.

He died on 25 October 2017, aged 86.

== Career ==
Mollo's illustrated chart of characters for the Mos Eisley Cantina scene in Star Wars (1977)

Mollo's interest in military uniform shaped his career and he became a respected authority on European and American uniforms. He wrote several carefully researched books on European and American military uniform, including Uniforms of the American Revolution (1975) and Into the Valley of Death: The British Cavalry Division at Balaclava 1854, often in collaboration with his brother Boris and with illustrator Malcolm McGregor.

Mollo's specialist knowledge put him in demand as an advisor to war film productions. He was engaged as advisor for the movies Charge of the Light Brigade (1966), Nicholas and Alexandra (1971) and on Stanley Kubrick's Barry Lyndon (1975), ensuring the historical accuracy of the military uniforms worn by actors.

Mollo subsequently moved into costume design. For his first film, Mollo unexpectedly found himself working not on a historical military drama but in a genre he had no knowledge of: science fiction. He was commissioned in 1975 by a young filmmaker named George Lucas to devise uniforms and outfits for a fantasy space war film, Star Wars. When asked at the time by a friend about the project, Mollo said that he thought it was a "sort of a space western and one of the heroes is a dustbin". Lucas's project envisioned a cast of heroes battling an evil Galactic Empire, and he briefed Mollo to design costumes that would not resemble the stereotypical "spacey" look of earlier science fiction productions such as Flash Gordon — " I don't want the audience to notice any of the costumes. I just want to see light versus dark." The aim was to make Lucas's fantasy universe appear authentic – Mollo considered that his total ignorance of science fiction was advantageous in achieving this. Lucas provided Mollo with sketches and concept art by Ralph McQuarrie to work from, working McQuarrie's designs for Imperial stormtroopers and the malevolent character of Darth Vader into functional costumes for actors to wear. McQuarrie's image of Darth Vader had developed from Samurai armour, and Mollo built up a costume using a combination of clerical robes, a motorcycle suit, a German military helmet and a gas mask from Bermans and Nathans costumiers in Camden Town. Mollo intentionally designed the uniforms of Imperial officers to resemble German Nazi officers' uniforms; by contrast, the heroes of the film were dressed in costumes resembling Wild West outfits. One of Mollo's biggest challenges on Star Wars was to create a plethora of exotic aliens to feature in the Mos Eisley Cantina scene. Mollo worked with George Lucas to compile a chart of visual designs for a range of character types. He collaborated with make-up artist Stuart Freeborn, who designed the masks and prosthetics to match each of the costumes, along with Doug Beswick, Rick Baker and Phil Tippett.

Mollo was surprised by the success of Star Wars, and in 1978 he won an Academy Award for Costume Design. In his acceptance speech at the Oscars ceremony, he said that the Star Wars costumes were "really not so much costumes as a bit of plumbing and general automobile engineering."

Mollo went on to work as advisor on more conventional military films such as Zulu Dawn. He also designed costumes for the crew of the Nostromo spacecraft in Ridley Scott's Alien (1979), and he returned to the Star Wars universe to work with Irvin Kershner on the 1980 sequel, The Empire Strikes Back. His work on Richard Attenborough's Gandhi (1983) involved designing historically accurate British military uniforms as well as Ben Kingsley's loincloth for the title role, and for this production he won his second Oscar, jointly with Bhanu Athaiya. Mollo's other credits include Greystoke: The Legend of Tarzan, Lord of the Apes (1984), Attenborough's Cry Freedom (1987), and Chaplin (1992).

Mollo's costume design for Star Wars

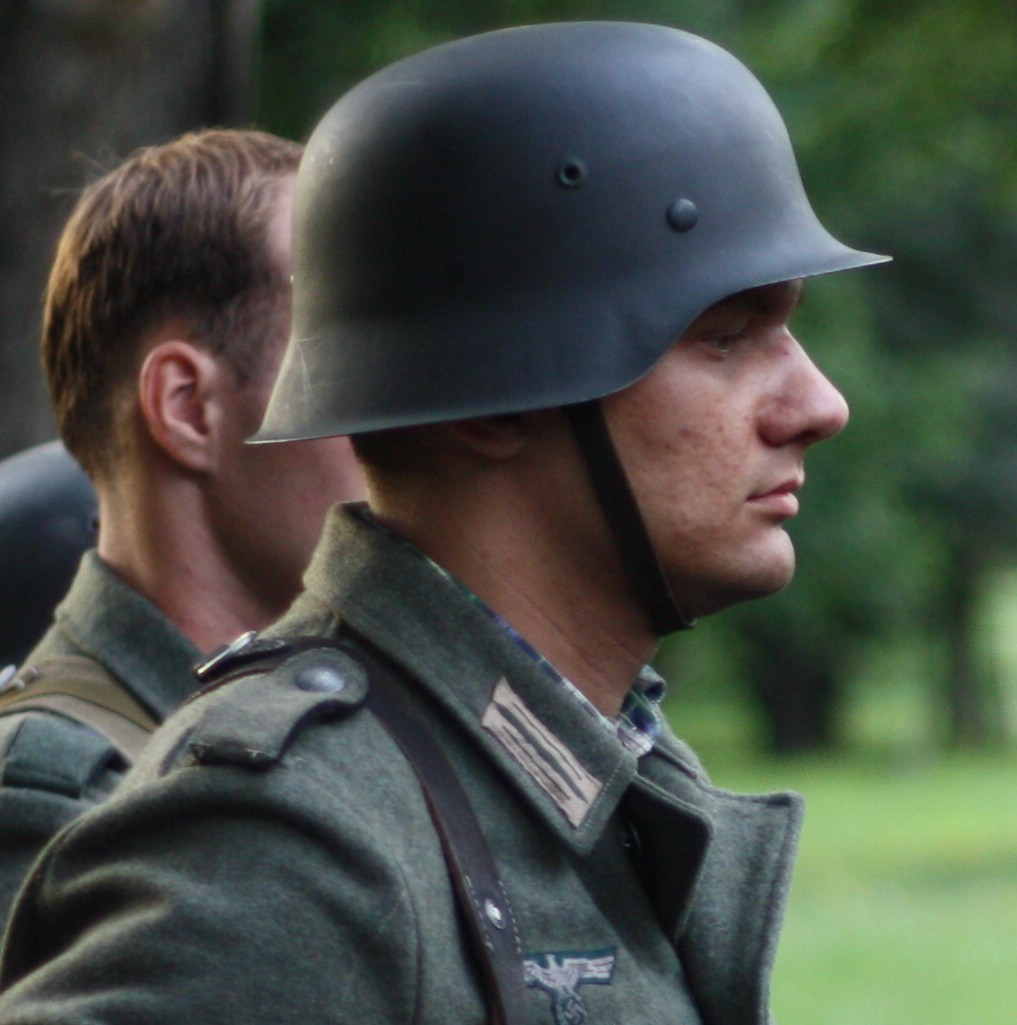
Mollo adapted German military helmets to create his Darth Vader costume

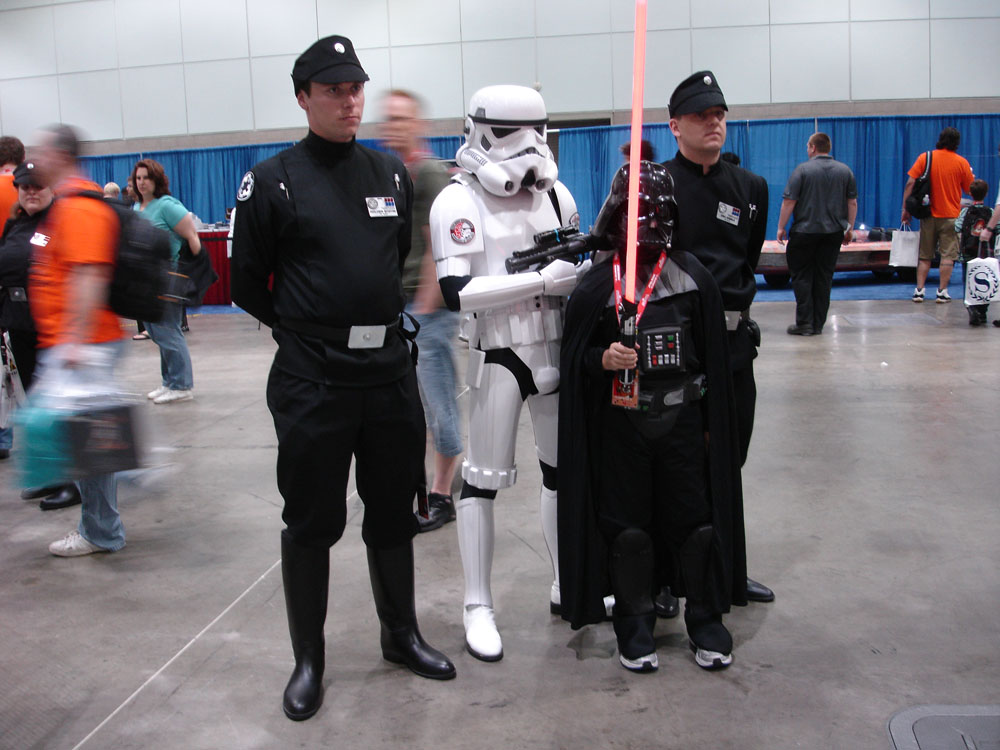
Mollo's Nazi-inspired Imperial uniforms for Star Wars (seen here in fan cosplay)

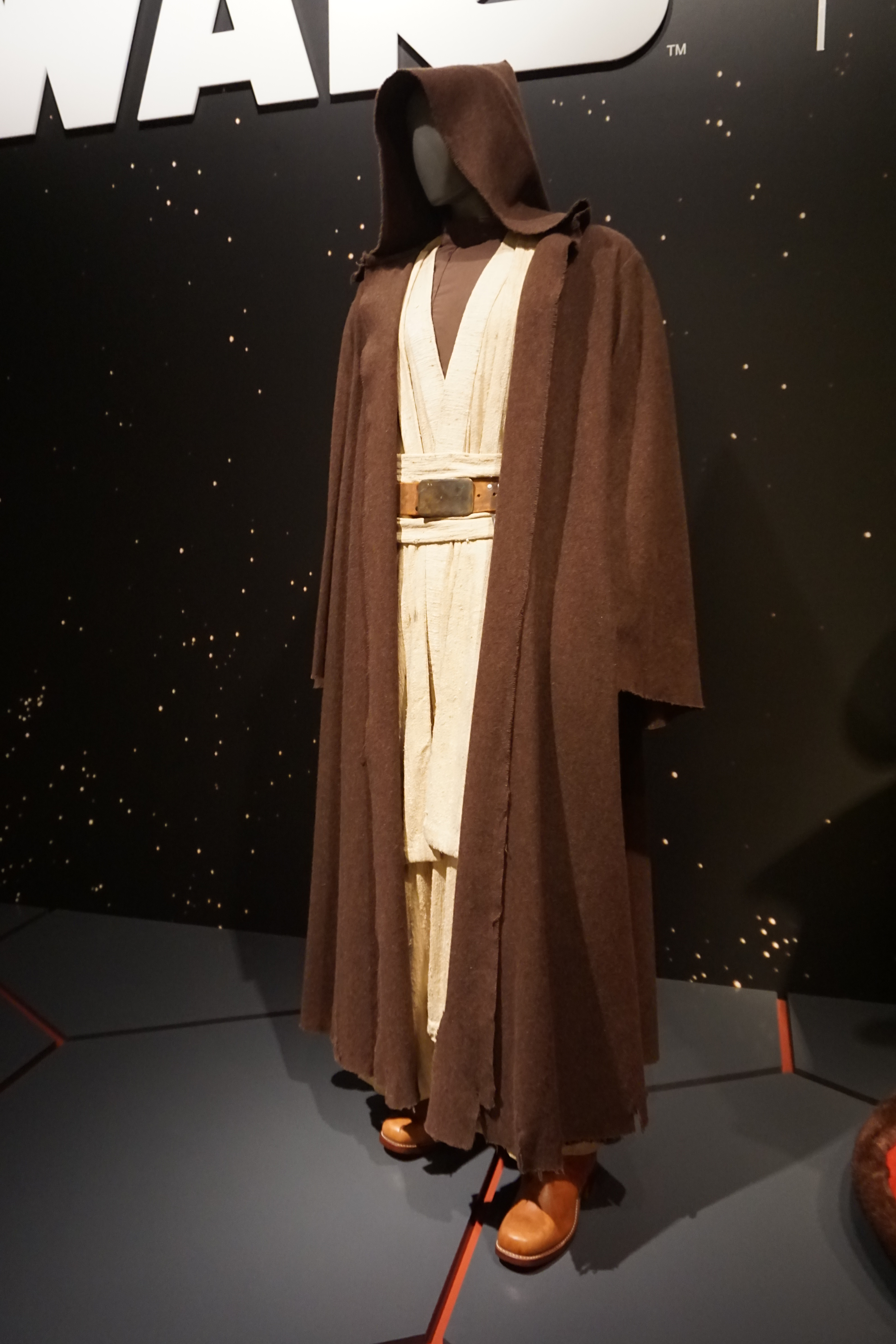
Mollo's robes for Obi-Wan Kenobi

== Filmography ==
=== Film ===
Year	Title	Director	Notes
1977	Star Wars	George Lucas	
1979	Alien	Ridley Scott	
1980	The Empire Strikes Back	Irvin Kershner	
1981	Outland	Peter Hyams	
1982	Gandhi	Richard Attenborough	with Bhanu Athaiya
1983	The Lords of Discipline	Franc Roddam	
1984	Greystoke: The Legend of Tarzan, Lord of the Apes	Hugh Hudson	
1985	King David	Bruce Beresford	
1985	Revolution	Hugh Hudson	
1987	Cry Freedom	Richard Attenborough	
1988	Hanna's War	Menahem Golan	
1990	White Hunter Black Heart	Clint Eastwood	
1990	Air America	Roger Spottiswoode	
1992	Chaplin	Richard Attenborough	with Ellen Mirojnick
1993	The Three Musketeers	Stephen Herek	
1994	The Jungle Book	Stephen Sommers	
1997	Event Horizon	Paul W. S. Anderson	

=== Television ===
Year	Title	Notes
1987	Mister Corbett's Ghost	Television film
1993	Sharpe	2 episodes
1998–2003	Hornblower	8 episodes

== Awards and nominations ==
Award	Year (Note: Indicates the year of ceremony. Each year is linked to the article about the awards held that year, wherever possible.)	Category	Work	Result	Ref.
Academy Awards	1978	Best Costume Design	Star Wars	Won	
Academy Awards	1983	Best Costume Design	Gandhi	Won	
British Academy Film Awards	1979	Best Costume Design	Star Wars	Nominated	
British Academy Film Awards	1980	Best Costume Design	Alien	Nominated	
British Academy Film Awards	1983	Best Costume Design	Gandhi	Nominated	
British Academy Film Awards	1993	Best Costume Design	Chaplin	Nominated	
British Academy Television Craft Awards	1999	Best Costume Design	Hornblower: The Even Chance	Nominated	
Primetime Emmy Awards	1999	Outstanding Costuming for a Miniseries or a Special	Horatio Hornblower: The Wrong War	Nominated	
Primetime Emmy Awards	2001	Outstanding Costuming for a Miniseries or a Special	Horatio Hornblower: Mutiny	Nominated	
Primetime Emmy Awards	2004	Outstanding Costuming for a Miniseries or a Special	Horatio Hornblower: Loyalty	Nominated	
Saturn Awards	1978	Best Costume Design	Star Wars	Won	
Saturn Awards	1981	Best Costume Design	The Empire Strikes Back	Nominated	
Saturn Awards	1985	Best Costume Design	Greystoke: The Legend of Tarzan, Lord of the Apes	Nominated	

== Publications ==
Mollo's books documented the history of military uniform in particular theatres of war such as the American Revolution, the Seven Years' War and the Crimean War.

- Mollo, John (1972). Military Fashion: A Comparative History of the Uniforms of the Great Armies from the 17th Century to the First World War. Putnam.
- Mollo, John (1975). Uniforms of the American Revolution in color (1st American ed.). New York: Macmillan. ISBN 9780025855809. Illustrated by Malcolm McGregor.
- Mollo, John (1977). Uniforms of the Seven Years War, 1756-1763, in color. Hippocrene Books. ISBN 9780882544441. Illustrated by Malcolm McGregor
- Mollo, Boris; Mollo, John (1991). Into the Valley of Death: the British Cavalry Division at Balaclava, 1854. London: Windrow & Greene. ISBN 9781872004754. Illustrated by Bryan Fosten
- Miller, AE Haswell (2013). Mollo, John (ed.). Vanished Armies: A Record of Military Uniform Observed and Drawn in Various European Countries During the Years 1907 to 1914. Bloomsbury Publishing. ISBN 9780747813118.

== See also ==
- List of Star Wars artists
- List of military writers
- Military history
