= Satellite Award for Best Miniseries =

Discontinued annual television award

- Awarded for: Best Miniseries
- Country: United States
- Presented by: International Press Academy
- First award: 1999
- Currently held by: Under the Banner of Heaven (2022)

The Satellite Award for Best Miniseries is one of the annual Satellite Awards given by the International Press Academy.

In 2016, the IPA merged the television film and miniseries categories as Best Miniseries or Television Film, but the merged category was discontinued the following year.

== Winners and nominees ==
=== 1990s ===
Year	Winners and nominees	Director	Network(s)
1999	Hornblower: The Even Chance	Andrew Grieve	A&E / ITV
1999	Bonanno: A Godfather's Story	Michel Poulette	Showtime
1999	Joan of Arc	Christian Duguay	CBS
1999	P.T. Barnum	Simon Wincer	A&E
1999	Purgatory	Uli Edel	TNT

=== 2000s ===
Year	Winners and nominees	Director	Network(s)
2000	American Tragedy	Lawrence Schiller	CBS
2000	The Beach Boys: An American Family	Jeff Bleckner	ABC
2000	The Corner	Charles S. Dutton	HBO
2000	Jason and the Argonauts	Nick Willing	NBC
2000	Sally Hemings: An American Scandal	Charles Haid	CBS
2001	Life with Judy Garland: Me and My Shadows	Robert Allan Ackerman	ABC
2001	Anne Frank: The Whole Story	Robert Dornhelm	ABC
2001	Band of Brothers	David Frankel, Mikael Salomon, et al.	HBO
2001	Further Tales of the City	Pierre Gang	Showtime
2001	Uprising	Jon Avnet	NBC
2002	Taken	Tobe Hooper, et al.	Sci-Fi Channel
2002	The Forsyte Saga	Christopher Menaul and David Moore	ITV / PBS
2002	Living with the Dead	Stephen Gyllenhaal	CBS
2002	Master Spy: The Robert Hanssen Story	Lawrence Schiller	CBS
2002	Shackleton	Charles Sturridge	A&E / Channel 4
2003	Angels in America	Mike Nichols	HBO
2003	Doctor Zhivago	Giacomo Campiotti	ITV / PBS
2003	Frank Herbert's Children of Dune	Greg Yaitanes	Sci-Fi Channel
2003	Helen of Troy	John Kent Harrison	USA Network
2003	Hornblower: Loyalty	Andrew Grieve	A&E
2003	Out of Order	Henry Bromell, Tim Hunter, Roger Kumble, and Wayne Powers	Showtime
2004	The Lost Prince	Stephen Poliakoff	BBC One / PBS
2004	The 4400	Scott Peters, et al.	USA Network
2004	American Family	Charles Burnett, Barbara Martinez Jitner, and Gregory Nava	PBS
2004	Charles II: The Power and the Passion	Joe Wright	A&E / BBC One
2004	Prime Suspect 6: The Last Witness	Tom Hooper	ITV / PBS
2004	The Second Coming	Adrian Shergold	ITV
2005	Elvis	James Steven Sadwith	CBS
2005	Agatha Christie's Marple	Charles Palmer, Andy Wilson, et al.	UPN
2005	Empire Falls	Robert Dornhelm, et al.	HBO
2005	Into the West	Tom Hooper	TNT
2005	Revelations	Lili Fini Zanuck	NBC
2005	The Virgin Queen	Coky Giedroyc	BBC One / PBS
2006	To the Ends of the Earth	David Attwood	BBC Two / PBS
2006	Bleak House	Justin Chadwick and Susanna White	BBC One / PBS
2006	Casanova	Sheree Folkson	BBC Three
2006	Elizabeth I	Tom Hooper	HBO
2006	Thief	John David Coles, Paul McGuigan, and Dean White	USA Network
2007	The Amazing Mrs Pritchard	Simon Curtis, Declan Lowney, and Catherine Morshead	BBC One / PBS
2007	The Company	Mikael Salomon	TNT
2007	Five Days	Otto Bathurst, Simon Curtis, Toby Haynes, and Peter Hoar	BBC One / HBO
2007	Jane Eyre	Susanna White	BBC One / PBS
2007	The Starter Wife	Jon Avnet	USA Network
2008	Cranford	Simon Curtis and Steve Hudson	BBC One / PBS
2008	John Adams	Tom Hooper	HBO
2008	The Last Enemy	Iain B. MacDonald	BBC One / PBS
2009	Little Dorrit	Diarmuid Lawrence, Adam Smith, and Dearbhla Walsh	BBC One / PBS
2009	Collision	Marc Evans	ITV / PBS / STV / UTV
2009	Diamonds	Andy Wilson	ABC
2009	The Prisoner	Nick Hurran	AMC
2009	Wallander	Benjamin Caron, Philip Martin, et al.	BBC One / PBS

=== 2010s ===
Year	Winners and nominees	Director	Network(s)
2010	Sherlock	Nick Hurran, Paul McGuigan, et al.	BBC One / PBS
2010	Carlos	Olivier Assayas	Sundance Channel
2010	Emma	Jim O'Hanlon	BBC One / PBS
2010	The Pacific	Jeremy Podeswa, Tim Van Patten, et al.	HBO
2010	The Pillars of the Earth	Sergio Mimica-Gezzan	Starz
2010	Small Island	John Alexander	BBC One / PBS
2014	Olive Kitteridge	Lisa Cholodenko	HBO
2014	24: Live Another Day	Jon Cassar, et al.	Fox
2014	Endeavour	Colm McCarthy	ITV / PBS / STV / UTV
2014	Fleming: The Man Who Would Be Bond	Mat Whitecross	BBC America / Sky Atlantic
2014	Happy Valley	Tim Fywell, Neasa Hardiman, and Euros Lyn	BBC One / Netflix
2014	The Honourable Woman	Hugo Blick	BBC Two / SundanceTV
2014	The Roosevelts	Ken Burns	PBS
2014	Sherlock	Nick Hurran, Paul McGuigan, et al.	BBC One / PBS
2014	The Spoils of Babylon	Matt Piedmont	IFC
2015	Flesh and Bone	Alik Sakharov, et al.	Starz
2015	The Book of Negroes	Clement Virgo	BET
2015	Saints & Strangers	Paul A. Edwards	Nat Geo
2015	Show Me a Hero	Paul Haggis	HBO
2015	Wolf Hall	Peter Kosminsky	BBC Two / PBS
2017	Big Little Lies	Jean-Marc Vallée	HBO
2017	Feud: Bette and Joan	Ryan Murphy, et al.	FX
2017	Guerrilla	Sam Miller and John Ridley	Showtime / Sky Atlantic
2017	Rillington Place	Craig Viveiros	BBC One / Sundance Now
2017	When We Rise	Gus Van Sant, et al.	ABC
2017	The Young Pope	Paolo Sorrentino	Canal+ / HBO / Sky Atlantic
2018	The Assassination of Gianni Versace: American Crime Story	Ryan Murphy, et al.	FX
2018	The Looming Tower	Alex Gibney, et al.	Hulu
2018	Patrick Melrose	Edward Berger	Showtime / Sky Atlantic
2018	Sharp Objects	Jean-Marc Vallée	HBO
2018	A Very English Scandal	Stephen Frears	BBC One / Amazon Prime Video
2019	Chernobyl	Johan Renck	HBO / Sky Atlantic
2019	The Act	Laure de Clermont-Tonnerre, et al.	Hulu
2019	Fosse/Verdon	Thomas Kail, et al.	FX
2019	Unbelievable	Lisa Cholodenko, et al.	Netflix
2019	When They See Us	Ava DuVernay	Netflix
2019	Years and Years	Simon Cellan Jones and Lisa Mulcahy	BBC One / HBO

=== 2020s ===
Year	Winners and nominees	Director	Network(s)
2020	The Good Lord Bird	Hughes brothers, et al.	Showtime
2020	Mrs. America	Anna Boden and Ryan Fleck, et al.	FX on Hulu
2020	Normal People	Lenny Abrahamson and Hettie Macdonald	Hulu
2020	The Queen's Gambit	Scott Frank	Netflix
2020	Small Axe	Steve McQueen	BBC One / Amazon Prime Video
2020	The Undoing	Susanne Bier	HBO
2020	Unorthodox	Maria Schrader	Netflix
2021	Mare of Easttown	Craig Zobel	HBO
2021	It's a Sin	Peter Hoar	Channel 4 / HBO Max
2021	Maid	John Wells, et al.	Netflix
2021	The North Water	Andrew Haigh	BBC Two / AMC+
2021	Time	Lewis Arnold	BBC One
2021	The Underground Railroad	Barry Jenkins	Prime Video
2022	Under the Banner of Heaven	David Mackenzie, et al.	FX on Hulu
2022	Dahmer – Monster: The Jeffrey Dahmer Story	Jennifer Lynch, et al.	Netflix
2022	The Ipcress File	James Watkins	AMC+
2022	This Is Going To Hurt	Lucy Forbes, Tom Kingsley	AMC+
2022	The Old Man	Jon Watts, et al.	FX
2022	Pachinko	Kogonada, Justin Chon	Apple TV+
2022	The Staircase	Antonio Campos	HBO Max
2022	We Own This City	Reinaldo Marcus Green	HBO
