= The Duchess and the Devil =

1999 episode of Hornblower

- Based on: Mr. Midshipman Hornblower, chapter "Hornblower, the Duchess, and the Devil" by C. S. Forester
- Screenplay by: Patrick Harbinson
- Starring: Ioan Gruffudd
- Country of origin: United Kingdom
- Original language: English

Production
- Editor: Keith Palmer

Original release
- Network: ITV
- Release: 24 February 1999

Related
- The Examination for Lieutenant; The Frogs and the Lobsters

The Duchess and the Devil is the third episode of the British television series Hornblower. The episode first aired on 24 February 1999 on ITV. The television story is loosely based on the chapter "Hornblower, the Duchess, and the Devil" in C. S. Forester's 1950 novel Mr. Midshipman Hornblower.

== Plot ==
Acting Lieutenant Horatio Hornblower captures the French ship Le Reve. On HMS Indefatigable, Captain Pellew orders Hornblower to sail his prize to Portsmouth with extremely important dispatches, and to destroy them if necessary to keep them out of enemy hands. They attend a dinner hosted by Sir Hew Dalrymple, the Governor of Gibraltar. Among the guests is the widowed Duchess of Wharfedale, who tells an entertaining story about how her father managed the Duke of Wharfedale's mills, leading to her marrying the elderly Duke and inheriting his fortune.

The Duchess requests and is granted passage on Hornblower's ship. As the journey starts, Le Reve is caught in a fog and sails into the middle of the Spanish fleet, which Hornblower mistakenly believed was anchored at Cádiz. Hornblower tries to sail past by pretending to be French, but a Spanish officer knows of Le Reve's capture by the British and the Spanish quickly surround her. Before being boarded, Hornblower reluctantly agrees to let the Duchess hide the dispatches on her person rather than destroy them.

Hornblower and his crew are imprisoned in a fortress commanded by Don Alfredo de Massaredo, while the Duchess is allowed to stay as Alfredo's guest. Hornblower is reunited with Archie Kennedy, whom Jack Simpson had previously set adrift while unconscious. (Note: As seen in episode one, The Even Chance.) Kennedy is a wreck after prolonged torture following multiple escape attempts. He confides to Hornblower that he recognizes the Duchess as Katherine "Kitty" Cobham, a London actress; they surmise that she resorted to deception so she could obtain passage home.

Alfredo arranges for the Duchess to travel aboard Almeria, a courier ship bound for Porto in neutral Portugal. Hornblower's crew chafes under his order to bide their time until Kennedy, who speaks Spanish, is well enough to escape with them. The crew also resents Hornblower's friendship with the Duchess and the attention Alfredo pays him as the ranking officer. Alfredo hosts Hornblower, the Duchess, and a visiting French officer, Colonel de Vergesse, at dinner. Vergesse indicates he knows the Duchess's true identity, and she seduces him so he will maintain his silence. When Hornblower questions her loyalty, she says she did what was necessary to preserve her alias and perform her patriotic duty of safeguarding the dispatches.

Some of the crew join hot-headed Midshipman Hunter in a premature escape attempt, and Hornblower orders the others to come to their aid. The escape fails, and Hunter is wounded. As the senior officer, Hornblower accepts blame and is forced to spend time in the same hole that previously held Kennedy, which is open to the elements and so small it does not permit a prisoner to sit or stand.

Soon after Hornblower's release, he witnesses a nighttime engagement between Almeria and Pellew's Indefatigable. During a storm, Almeria founders on the shoals. Hornblower volunteers himself and his crew to brave the rough seas and rescue those aboard Almeria, pledging his word of honor that they will return to the prison. Alfredo consents and a contrite Hunter insists on taking part, though his wound has not fully healed. Those saved include the Duchess and the injured captain of Almeria, whose rescue results in Hunter's death. Indefatigable rescues them the following morning.

On board Indefatigable, the Duchess returns the dispatches to Pellew, who informs Hornblower that he has been promoted to lieutenant for his bravery in the fireship attack on Gibraltar. (Note: As seen in The Examination for Lieutenant.) Hornblower asks permission to honor his pledge to Alfredo, and Pellew consents. Though Pellew considers Hornblower's men not bound by Hornblower's promise, they choose to preserve Hornblower's honor by returning with him. Indefatigable departs for England with the Duchess as a passenger, and before she leaves Hornblower promises to keep her secret and she pledges her permanent friendship. Soon after Hornblower and his men return to the prison, the King and Queen of Spain order them released in recognition of their gallantry and they are permitted to return home.

== Cast ==
- Ioan Gruffudd as Acting Lieutenant / Lieutenant Horatio Hornblower
- Robert Lindsay as Captain Sir Edward Pellew
- Cherie Lunghi as Katherine “Kitty” Cobham / the Duchess of Wharfedale
- Christopher Fulford as Midshipman Hunter
- Ronald Pickup as Don Massaredo
- Jamie Bamber as Midshipman Archie Kennedy
- Jonathan Coy as Lieutenant Bracegirdle
- John Woodvine as Sir Hew Dalrymple
- Paul Copley as Matthews
- Sean Gilder as Styles
- Jean-Yves Berteloot as Etienne de Vergasse
- Simon Sherlock as Oldroyd
- Vincent S. Boluda as Spanish Lieutenant
- Jolyon Baker as Captain Joubert
- Colin MacLachlan as Master Bowles
