= Mutiny (2001 film) =

- Written by: T. R. Bowen
- Directed by: Andrew Grieve
- Starring: Ioan Gruffudd
- Music by: John E. Keane
- Country of origin: United Kingdom
- Original language: English

Production
- Executive producer: Michele Buck
- Producer: Andrew Benson
- Cinematography: Chris O'Dell
- Editor: Keith Palmer
- Running time: 1:38

Original release
- Network: ITV
- Release: 24 March 2002

Related
- The Frogs and the Lobsters; Retribution

"Mutiny" is the fifth episode of the British film series Hornblower. It was released on April 8, 2001. It is based on the 1952 book Lieutenant Hornblower by C.S. Forester. "Mutiny" was written by T. R. Bowen and directed by Andrew Grieve.

== Plot ==
In 1802 in Kingston, Jamaica, Lieutenant Horatio Hornblower is imprisoned on a charge of mutiny. During a visit to his cell, Hornblower explains the circumstances to his former captain, Commodore Sir Edward Pellew.

In a six months flashback, Hornblower is third lieutenant aboard HMS Renown, under the command of the famous Captain James Sawyer, a hero from the Battle of the Nile and one of Admiral Nelson's band of brothers. The other officers are First Lieutenant Buckland, the newly arrived Second Lieutenant William Bush, and Fourth Lieutenant Archie Kennedy. Sawyer appears to be thinking and acting incoherently; he does not trust his officers, accuses them of conspiring against him, and treats them harshly.

After a trip to Plymouth, Renown is sent on a mission to Santo Domingo, then undergoing a slave rebellion, in order to deal with Spanish privateers that threaten British trade in the West Indies. Conditions worsen when Sawyer targets Midshipman Wellard and places Hornblower on a 36-hour watch for attempting to defend Wellard. Later, Sawyer gives the crew an extra ration of rum, which leaves them slow to respond when they suddenly sight two French frigates that threaten to rake Renown. Hornblower frightens them off by firing a stern chaser loaded with only powder and wadding, but Sawyer is again angry at what he sees as an unauthorized act. Sawyer has Wellard flogged while Hornblower watches, then orders Hornblower to resume his watch.

That night, Sawyer finds Hornblower asleep on watch, which is punishable by death under the Articles of War. Sawyer tells Hornblower, "I do believe your life is in my hands", offers Hornblower a pistol, and tells Hornblower to shoot him. Dr. Clive, a Sawyer loyalist, intervenes and leads the captain away.

Irrationally suspecting his officers are plotting against him, Sawyer extends Hornblower's watch another 36 hours and orders that the other lieutenants report to him every hour. Hornblower secretly meets with Buckland and Kennedy to consider declaring Sawyer unfit for command. Bush joins them. Gunner Hobbs, a loyal, longtime shipmate of Sawyer, informs the captain that the lieutenants are nowhere to be found. The captain calls out the Marines to search. Hornblower, Wellard, and Kennedy hide. As Sawyer closes in, they begin to reveal themselves, and Sawyer sees Kennedy. He starts to confront Kennedy, then suddenly falls or is pushed into the hold.

Sawyer suffers memory loss and Clive keeps him sedated to avoid revealing his increasingly erratic behavior. Buckland assumes command. Rumors begin to circulate that someone pushed Sawyer. Sawyer recovers from the fall and resumes command. Bush, Hornblower, and Kennedy are arrested for mutiny.

Renown arrives at Santo Domingo, only to find that the Spanish fort sits too high for the ship's guns to reach. She suffers heavy damage and casualties from the Spanish cannons but Sawyer insists on remaining and returning fire even though it is ineffective. Renown is grounded, the hold begins to flood, and Matthews releases the imprisoned lieutenants to save them from drowning. Clive finally deems Sawyer unfit, so Buckland takes charge and has the captain locked in his cabin. Hornblower and Bush execute a kedging maneuver that succeeds in freeing Renown from the rocks, during which Hornblower saves Bush from drowning, and Buckland then sails her out of cannon range.

Back in Kingston, Commodore Pellew asks Hornblower to explain further.

== Cast ==
- Ioan Gruffudd as 3rd Lieutenant Horatio Hornblower
- David Warner as Captain James Sawyer
- Nicholas Jones as 1st Lieutenant Buckland
- Paul McGann as 2nd Lieutenant William Bush
- Jamie Bamber as 4th Lieutenant Archie Kennedy
- Paul Copley as Matthews, Boatswain
- Sean Gilder as Styles, Boatswain's Mate
- Philip Glenister as Gunner Hobbs
- David Rintoul as Dr. Clive
- Terence Corrigan as Midshipman Wellard
- Gilly Gilchrist as Randall
- Paul Brightwell as Sergeant Whiting
- Robert Lindsay as Commodore Edward Pellew, 1st Viscount Exmouth
