= Retribution (2001 film) =

- Starring: Ioan Gruffudd
- Country of origin: United Kingdom
- Original language: English

Production
- Editor: Keith Palmer

Original release
- Network: ITV
- Release: 25 March 2002

Related
- Mutiny; Loyalty

"Retribution" is the sixth episode of the British film series Hornblower. It was released on 15 April 2001, the week after the fifth episode, "Mutiny", of which it is a continuation. It is based on the 1952 book Lieutenant Hornblower by C.S. Forester.

== Plot ==
In January 1802 in Kingston, Jamaica, Hornblower and of HMS Renown's other lieutenants, Buckland, Bush and Kennedy, face a court-martial on the charge of mutiny. The tribunal consists of Commodore Pellew, Captain Hammond, and Captain Collins. Pellew is very fond of Hornblower, his former subordinate, while Hammond views the lieutenant as an overambitious schemer.

Events flash back and forth between the circumstances of six months previous (which is also covered by the previous film, Mutiny) and the court-martial. After Sawyer's failed attack on the Spanish fort, Buckland wants to admit defeat and sail to Kingston, but Hornblower suggests they launch a surprise night assault on the fort by land and then trap the Spanish ships anchored in the bay beneath the fort. Thirty-three seamen, led by Randall, desert during the night. Because the desertion occurred under his command, Buckland tries to salvage his reputation by agreeing to Hornblower's plan. The landing force, led by Hornblower, Kennedy, and Bush, discovers the deserters all dead. Hornblower concludes they were killed not by the Spanish, but rebelling slaves.

A slave leader, "Colonel" Francois Lefanu, parlays with Buckland, admitting his men mistook the deserters for Spaniards. He demands the British leave Santo Domingo, asserting this is not their fight. Due to Buckland's blundering, a firefight begins accidentally. The shots alert the Spanish to the British attack. The landing party charges the fort, but is pinned down by heavy fire. Hornblower discovers a series of tunnels and leads some of the men inside; his quick thinking results in the capture of the fort. Using hot shot, the landing party fires the fort's cannons at three fleeing Spanish ships, disabling one.

After their victory, the British meet Colonel Francisco Manuel Ortega, the Spanish commander, who is strangely anxious to surrender the island, as long as the Spanish are allowed to board their ships and depart. The British soon discover why; the fort is under siege by the rebel slaves, and the Spanish are starving. At Hornblower's urging, Buckland stalls for time while a cannon is lifted up a cliff to where it can fire on the Spanish ships. Once they demonstrate that the Spanish ships are within range of the British cannon, Buckland obtains an unconditional surrender. Hobbs tries to free Sawyer, but fails. Hobbs then confronts Midshipman Wellard and accuses him of pushing Sawyer down the hold.

As the Spanish are surrendering, the slaves attack the fort. While evacuating the Spanish prisoners, Buckland orders Hornblower to blow up the fort and forbids anyone else to assist. Bush and Kennedy disobey Buckland's order to remain aboard Renown, and instead aid Hornblower to set off the explosion. The three lieutenants jump from a cliff and the cheering Renown crew recovers them. Buckland, clearly disappointed at Hornblower's survival, gives him command of the Spanish ships. Later that night, the Spanish prisoners try to seize Renown. The attempt fails, due in large part to Hornblower leading his crew back aboard Renown during the fighting. Sawyer and Wellard are killed and Bush and Kennedy injured.

The tribunal members are unimpressed with Buckland when they learn that during the Spanish attempt to seize Renown, he was surprised in bed and spent the fight tied up in his cabin. Desperate to save his career, Buckland rashly states that Sawyer became mentally unstable because Hornblower pushed him into the hold. Buckland calls on Hobbs to back him, but Hobbs states that he does not know how Sawyer was injured. During a recess, Pellew tells Hammond and Collins that instead of hanging Hornblower, they should promote him. Understanding the tribunal will blame someone for Sawyer's fall, and wanting to protect Hornblower, a dying Kennedy falsely tells the tribunal that he pushed Sawyer and acted alone.

Pellew tells Hornblower that one of the Spanish ships has been renamed HMS Retribution, that he has been promoted to commander, and that he is Retribution's new captain.

== Cast ==
- Ioan Gruffudd as 3rd Lieutenant/Commander Horatio Hornblower
- David Warner as Captain James Sawyer
- Nicholas Jones as 1st Lieutenant/Acting Captain Buckland
- Paul McGann as 2nd Lieutenant William Bush
- Jamie Bamber as 4th Lieutenant Archie Kennedy
- Paul Copley as Matthews, Boatswain
- Sean Gilder as Styles, Boatswain's Mate
- Philip Glenister as Gunner Hobbs
- David Rintoul as Dr. Clive
- Terence Corrigan as Midshipman Wellard
- Gilly Gilchrist as Randall
- Paul Brightwell as Sergeant Whiting
- Antonio Gil as Colonel Francisco Manuel Ortega
- Hugh Quarshie as Francois Lefanu
- Katia Caballero as Señora Ortega
- Robert Lindsay as Commodore Edward Pellew, 1st Viscount Exmouth
- Ian McElhinney as Captain Hammond
- John Castle as Captain Collins
