= Duty (film) =

- Starring: Ioan Gruffudd
- Country of origin: United Kingdom
- Original language: English

Production
- Editor: Keith Palmer

Original release
- Network: ITV
- Release: 6 January 2003

Related
- Loyalty

Duty is the eighth and final episode of the British TV series Hornblower, based on the 1962 book Hornblower and the Hotspur by C.S. Forester. It was released on 6 January 2003, a day after episode 7: Loyalty.

The series received four nominations for the 2004 56th Primetime Emmy Awards: Outstanding Miniseries, Outstanding Art Direction for a Miniseries or Movie, Outstanding Costumes for a Miniseries, Movie or a Special and Outstanding Single-Camera Sound Mixing for a Miniseries or Movie.

== Plot ==
Commander Horatio Hornblower, captain of HMS Hotspur, and Maria Mason are married. Admiral Pellew arrives and gives Hornblower his next mission: HMS Grasshopper, commanded by old friend Captain Bracegirdle, has gone missing while on patrol off the coast of France. Hornblower is to find her. Pellew gives Hornblower permission to sleep ashore so he can be with his bride on their honeymoon night.

The next day, Hornblower sets sail. As a wedding gift, Pellew gives Hornblower his steward, James Doughty, an accomplished cook, who replaces Styles. On a stormy night, Hotspur rescues the passengers of a small boat in danger of sinking off the coast of France, including a man claiming to be Swiss and his American wife. The man's strong French accent raises the suspicions of Hornblower and his crew. The American woman tells Hornblower that they saw a ship become stranded just to the north of them.

Hornblower finds Grasshopper grounded and much of the crew drowned. The rest were killed defending their captain from French troops. Hornblower and his men are attacked by French troops under Wolfe's command. (Note: Wolfe was exposed as a traitor in Loyalty.) They find Bracegirdle among the casualties, alive and distraught at the loss of his ship and crew. After rescuing Bracegirdle, they return to the waiting Hotspur.

Back in England, Pellew has received orders from the Admiralty to find a young couple, a Frenchman and the daughter of a wealthy American merchant, who are somewhere at sea near France. Off the French coast, Wolfe's French troops try but fail to take Hotspur, though Wolfe escapes. Under questioning by Hornblower, the "Swiss" passenger confesses he is Jérôme-Napoléon Bonaparte, the younger brother of Napoleon. Bracegirdle suggests returning to England, with their valuable passengers right away, but Hornblower chooses to complete Bracegirdle's original mission of investigating French military activities on shore. The crew, especially Styles, deeply resent their French passengers. Back in England, Pellew learns from a diplomatic service official that Napoleon's brother and his heiress wife are aboard Hotspur.

Hornblower, Bracegirdle, and their reconnaissance party discover quantities of French maritime cannons hidden ashore but cannot discern the reason. Bracegirdle goes off alone to find out more; he discovers why the cannons are hidden but is killed by the French before he can reach Hornblower with the information.

Hornblower reports to Pellew, who informs him that the diplomatic service has quarantined Hotspur to keep Jérôme-Napoléon's presence in England a secret: no one can disembark or board, captain included. Stranded on shore Hornblower takes the opportunity to spend three days with Maria.

Hornblower is then ordered to take Jérôme-Napoléon to France and to transfer his wife Betsy to another ship that will take her home to her father in America. Hornblower orders Doughty to make the couple a good meal. Doughty learns Styles has placed a dead rat in the stew he is taking them. This leads to a fistfight during which Doughty accidentally strikes Midshipman Orrock, an offense punishable by death according to the Articles of War. Doughty is clapped in irons.

Hornblower explains to Jérôme-Napoléon that he must go ashore alone. Jérôme reluctantly agrees in the hope of persuading his older brother to welcome his wife. The next day Hornblower and Bush go ashore and discover that the cannons they found earlier had been removed from three frigates anchored in a bay, freeing up enough space to transport 1,000 soldiers each. The plan is for Wolfe and 3,000 French soldiers to invade Ireland. Hornblower takes Hotspur through a dense fog in dangerously shallow water to attack the departing frigates. He fires upon and disables the first. The other two run aground and collide with each other. Wolfe falls onto Hotspur, where he is killed after trying to shoot Hornblower.

On Christmas Day, Hotspur rendezvous with Liberty, which will take Betsy to America. Hornblower summons Doughty to the captain's quarters, hints that Liberty is close enough for him to reach by swimming, then leaves him unguarded. Later, it is revealed that Napoleon is pressuring the Pope to annul his brother's marriage. Pellew informs Hornblower that he has been promoted; according to long-standing tradition, when a commander-in-chief retires, he is permitted to promote one midshipman, one lieutenant, and one commander. Pellew uses his third promotion to advance Hornblower from commander to post-captain. Hornblower receives further good news from Maria: she is pregnant.

== Cast ==
- Ioan Gruffudd as Commander/Captain Horatio Hornblower
- Robert Lindsay as Admiral/Admiral of the Fleet Pellew
- Paul McGann as 1st Lieutenant William Bush
- Paul Copley as Matthews, Boatswain
- Sean Gilder as Styles, Steward
- Lorcan Cranitch as Wolfe
- Tony Haygarth as Master Prowse
- Julia Sawalha as Maria Mason Hornblower
- Barbara Flynn as Mrs. Mason
- Ron Cook as Steward James Doughty
- Jonathan Forbes as Midshipman Charles Orrock
- Jonathan Coy as Captain Bracegirdle
- Jim Carter as Etheridge
- David Birkin as Jérôme
- Camilla Power as Betsy
- Timothy Deenihan as Maguire
- Richard Syms as Parson
