= Keith Palmer (film editor) =

British film editor (born 1942)

- Born: Keith Palmer
- Occupation: Film editor
- Years active: 1962 to 2005

Keith Palmer (born 1942) is a British film editor, best known for the Sharpe and Hornblower television movies, but active in feature films since the 1960s.

He won a Primetime Emmy Award in 1999.

Palmer began his career in 1962 as dubbing editor on Station Six-Sahara. Through the 1960s into the early 1970s he worked as a sound mixer or editor, on films including 30 Is a Dangerous Age, Cynthia (1967), Shalako (1968), The Strange Affair (1968), Hello-Goodbye (1970) and Wake in Fright (1971). In 1966 he was assistant editor on I Was Happy Here.

Palmer's first work as a full film editor came in 1969, on the first eight episodes of Strange Report, a new television drama series starring Anthony Quayle. His early films as an editor were I Start Counting (1970) and Nothing But the Night (1972), and he was also editor for the BBC television series Doomwatch (1972). Thereafter, Palmer almost invariably worked as editor, several times on films made by Peter Sasdy and Jack Gold. In 1987 an unusual challenge came with Escape from Sobibor.

In 1999 Palmer received the Primetime Emmy Award (Outstanding Single Camera Picture Editing for a Miniseries or a Movie) for Hornblower: The Even Chance (1998), and for the same movie he was also nominated for a BAFTA Television Award (Best Editing, Fiction/Entertainment).

Having edited The Secret Garden (1987), fourteen years later Palmer was called on to work on the sequel Back to the Secret Garden (2001).

== Films ==
- Station Six-Sahara (1962), dubbing editor
- I Was Happy Here (1966), assistant film editor
- 30 Is a Dangerous Age, Cynthia (1967), sound mixer
- Shalako (1968), sound editor
- The Strange Affair (1968), dubbing editor
- Hello-Goodbye (1970), sound editor
- Wake in Fright (1971), sound editor
- I Start Counting (1970), film editor
- Nothing But the Night (1972), film editor
- And No One Could Save Her (1973), film editor
- Blue Blood (1973), film editor
- S*P*Y*S (1974), film editor
- I Don't Want to Be Born (1975), film editor
- Emily (1976), film editor
- Welcome to Blood City (1977), film editor
- The Uncanny (1977), film editor
- Charlie Muffin (1979), film editor
- Little Lord Fauntleroy (1980), film editor
- Rise and Fall of Idi Amin (1981), film editor
- The Hunchback of Notre Dame (1982), film editor
- Praying Mantis (1983), film editor
- The Lonely Lady (1983), film editor
- Sakharov (1984), film editor
- Wild Geese II (1985), film editor
- Bad Medicine (1985), film editor
- Murrow (1986), film editor
- Escape from Sobibor (1987), film editor
- The Secret Garden (1987), film editor
- Stones for Ibarra (1988), film editor
- Hands of a Murderer (1990), film editor
- Iran: Days of Crisis (1991), film editor
- The Winter Stallion, or The Christmas Stallion (1992), film editor
- The Lucona Affair (1993), film editor
- Hornblower: The Examination for Lieutenant (1998), film editor
- Hornblower: The Even Chance (1998), film editor
- Hornblower: The Duchess and the Devil (1999), film editor
- Oklahoma! (1999), film editor
- Back to the Secret Garden (2001), film editor
- Hornblower: Mutiny (2002), film editor
- Hornblower: Retribution (2002), film editor
- Hornblower: Loyalty (2003), film editor
- Hornblower: Duty (2003), film editor

== Television ==
- Strange Report (1969), film editor
- Shirley's World (1971), film editor
- Doomwatch (1972), film editor
- Quatermass (1979), film editor
- Hart to Hart, two episodes (1983, 1984), film editor
- Jack the Ripper, two episodes (1988), film editor
- Covington Cross, one episode (1992)
- Spender, Christmas Special - The French Collection (1993), film editor
- Scarlett, miniseries (1994), film editor
- Sharpe's Mission (1996), film editor
- Sharpe's Siege (1996), film editor
- Sharpe's Regiment (1996), film editor
- Sharpe's Waterloo (1997), film editor
- Sharpe's Justice (1997), film editor
- Sharpe's Revenge (1997), film editor
- Kavanagh QC, two episodes (1997), film editor
- Wire in the Blood, The Mermaids Singing (2002), film editor
- Wire in the Blood: Right to Silence and Still She Cries (2003), film editor
- Rose and Maloney, two episodes (2004), film editor
- Wire in the Blood: Nothing But the Night (2005), film editor
