= John E. Keane =

British film and television composer (born 1952)

- Born: 17 April 1952 (age 74); St Pancras, London, England
- Education: Guildhall School of Music and Drama; National Film and Television School
- Occupations: Film and television composer
- Years active: 1983–present
- Awards: BAFTA – Short Film – 1986; British Film Institute – Young Composer of the Year −1987

John E. Keane (born 17 April 1952) is a British BAFTA and BFI Award-winning film and television composer. He has been nominated for two British Academy of Film and Television Arts (BAFTA) awards, for A Very British Coup in 1989 and Hornblower: The Even Chance in 1999.

Keane's many credits include the 1993 miniseries Tales of the City, the 1998 film Hideous Kinky, and multiple installments of Hornblower between 1998 and 2003.

== Early years ==
Keane studied composition at the Guildhall School of Music and Drama with Edmund Rubbra, and piano with Geraldine Peppin. He went on to study sound recording and film music at the National Film and Television School. While there, he scored many graduation films, and his successful career as a composer was launched with his score for Careless Talk, which won the BAFTA Short Film Award in 1986. Keane quickly established himself in the film and television music industry in 1987, when he scored The Kitchen Toto, directed by Harry Hook. The film won the Tokyo Grand Prize, and Keane won a prize for Best Soundtrack at the Festival International du Film et de la Jeunesse. The same year, he won the 1987 British Film Institute prize for Young Composer of the Year.

== Film and TV ==
Keane's first television commission was for the serial A Very British Coup for director Mick Jackson. The show received many awards, including an International Emmy for Best Drama, five BAFTA Awards, a BAFTA nomination for Best Music, and Best Drama Series from the Broadcasting Press Guild. Since then, Keane has written music for a host of television dramas, including Selling Hitler, Tales from the City, A Pinch of Snuff, Faith, Hearts and Minds, Kavanagh QC, Plotlands, Far from the Madding Crowd, Pure Wickedness, Wives and Daughters, The Last of the Blonde Bombshells, Monsignor Renard, Anna Karenina, The Russian Bride, Gunpowder, Treason & Plot, Mansfield Park, the Emmy Award-winning Hornblower, and Heroes and Villains: "Shogun and Cortes".

Keane has also written music for a number of documentary series, including Molly Dineen's BBC The Ark, winner of a BAFTA Award, and The House, about London's Royal Opera House. He has also written music for a number of feature films, including four directed by Gilles McKinnon: Small Faces, Trojan Eddie, Hideous Kinky, and Tara Road.

His recent credits include the BBC crime drama series Case Histories and Inspector George Gently.

== Credits ==
=== Television ===
2014

- Inspector George Gently – Blue for Bluebird
- Inspector George Gently – Gently Between the Lines

2013

- Case Histories

2012

- Inspector George Gently – Gently in the Cathedral
- Inspector George Gently – The Lost Child

2008

- Sleep with Me
- Gently's Last Case

2007

- Mansfield Park
- Who Gets the Dog?
- Inspector George Gently – Gently Go Man

2006

- Perfect Day (The Funeral)

2005

- Wallis & Edward
- Uncle Adolf
- Tom Brown's Schooldays

2004

- Gunpowder, Treason & Plot
- The Brief
- Sparkling Cyanide
- A Line in the Sand

2002

- Bait
- Night Flight

2001

- The Russian Bride
- Hornblower (series 1,2,3)

2000

- Monsignor Renard (4 episodes)
- The Last of the Blonde Bombshells
- Anna Karenina

1999

- Kavanagh QC Series V
- Pure Wickedness
- Wives and Daughters (1 episode)

1998

- Far from the Madding Crowd
- Kavanagh QC Series IV

1997

- Plotlands (6-part serial)
- Stone Scissors Paper
- Kavanagh QC Series III

1996

- Kavanagh QC Series II

1995

- Killing Me Softly
- Mrs Hartley & the Growth Centre
- I'll Be Watching You

1994

- Faith
- A Pinch of Snuff

1993

- Circle of Deceit
- Tales of the City
- Maigret (2 episodes)
- Love and Reason (3 episodes)

1992

- Force of Duty
- The Last of His Tribe
- The Count of Solar
- The Hummingbird Tree

1991

- The Gravy Train Goes East
- Selling Hitler
- One Man's War

1990

- Murder East Murder West
- Stolen
- The Gravy Train

1988

- Defrosting the Fridge
- A Very British Coup
- Leaving

1985

- Careless Talk

=== Feature films ===
2005

- Tara Road

1998

- Hideous Kinky

1997

- A Further Gesture

1996

- Letters from the East
- Trojan Eddie
- Small Faces

1990

- Windprints

1989

- Chattahoochee
- Resurrected

1987

- The Kitchen Toto

1986

- Nanou

=== Documentaries ===
2008

- Heroes and Villains – Cortes
- Heroes and Villains – Shogun

2006

- Wolf

2003

- Out of the Ashes

2002

- Princess to Queen

2001

- The English Civil War

1996

- The House

1994

- True Brits: The Foreign Office

1993

- English Women's Garden
- The Ark

1991

- Billy – A Violent Mind

1989

- EastEnd GP's
- Landshapes

1986

- Movie Masterclass
