= Happy Now? (film) =

2001 film by Philippa Cousins

- Spanish DVD cover
- Directed by: Philippa Cousins
- Starring: Ioan Gruffudd; Paddy Considine
- Music by: Dario Marianelli
- Release date: 20 August 2001 (EIFF)
- Running time: 1h 37min
- Country: UK
- Language: English

Happy Now? is a 2001 British thriller film directed by Philippa Cousins.

== Cast ==
- Ioan Gruffudd - Max Bracchi
- Paddy Considine - Glen Marcus
- Susan Lynch - Tina Trent
- Emmy Rossum - Jenny Thomas / Nicky Trent
- Om Puri - Tin Man
- Richard Coyle - Joe Jones
- Robert Pugh - Hank Thomas
