= Ann Mollo =

British set decorator

Margaret Ann Mollo
- Born: Margaret Ann Farquharson; 1933 (age 92–93)
- Occupation: Set decorator
- Years active: 1973-1999
- Spouse: John Mollo (1956-1966; divorced)

Margaret Ann Mollo (née Farquharson) (born 1933) is a British set decorator, fashion model and garden designer. She was nominated for an Academy Award in the category Best Art Direction for the film The French Lieutenant's Woman.

== Selected filmography ==
- Theatre of Blood (1973)
- The French Lieutenant's Woman (1981)
- Greystroke (1984)
- Revolution (1985)
- Legend (1985)
