= Phoenix (1929 ship) =

Evangelical Mission schooner built in 1929

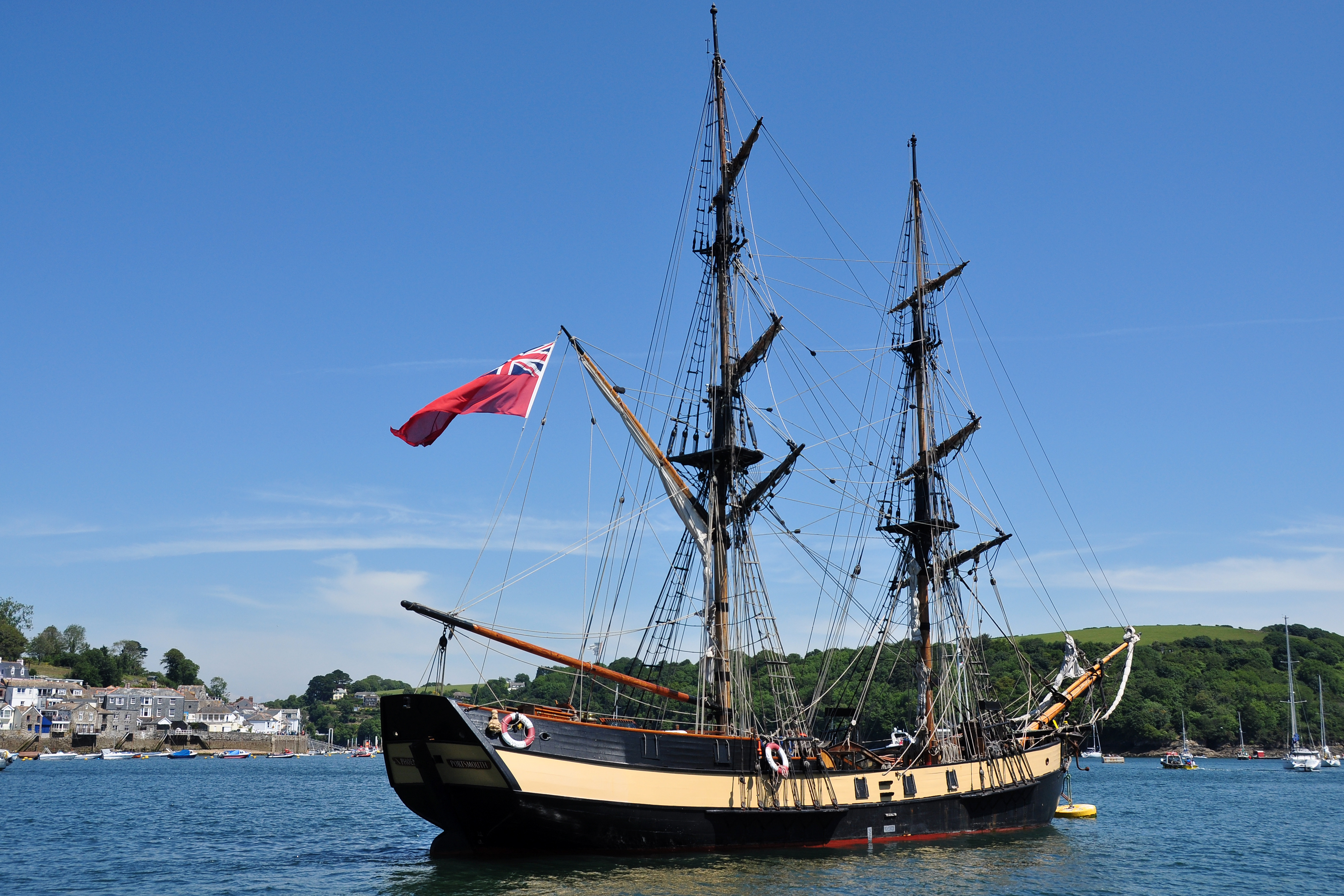
- Phoenix moored in the River Fowey, Cornwall

History

Denmark
- Name: Phoenix of Dell Quay
- Port of registry: Denmark
- Builder: Hjorne & Jakobsen at Frederikshavn, Denmark in 1929
- Acquired: Unknown owners, 1974
- Notes: Converted to brigantine

History

United Kingdom
- Owner: Square Sail Shipyards
- Port of registry: United Kingdom, Charlestown Harbour, Cornwall
- Acquired: 1988
- Renamed: Santa Maria, 1991
- Notes: 1991, converted to the 15th century Caravel Santa Maria; 1996, converted to 2 masted Brig, reverted to original name Phoenix of Dell Quay

General characteristics
- Class & type: Schooner, later brigantine
- Length: 112 ft. LOA
- Beam: 21.9 ft.
- Draught: 8.5 ft.
- Propulsion: 12 sails, 235 h.p. Volvo
- Complement: Crew of 10

The Phoenix is a ship built by Hjorne & Jakobsen at Frederikshavn, Denmark, in 1929, originally as an Evangelical Mission Schooner.

== Missionary and cargo ship ==
Twenty years after her construction, she was retired from missionary work and carried cargo until her engine room was damaged by fire.

In 1974 she was bought by new owners, John and Frederika Charles, from Holland. They had her rigged by Wayne Aldridge as a brigantine and registered as Irish. In 1976 she was chartered by Mariners International, a London based group of traditional sail enthusiasts. The group entered Phoenix in the 1976 Tall Ships Races, which involved two transatlantic crossings in four separate legs, and participation in the New York Parade of Sail on July 4^{th} to celebrate the US Bicentenary. Phoenix successfully completed all four races and enabled crews from many different countries to experience a deep sea voyage on a square rigger. She was the smallest vessel in Class A and the only one to be financed entirely by her crew. As such, she cut a somewhat eccentric figure amongst the mainly naval competitors in her class, lacking many modern comforts. She used paraffin lamps at night, navigation was by sextant and all food was either salted, tinned or dried, with chickens on deck to provide eggs most days. Her adventures are told in Jenni Atkinson’s book “A Girl in Square Rig” which was later published in paperback under the title “A Girl Before the Mast”.

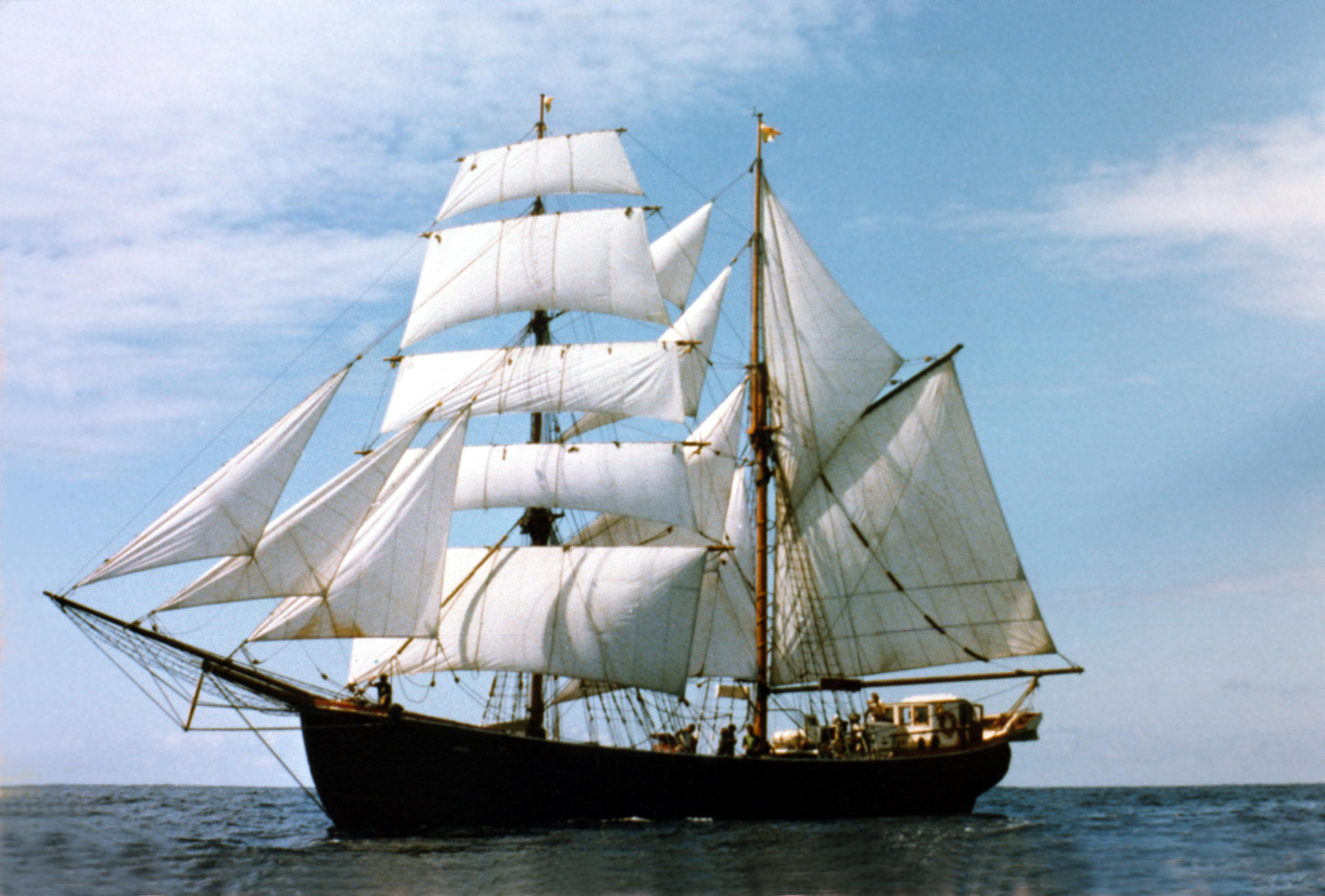
Phoenix in 1976

After her return to Holland, Phoenix undertook charter and sail training work until she deployed to the Caribbean.

In 1988, she was purchased by Square Sail. A first aid overhaul enabled her to sail back to the United Kingdom, where she underwent a complete refit.

== Conversion to Santa Maria ==
=== Caravel Santa Maria ===
In 1991 she was converted to the likeness of the 15th-century caravel Santa Maria for Ridley Scott's film 1492: Conquest of Paradise. She was known as Santa Maria until, in 1996, because of increasing demand for period square-riggers, she was converted into a two-masted brig and regained her original name, Phoenix of Dell Quay.

== Film credits ==
Film credits include:

- Hornblower Series III
- Voyage of Discovery
- Moll Flanders
- Frenchman's Creek
- The Scarlet Pimpernel
- Voyage of the Dawn Treader (BBC's Chronicles of Narnia TV Series)
- In the Heart of the Sea
- The Curse of the Black Spot
- Poldark
- Taboo - BBC's 2017 TV Series as "Good Hope"

== See also ==
- List of schooners
