= The Examination for Lieutenant =

- Written by: Mike Cullen
- Directed by: Andrew Grieve
- Starring: Ioan Gruffudd; Robert Lindsay; Ian McNeice; Denis Lawson
- Country of origin: United Kingdom
- Original language: English

Production
- Editor: Keith Palmer

Original release
- Network: ITV
- Release: 18 November 1998

Related
- The Even Chance; The Duchess and the Devil

The Examination for Lieutenant is an episode of the British television series Hornblower. It is loosely based on part of the 1950 novel Mr. Midshipman Hornblower by C. S. Forester. It was released on DVD in the United States as The Fire Ship and The Fire Ships.

== Plot ==
Sir Edward Pellew, captain of HMS Indefatigable decides to put his protégé, Horatio Hornblower, forward to be examined for promotion to lieutenant. Pellew cautions Hornblower to study diligently, because failure will mean an end to his acting lieutenant's grade and return to the midshipmen's ranks. Hornblower attempts to study, but constant challenges interrupt his reading and note taking.

Spain has made peace with France and is no longer an ally of Britain – Spanish ships, though technically neutral, begin to attack British ships. Wreckage from one supply ship is found by Indefatigable. Indefatigable recovers three survivors, among them Captain "Dreadnought" Foster, a famously heroic officer. Spain's actions have deprived the Gibraltar fleet of resupply, leaving Pellew no alternative but to order crews to half-rations. This action causes discontent among several sailors, especially Bunting, who begins to question whether the officers are facing the same deprivation. Hornblower reminds him that such talk can be considered mutinous and cautions him to stop.

A weakened Finch falls while climbing the ratlines, a victim of illness and the food shortage. With the crew attempting to keep the delirious Finch awake until he regains his senses, Hornblower asks Finch to quiz him from Hornblower's copy of the seamanship guide. Finch proves unable to concentrate, and succumbs to his illness and injuries. Despite being cautioned that his words could be considered mutinous, Bunting continues to rebel. Hornblower catches him stealing food, leading Pellew to order that Bunting be punished by being made to run the gauntlet. Because Hornblower admits he was not as firm as he should have been with Bunting earlier, Pellew orders Hornblower to lead Bunting as Bunting advances through the gauntlet; because Hornblower has to walk backwards and hold Bunting at sword point to prevent him from fleeing, Pellew's order means Hornblower is forced to watch every time Bunting is struck.

Mr. Tapling from the diplomatic service arrives, and he and Hornblower head ashore in Oran (part of Ottoman Algeria) to buy grain and cattle for the fleet. They soon discover that a plague has broken out. Anyone who went ashore must be quarantined for three weeks before being allowed to rejoin the fleet, so Hornblower is appointed captain of Caroline, a transport schooner carrying food and cattle, which is crewed by sailors who are also under quarantine. Hornblower catches Bunting trying to escape in the ship's longboat, and briefly imprisons him. Since he is short of crew, Hornblower offers Bunting an opportunity to prove his worth by rejoining the crew and capably performing his duties. Bunting accepts, and Hornblower releases him. Hornblower orders the crew to slaughter a bullock for dinner, reasoning that each meal might be their last, so they should enjoy it.

Bunting attempts to work with his crewmates, but the death of his friend Finch is too upsetting and he continues to grieve. When the crew goes ashore to procure water, they are attacked by Spanish soldiers. Bunting again attempts to escape and Hornblower catches him, but the distraught Bunting forces Hornblower to shoot and kill him. When Caroline encounters HMS Dreadnought, Captain Foster sends a boarding party to take a few sides of beef, despite Hornblower warning him the quarantine has not expired. At the end of the quarantine, no one appears ill, so they rejoin the fleet, where Hornblower receives a tongue in cheek rebuke from Pellew for the "wanton extravagance" of allowing his men to eat fresh beef.

At Gibraltar, Hornblower attempts his exam, a viva voce conducted by a group of senior officers including Foster. The examination begins badly but is interrupted when a Spanish fire ship sails into the anchorage. Hornblower and Foster volunteer to board it, and they succeed at steering it clear of the fleet. Because of his heroism, Hornblower is not demoted to midshipman but keeps his acting lieutenant's rank and receives permission to take the exam again at a future date.

== Cast ==
- Ioan Gruffudd as Acting Lieutenant Horatio Hornblower
- Robert Lindsay as Captain Sir Edward Pellew
- Ian McNeice as Mr. Tapling
- Denis Lawson as Captain "Dreadnought" Foster
- Paul Copley as Matthews
- Sean Gilder as Styles
- Andrew Tiernan as Bunting
- Jonathan Coy as Lieutenant Bracegirdle
- Ian McElhinney as Captain Hammond

== Related works ==
The events of this episode are drawn, with some alterations, from two chapters of Mr. Midshipman Hornblower. The section involving the cattle and the quarantine is from the chapter "Noah's Ark", and that of the exam and the fire ship is from the chapter "The Examination for Lieutenant". (The book also has a chapter in which Spain goes over to the French and Hornblower earns the rank of acting-lieutenant, but it is not used in this episode.) The subplot involving Bunting does not appear anywhere in the book.
