= Jonathan Coy =

British actor (born 1953)

- Born: 24 April 1953 (age 73); Hammersmith, London, England
- Occupation: Actor
- Years active: 1975–present
- Spouses: Louisa Rix (m. 1980–1990) Emma Amos (m. 1998)
- Children: 3, including Jolyon

Jonathan Coy (born 24 April 1953) is a British actor. He has worked since 1975 largely in television, notably as Henry in the long-running legal series Rumpole of the Bailey and as Bracegirdle in the television series Hornblower, adapted from the books by C. S. Forester. He also appeared as the German character, Kurt, in the British television drama Brideshead Revisited, in Episode 7, entitled "The Unseen Hook," and Colin Grove in The Sandbaggers in 1978.

In 2008, he played Lloyd in a UK tour of the play Noises Off, Leonato in the 2011 Wyndham's Theatre production of Much Ado About Nothing, with David Tennant, and Colonel Luykin in Pinero's The Magistrate at the Royal National Theatre in 2012-13, a production that was included in Season 4 of National Theatre Live.

In 1997, he appeared as Doug Arkwright in Hetty Wainthropp Investigates (“Daughter of the Regiment”, S3:E2). He also played a German spy called "Hans Maier" in the BBC Series Foyle's War, Series 2 Episode 1; and played the Prince of Wales in the BBC series The Scarlet Pimpernel (1999). In 2003, he played Henry VIII in The Six Mothers-in-law of Henry VIII, "an unreliable history," on BBC Radio 4.

He appeared in the 2001 critically acclaimed television film Conspiracy as Erich Neumann, the Director of the Office of the Four-Year Plan. His main scenes were with Brendan Coyle, who played Gestapo General Heinrich Muller. He would be reunited with Coyle over 10 years later on the set of Downton Abbey, where Coy played Mr George Murray, Lord Grantham's lawyer in a recurring role that spanned the entirety of the show's six season run. Coy portrayed George Murray again in the second film of the franchise's continuation in Downton Abbey: A New Era.

In 2014, he appeared in the world premiere production of Privacy at the Donmar Warehouse, London, and in 2015 in the world premiere production of Stoppard's The Hard Problem.

== Filmography ==
=== Film ===
Year	Film	Role	Notes	Ref.
1987	Maschenka	Alferov		
1989	The Wolves of Willoughby Chase	Lord Willoughby		
2001	Conspiracy	Erich Neumann		
2003	To Kill a King	Digby		
2003	Shoreditch	Karl		
2006	Alien Autopsy	Museum Director		
2009	Hell's Pavement	Charles Truman		
2011	Much Ado About Nothing	Leonato		
2013	The Magistrate	Colonel Lukyn	National Theatre Live broadcast	
2015	The Hard Problem	Leo	National Theatre Live broadcast	
2017	The Dying Hours	Ian	Short film	
2021	Living Proof	Uncle Mitch	Short film	
2022	Downton Abbey: A New Era	Murray		
2022	I Came By	Headmaster		

=== Television ===
Year	Film	Role	Notes	Ref.
1975	Crown Court	John Worsley	3 episodes	
1975–1978	Play for Today	Lotterby/James Firnley	2 episodes	
1976	Victorian Scandals	Harry Carstairs	Episode: "Skittles"	
1977	Coronation Street	Stanley Fairclough	2 episodes	
1977	Secret Army	Wright	Episode: "Child's Play"	
1978	The Sandbaggers	Colin Grove	Episode: "The Most Suitable Person"	
1978–1992	Rumpole of the Bailey	Henry	38 episodes	
1979	All Day on the Sands	Keith	Television film	
1981	Brideshead Revisited	Kurt	Episode: "The Unseen Hook"	
1984	Scarecrow and Mrs. King	Werner Mueller	Episode: "Our Man in Tegernsee"	
1984	The Life and Death of King John	Louis, the Dauphin	Television film	
1985	Jenny's War	Sgt. Mitchell	4 episodes	
1985	Silas Marner: The Weaver of Raveloe	Dunstan Cass	Television film	
1986	Gems	Mr. Crosby	2 episodes	
1987	Hello Mum	Unknown	Episode: "Episode #1.3"	
1987	A Killing on the Exchange	'Roots' Riety	Episode: "Episode #1.4"	
1987–1992	Boon	Mark Hardcastle/Mr. Marsden	2 episodes	
1988	Tales of the Unexpected	William Haddock	Episode: "The Surgeon"	
1988	The Return of Sherlock Holmes	Fitzroy Simpson	Episode: "Silver Blaze"	
1988–1990	Colin's Sandwich	Stuart	2 episodes	
1989	Young Charlie Chaplin	Hanwell Teacher	Episode: "Episode #1.3"	
1989	Poirot	Bunny Saunders	Episode: "The King of Clubs"	
1989	The Stone Age	Robert Irving	Television film	
1989	MuppeTelevision	Teacher	Episode: "Monster Maker"	
1989	Countdown to War	Butler	Television film	
1987–1990	Screen Two	Odilon/John Thorpe	2 episodes	
1990	Never Come Back	Marcus	3 episodes	
1990	KYTV	Man from Global Warming	Episode: "The Green Green Show"	
1990	Tygo Road	DC Ferris	Episode: "Episode #1.4"	
1990	TECX	Henry Seaton	Episode: "A Soldier's Death"	
1991	Chancer	Mr. Wastie	4 episodes	
1991	Casualty	Sally's Solicitor	Episode: "Judgement Day"	
1992	Screen One	Pym	Episode: "Adam Bede"	
1992	A Time to Dance	Dr. Geoffrey Greaves	Episode: "Episode #1.3"	
1992	The Darling Buds of May	Barry Mulcrone	2 episodes	
1992	Inspector Morse	Harry Balcombe	Episode: "Happy Families"	
1992	The Life and Times of Henry Pratt	Mr. Foden	Episode: "Episode #1.3"	
1992–1994	Lovejoy	Geoffrey Tibbs/Edward Carr	2 episodes	
1993	The Good Guys	Simon Scott	Episode: "All That Sparkles"	
1993	The Marshal	Stambrini	Television film	
1993	Between the Lines	Mike Collins	Episode: "The Fifth Estate"	
1994	Middlemarch	Naumann	2 episodes	
1994	The Rector's Wife	Peter Bouverie	4 episodes	
1994	Soldier Soldier	Tom Bridger	Episode: "Going Back"	
1994–2008	The Bill	Various	9 episodes	
1995	Moving Story	Edward Gant	Episode: "Trivial Pursuits"	
1995	Capital Lives	Marcus	Episode: "The Homecoming"	
1996	Rab C. Nesbitt	Adam Wheatfield	Episode: "Fuel"	
1996	Annie's Bar	Philip Salisbury	10 episodes	
1996	Bodyguards	Adrian Hellan	Episode: "Bodyguards"	
1996	Madson	George Lodge	3 episodes	
1996	Murder Most Horrid	Benjamin Trethansis	Episode: "Dying Live"	
1996	Drop the Dead Donkey	Trevor Hodge	Episode: "The Bird of Doom"	
1996	Cuts	Roger Trothammer	Television film	
1997	Gobble	Hans Gluk, German Food Minister	Television film	
1997	Original Sin	James de Witt	3 episodes	
1997	Holding On	Henri	Episode: "Episode #1.5"	
1997	Hetty Wainthropp Investigates	Doug Arkwright	Episode: "Daughter of the Regiment"	
1997	Underworld	Dennis	4 episodes	
1998	Game On	Nash	Episode: "Laura"	
1998	Mosley	Harold Nicolson	Episode: "Breaking the Mould"	
1998	Invasion: Earth	Maj. Alex Friedkin	Episode: "Only the Dead"	
1998	Hornblower: The Examination for Lieutenant	Lieutenant Bracegirdle	Television film	
1998–2004	Heartbeat	Gordon Price/Harry Horton	2 episodes	
1999	Hornblower: The Duchess and the Devil	Lieutenant Bracegirdle	Television film	
1999	A Touch of Frost	Ben Pecksmith	Episode: "Keys to the Car"	
1999	Hornblower: The Frogs and the Lobsters	Lieutenant Bracegirdle	Television film	
1999	Dangerfield	Marcus Baxter	Episode: "Something Personal"	
1999	Grafters	Richard	3 episodes	
1999	Trial by Fire	George Harmoner	Television film	
1999	Relative Strangers	Maj. Pinkerton	2 episodes	
1999–2000	The Scarlet Pimpernel	The Prince of Wales	4 episodes	
2000	Longitude	Adm. Sir Cloudsley Shovell	Television film	
2000	The Secret Adventures of Jules Verne	Sir Jonathan Chatsworth	11 episodes	
2001	The Life and Adventures of Nicholas Nickleby	Charles Cheeryble	Television film	
2001	Conspiracy	Erich Neumann	Television film	
2001	Always and Everyone	Henry Clark	Episode: "Episode #3.14"	
2001	Midsomer Murders	Kenneth Gooders	Episode: "Destroying Angel"	
2001–2005	Judge John Deed	David Stafford-Clark QC	3 episodes	
2002	The Falklands Play	Richard Luce MP	Television film	
2002	Harold Shipman: Doctor Death	DCS Bernard Postles	Television film	
2002	Ultimate Force	Griffin	Episode: "Breakout"	
2002	Holby City	Dr. Caterall	Episode: "Leopard Spots"	
2003	Hornblower: Duty	Captain Bracegirdle	Television film	
2003	The Lost Prince	Dr. Hetherington	Television film	
2003	Down to Earth	Dennis Gould	Episode: "High Hopes"	
2003	The Eustace Bros.	George Topley	Episode: "Episode #1.5"	
2003	Death in Holy Orders	Clive Stannard	2 episodes	
2003	Foyle's War	Hans Maier	Episode: "Fifty Ships"	
2003	Blue Dove	Hannes	TV mini series	
2003–2004	My Dad's the Prime Minister	Dave Clackson	2 episodes	
2005	M.I.T.: Murder Investigation Team	Gerrard Anderson	Episode: "Episode #2.2"	
2005	Rome	Actor for Cato	Episode: "Utica"	
2005	Doc Martin	Mr. Sands	Episode: "In Loco"	
2005	The Slavery Business	John Ashley	Episode: "How to Make a Million from Slavery"	
2006	Ancient Rome: The Rise and Fall of an Empire	Florius	Episode: "Rebellion"	
2007	The Last Detective	Ronald Coutler	Episode: "Dangerous Liaisons"	
2007	My Family	Prosecutor	Episode: "Life Begins at Fifty"	
2007	The Old Curiosity Shop	Rev. Pratchett	Television film	
2007	Starting Over	Mr. David Sharp	Television film	
2010	Reunited	Gerald	Television film	
2010	Pete versus Life	Duncan	Episode: "Older Woman"	
2010	The Pillars of the Earth	Father Ralph	8 episodes	
2010	Ladies of Letters	Vincent	7 episodes	
2010–2014	Downton Abbey	George Murray	7 episodes	
2011	Comedy Showcase	Father of Fanny	Episode: "Felix and Murdo"	
2012	Parents	Man at Auction	Episode: "Episode #1.5"	
2012	Parade's End	Bertram	3 episodes	
2014	Endeavour	Archie Batten	Episode: "Trove"	
2015	Suspects	Mike Wilson	Episode: "Victim"	
2018	Collateral	Bishop Rufus Chambers	Episode: "Episode #1.3"	
2018	Still Open All Hours	Mr. Machin	Episode: "Episode #5.2"	
2020	Des	Professor David Bowen	2 episodes	
2022	Anatomy of a Scandal	Judge Aled Luckhurst	5 episodes	
2023	Great Expectations	Judge Mansell	2 episodes	
