= On the Black Hill (film) =

1987 film by Andrew Grieve

- Directed by: Andrew Grieve
- Produced by: Jennifer Howarth
- Starring: Bob Peck; Gemma Jones
- Cinematography: Thaddeus O'Sullivan
- Edited by: Scott Thomas
- Release date: 1987
- Running time: 117 minutes
- Country: United Kingdom
- Language: English
- Budget: £639,000

On the Black Hill is a 1987 film directed by Andrew Grieve, based upon the novel of the same name by Bruce Chatwin.

Although Bruce Chatwin initially considered his novel about 80 years of rural family life in the Welsh border country unfilmable, he changed his mind when he saw how keen director Andrew Grieve was to make it and they went together to see some of the places and meet some of the people that Chatwin had been inspired by. Chatwin told Grieve to use the book for his film and make it his own.

== Plot ==
On the Black Hill begins in the closing years of the 19th century with the marriage of dour, puritanical Welsh farmer Amos Jones to his social superior, vicar’s daughter Mary Latimer after the death of her father. Her inheritance and social connections enable them to rent a vacant farm, 'The Vision', a situation that is a cause for resentment in their relationship. It is against this background, along with a boundary feud with Watkins, a malicious neighbour, that the twins Lewis and Benjamin grow up. Having come through wars, romance and separation, they are still farming at 'The Vision' eighty years later.

== Cast ==
- Bob Peck as Amos Jones
- Gemma Jones as Mary Jones (née Latimer)
- Mike Gwilym as Benjamin Jones
- Robert Gwilym as Lewis Jones
- Nicola Beddoe as Rosie
- Patrick Godfrey as The Auctioneer
- Catherine Schell as Lotte Zons
- Benjamin Whitrow as Arkwright
- Eric Wyn as Tom Watkins

== Production ==
Bob Peck as the gaunt, wild-eyed Amos Jones dominates the early scenes, though he is well matched by Gemma Jones as his wife Mary. With typical thoroughness, Peck immersed himself in the part, learning to ride, plough and pleach hedges.

Although the film was made on a tight budget, the director had time to scout out appropriate locations in the area. "We spent far longer researching the locations than we would normally and it was the quality of the landscape and the discovery of the perfect farmhouse at Llanfihangel Nant Brân near Sennybridge which was critical to its success," said Grieve at a screening of the film at Borderlines Film Festival in 2006.

In fact, locations throughout the Welsh borders were used for the film, notably The Black Mountains, Hay-on-Wye and Crickhowell. Props and furniture for the film were borrowed from people and houses in the area and even the local WI was used to knit garments appropriate to the period. All of this firmly locates the film in its region and, as Grieve says, gives it a strong sense of reality. Grieve was brought up in mid Wales and so his understanding of the region and its people was crucial to the film’s atmosphere. The cinematography, by Thaddeus O'Sullivan, has been widely acclaimed.
