= Ioan Gruffudd =

Welsh actor (born 1973)

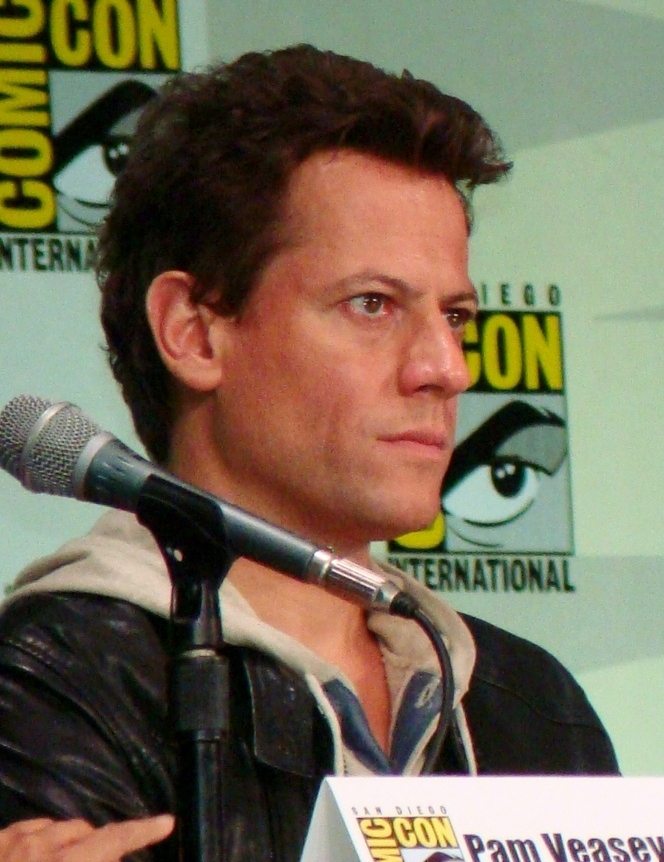
- Gruffudd at the 2011 San Diego Comic-Con
- Born: 6 October 1973 (age 53); Aberdare, Wales
- Citizenship: United Kingdom; United States
- Education: Royal Academy of Dramatic Art
- Occupation: Actor
- Years active: 1986–present
- Spouse: Alice Evans (m. 2007; div. 2023) Bianca Wallace (m. 2025)
- Children: 3

Ioan Gruffudd (Welsh: [ˈjoan ˈɡrɪfɪð]; /ˈjoʊɑːn ˈɡrɪfɪθ/; born 6 October 1973) is a Welsh actor. He is known for his roles in film and television series in the United Kingdom, the United States, and Australia.

Gruffudd became known for his portrayal of Harold Lowe in Titanic (1997), and as Horatio Hornblower in the Hornblower series of television films (1998–2003). His subsequent roles have included Lancelot in King Arthur (2004), Reed Richards / Mister Fantastic in Fantastic Four (2005) and its 2007 sequel Fantastic Four: Rise of the Silver Surfer, William Wilberforce in Amazing Grace (2006), Tony Blair in W. (2008), and Adam Lockwood in Bad Boys: Ride or Die (2024).

== Early life and education ==
Gruffudd was born on 6 October 1973 in Aberdare, the eldest of three siblings. His parents, Gillian (née James) and Peter Griffiths (Ioan uses Gruffudd, the more traditional Welsh version of the surname), were both teachers.

His father was headmaster at two Welsh-language comprehensive schools in South Wales, first at Ysgol Gyfun Llanhari (in Llanharry, Rhondda Cynon Taf) then later at Ysgol Gyfun Rhydfelen (in Rhydfelin). Gruffudd was raised in a Nonconformist household.

During his childhood, his family moved to Cardiff. Gruffudd attended three Welsh-medium schools: Ysgol Gynradd Gymraeg Aberdar (Ynyslwyd; now located in Cwmdare), Ysgol Gymraeg Melin Gruffydd (in Whitchurch, Cardiff), and Ysgol Gyfun Gymraeg Glantaf (in Llandaff North).

He was an accomplished oboist in his teens, achieving a Grade 8 level in the ABRSM music examinations and playing in the South Glamorgan Youth Orchestra for several years, but gave it up once acting took up most of his time. He won prizes for his high baritone singing while at school, including one at the National Eisteddfod. He has said, "As a Welshman, I grew up in a culture of singing and performing with music, and I think it was through this performing that I got my confidence as an actor."

Gruffudd's parents are committed Christians, and in his early 20s he was a member of the London Church of Christ, but his mother later came to London to "sort [his] head out".

== Career ==
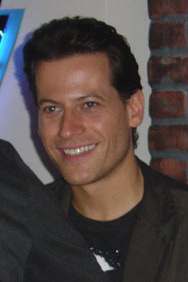
Gruffudd in 2005

Gruffudd's acting career began at the age of 13 with the Welsh television film, Austin (1986), followed by appearing in the Welsh language soap opera Pobol y Cwm (People of the Valley) from 1987 to 1994. He also played football with the Pobol y Cwm football team Cwmderi FC alongside co-stars Hywel Emrys, Gwyn Elfyn, and Ieuan Rhys. During this time, he was also active on stage, in school performances, and in the 1991 Urdd Eisteddfod production of Cwlwm.

In 1992, aged 18, he began attending the Royal Academy of Dramatic Art (RADA) in London. However, he was only given small parts in the academy's productions, and feeling isolated and directionless, almost dropped out several times. But in 1995, while in his final year, he was cast in Ibsen's Hedda Gabler as George (Jørgen) Tesman, the husband of Hedda, the lead character. This performance led to his being offered the role of Jeremy Poldark in the 1996 TV remake of Poldark.

After playing Oscar Wilde's lover John Gray in 1997's Wilde he took a role as Fifth Officer Harold Lowe in James Cameron's film Titanic. He later landed the role of Horatio Hornblower in Hornblower, the Meridian production of the C. S. Forester novels (1998–2003), shown on ITV and A&E. He has said: "It was quite something for an unknown actor to get the lead. So I will always be grateful to Hornblower. ... I would love to play this character through every stage of his life. I think it would be unique to have an actor playing him from the very early days as a midshipman, through till he's an Admiral. So, I would love to play this character till he perishes."

His television work includes playing the character Pip in the BBC TV production of Charles Dickens' Great Expectations (1999), Lt. John Feeley in BBC One's Warriors (1999) and architect Philip Bosinney in ITV's adaptation of The Forsyte Saga (2002). He has starred in the films 102 Dalmatians (2000), Black Hawk Down (2001) and King Arthur (2004).

Gruffudd, a native Welsh speaker, was inducted into the Gorsedd Beirdd Ynys Prydain (the Bardic Order of Great Britain) at the highest rank of Druid in the National Eisteddfod at Meifod, mid-Wales, on 4 August 2003, with the bardic name "Ioan".

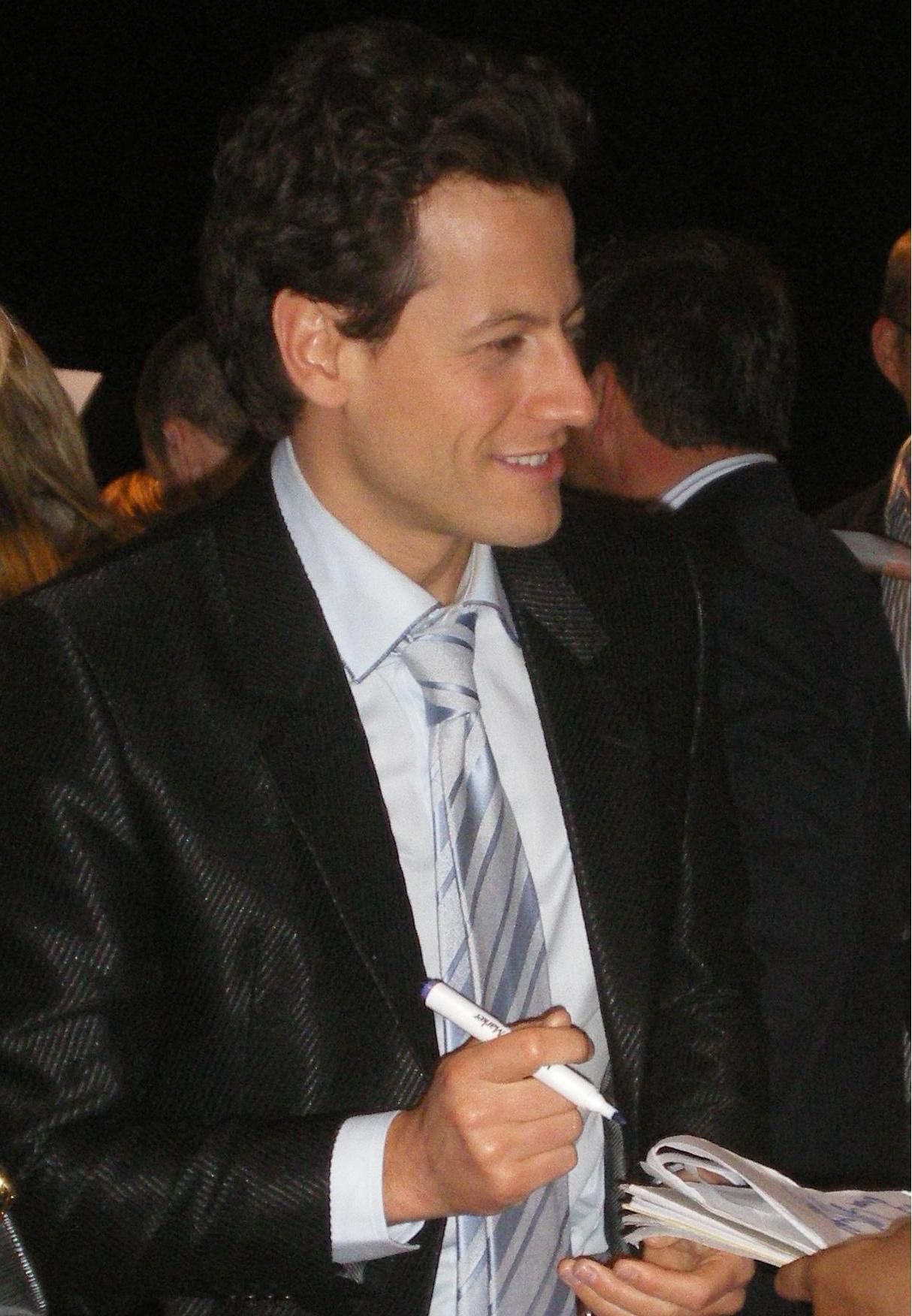
Gruffudd in 2007

In 2007, he starred in the historical drama Amazing Grace as William Wilberforce, the British abolitionist, receiving critical acclaim for the role. Gruffudd has also portrayed characters of both Marvel Comics and DC Comics, having appeared as Reed Richards / Mister Fantastic in Marvel's Fantastic Four (2005) and Fantastic Four: Rise of the Silver Surfer (2007), and guest starred as the voice of Mister Miracle in DC's Justice League Unlimited (2005).

In 2008, he appeared in the Julia Roberts-Ryan Reynolds film, Fireflies in the Garden. In 2008, he also appeared in The Secret of Moonacre. In 2009, he starred alongside Josh Brolin in W., a biopic about the life of US President George W Bush, in which Gruffudd played Tony Blair. In 2011, he played the financier of a cave dive in Sanctum.

In July 2008, he featured in a promotional trailer in Welsh for BBC Wales, alongside fellow Welshmen Matthew Rhys and Gethin Jones, publicising BBC coverage of the 2008 National Eisteddfod of Wales in Cardiff. In early 2014, Gruffudd was among the stars of Wales in a short film from the BBC to mark the centenary of the birth of Welsh poet Dylan Thomas.

Gruffudd débuted his new male lead of Andrew Earlham, a respected surgeon and widowed father of a teenage son, on 11 September 2017, in ITV's new 6-part thriller miniseries, Liar. Earlham's world—personally and professionally—is torn asunder when his son's schoolteacher, Laura Neilson (Joanne Froggatt) accuses him of raping her after their first date, the details of which she cannot remember. Liar also began airing in the US on SundanceTV on 25 September 2017.

In 2018, Gruffudd was cast as forensic pathologist Dr. Daniel Harrow in the Australian TV show Harrow airing on the ABC. The show is set and filmed in Brisbane and focuses on Gruffudd's character Harrow - a forensic pathologist with a total disregard for authority, and an unfailing empathy for the dead which helps him to solve bizarre cases. The series was a ratings hit in Australia and overseas, the show ran for three seasons, ending in 2021. Also in 2018, Gruffudd starred in A Shakespeare Jubilee! directed by Louis Fantasia at The Wallis in Beverly Hills.

Apart from television and film work, he starred in the music video of Westlife's version of "Uptown Girl" (2001) alongside Claudia Schiffer. On 7 July 2007 he was a presenter at the UK leg of Live Earth at Wembley Stadium, London.

His other film credits include The Gathering (2003), Fireflies in the Garden (2008), The Secret of Moonacre (2008), Sanctum, Horrible Bosses, Foster (all 2011), The Adventurer: The Curse of the Midas Box (2014), and San Andreas (2015).

On television, Gruffudd has starred in the CW series Ringer (2011–2012), the ABC drama Forever (2014–2015), the Lifetime series UnREAL (2016), Sundance/ITV's Liar (2017–2020). On radio, he recently voiced the role of John Adams in BBC Radio 4's two-part adaptation of the musical 1776.

== Personal life ==
Gruffudd met Alice Evans in 1999 during the production of 102 Dalmatians. They moved to Los Angeles together in 2003. On 14 September 2007, they married in Mexico. His best man was fellow Welsh actor Matthew Rhys, a long-time friend. Both are patrons of Trust PA, a UK spinal injuries charity. Evans and Gruffudd have two daughters, born in 2009 and 2013.

In an interview in 2020, Gruffudd said that working away from home meant that he and his wife had struggled to spend time with each other in the previous four years. Evans announced the couple's separation in January 2021. On 1 March 2021, Gruffudd filed for divorce. On 14 February 2022, Gruffudd filed for a domestic violence restraining order against Evans. This included protection of his girlfriend Bianca Wallace. On 2 August 2022, Gruffudd was granted a three-year permanent domestic violence restraining order against Evans. Their divorce was finalized and they were declared legally divorced in July of 2023. In February 2026, the Restraining Order was renewed for 5 years, due to Alice's ongoing violations.

In 2024, Gruffudd confirmed that he was engaged to Bianca Wallace. The couple had confirmed their relationship in 2021. They married in April 2025., the couple have a daughter born in the same year.

== Filmography ==
=== Film ===
Year	Title	Role	Notes
1997	Wilde	John Gray	
1997	Titanic	Harold Lowe	
1999	Solomon & Gaenor	Solomon Levinsky	
1999	The Miracle Maker	Jesus Christ (voice)	Welsh dub
2000	102 Dalmatians	Kevin Shepherd	
2001	Another Life	Freddy Bywaters	
2001	Very Annie Mary	Hob	
2001	Happy Now?	Sgt. Max Bracchi	
2001	Black Hawk Down	Lt. John Beales	
2002	Shooters	Freddy Guns	
2002	The Gathering The Forsyte Saga	Dan Blakeley Philip Bosinney	
2003	This Girl's Life	Daniel	
2004	King Arthur	Lancelot	
2005	Fantastic Four	Reed Richards / Mister Fantastic	Nominated—MTV Movie Award for Best On-Screen Team (with Jessica Alba, Chris Evans and Michael Chiklis)
2006	The TV Set	Richard McAllister	
2006	Amazing Grace	William Wilberforce	
2007	Fantastic Four: Rise of the Silver Surfer	Reed Richards / Mister Fantastic	Nominated—Teen Choice Award for Choice Movie Dance; Nominated—Razzie Award for Worst Screen Couple (with Jessica Alba)
2007	Stories USA	Simon	
2008	Fireflies in the Garden	Addison	
2008	The Secret of Moonacre	Sir Benjamin Merryweather	
2008	W.	Tony Blair	
2008	Agent Crush	Agent Crush (voice)	
2010	The Kid	Teacher	
2011	Horrible Bosses	Wetwork Expert	Cameo
2011	Sanctum	Carl Hurley	
2011	Foster	Alec	Also titled Angel in the House
2013	The Adventurer: The Curse of the Midas Box	Charles Mundi	
2013	Eddie	The Killer	Short
2014	Justice League: War	Thomas Morrow (voice)	Direct-to-video
2014	Playing It Cool	Stuffy	
2015	Under Milk Wood	Mog Edwards	
2015	San Andreas	Daniel Riddick	
2017	Keep Watching	Adam Miller	
2018	Buttons	William Kingsley	
2019	The Professor and the Madman	Henry Bradley	
2020	Ava	Peter	
2024	Bad Boys: Ride or Die	Adam Lockwood	
2026	Seven Snipers	Milk	
2026	Drummer Boy	Nathaniel Clem	

=== Video games ===
Year	Title	Role	Notes
2005	Fantastic Four	Reed Richards / Mister Fantastic	Based on the film of the same name
2012	Diablo III	Necromancer (male)	

=== Television ===
Year	Title	Role	Notes
1986	Austin	Dafydd	
1987–1994	Pobol y Cwm	Gareth Wyn Harries	
1996	Poldark	Jeremy Poldark	
1998	Hornblower: The Even Chance	Midshipman Horatio Hornblower	
1998	Hornblower: The Examination for Lieutenant	Acting Lt. Horatio Hornblower	
1999	Warriors	Lt. John Feeley	
1999	Hornblower: The Duchess and the Devil	Acting Lt. Horatio Hornblower	
1999	Hornblower: The Frogs and the Lobsters	Lt. Horatio Hornblower	
1999	Great Expectations	Pip	
2002	Hornblower: Mutiny	3rd Lt. Horatio Hornblower	
2002	Hornblower: Retribution	3rd Lt. Horatio Hornblower	
2002	Man and Boy	Harry Silver	
2002	The Forsyte Saga	Phillip Bosinney	
2003	Hornblower: Loyalty	Commander Horatio Hornblower	
2003	Hornblower: Duty	Commander Horatio Hornblower	
2004	Century City	Lukas Gold	
2005	Justice League Unlimited	Mister Miracle (voice)	Episode: "The Ties That Bind"
2008	The Meant to Be's	The Man	
2010	Ben 10: Alien Force	Devin Levin (voice)	Episode: "Vendetta"
2010	Batman: The Brave and the Bold	Blue Beetle Scarab (voice)	Episode: "Revenge of the Reach!"
2011–2012	Ringer	Andrew Martin	
2012	Family Guy	Prince Charles (voice)	Episode: "Family Guy Viewer Mail #2"
2012	The British	Narrator	
2013	Monday Mornings	Dr. Stewart Delaney	Guest role
2013	Castle	Erik Vaughn	Episode: "The Squab and the Quail"
2013	Necessary Roughness	Nolan Powers	Guest role
2013	Glee	Paolo San Pablo	2 episodes
2014–2015	Forever	Dr. Henry Morgan	Lead, 22 episodes
2016	UnReal	John Booth	Guest role
2017–2020	Liar	Andrew Earlham	Lead, 12 episodes
2018–2021	Harrow	Dr. Daniel Harrow	Lead role
2022	The Reunion	Thomas Degalais	Lead role
2025	Elsbeth	Angus Oliphant-Donnachaidh	Episode: "Tiny Town"

=== Theatre ===
Year	Title	Location	Role
1995	Hedda Gabler	London (RADA)	George (Jörgen) Tesman
1995	Trouble Sleeping	National Theatre Studio, London	Unknown
1995	The Decameron	Gate Theatre, Notting Hill, London	Unknown
2001	The Play What I Wrote	Wyndham's Theatre, London	Mystery Guest

=== Music video ===
Year	Title	Performer	Album	Ref.
2001	"Uptown Girl"	Westlife	World of Our Own	

== Bibliography ==
- Hoggard, Liz (2 July 2005). "Ioan Gruffudd: Enter the dragon". The Independent. London, UK. Archived from the original on 6 May 2008.
- "Ioan Gruffudd biography". BBC Wales.
