= Paul Copley =

British actor (born 1944)

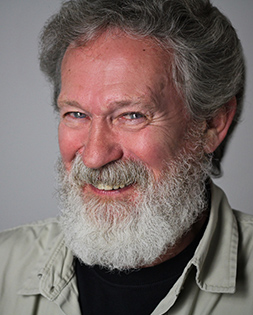
- Copley in 2012
- Born: Paul Mackriell Copley; 25 November 1944 (age 81); Denby Dale, West Riding of Yorkshire, England
- Occupation: Actor
- Years active: 1972–present
- Spouse: Natasha Pyne (m. 1972)
- Website: http://www.paulcopley.actor

Paul Mackriell Copley (born 25 November 1944) is an English actor. From 2011 to 2015 he appeared as Mr. Mason, father of William Mason, in 16 episodes of Downton Abbey, and from 2020 to 2021, he appeared in the ITV soap opera Coronation Street as Arthur Medwin.

== Early life ==
Copley was born in Denby Dale, West Riding of Yorkshire, and grew up beside a dairy farm there. His father, Harold, was involved with local amateur dramatic productions, as were the rest of his family. He went to Penistone Grammar School, then to the Northern Counties College of Education in Newcastle upon Tyne, where he received an Associate of the Drama Board (ADB) in Drama. He taught English and Drama in Walthamstow, before he joined the Leeds Playhouse Theatre-in-education Company in 1971.

== Career ==
Copley was the male lead character in the four-part BBC series Days of Hope in 1975, which depicted events between the First World War and the General Strike from a family involved in socialist politics.

In 1976, Copley won the Laurence Olivier Award for Actor of the Year in a New Play for his role in John Wilson's For King and Country.

After appearing as Private Wicks in the film A Bridge Too Far (1977), he played a small but noticeable role as Cpl Storey of the British Army in Zulu Dawn (1979). He appeared in the then-controversial ATV drama Death of a Princess (1980), playing a British witness to the killing of an Arabian princess and her lover. He has played Matthews in Hornblower, Ian in Roughnecks, Jerry in This Life, and Peter Quinlan in The Lakes. He played Nathan Maloney's father in the critically acclaimed Queer as Folk. He was in Big Finish's July 2002 Doctor Who, story Spare Parts and appeared in Shameless as a water sports enthusiast. In 1980, he appeared in the highly successful comedy drama series Minder, playing George Palmer in episode The Old School Tie. He narrated the Channel 4 programme How Clean Is Your House?, and featured in the ITV children's hit show Best Friends in 2005–2006, playing the grandfather.

He is a regular actor in Radio 4 drama, usually in gritty or romantic plays or series about hard-working folk set in the north of England, often repeated on BBC Radio 4 Extra. Whenever a genial Yorkshire accent has been cast in the BBC radio drama department, he has often been summoned. Copley played the long-suffering teacher Geoff Long in Radio 4's long running King Street Junior. Covering ten series and some seventy-six episodes, this ran on BBC Radio 4 from 1985 to 1998. He also narrated the Yorkshire Television nine-part serial adaptation of The Pilgrim's Progress (1985) entitled Dangerous Journey.

On 13 February 2006, Copley appeared as an angry hostage-taker in an episode of the crime drama Life on Mars. Copley appeared in the TV Soap Coronation Street on 8 August 2007, portraying a character called Ivor Priestley, and as wizard and former-frog Algernon Rowan-Webb in Jill Murphy's TV adaptation of The Worst Witch.

From 1998 to 2003, Copley played Mathews in the Meridian Television series Hornblower. He appeared as Clement MacDonald in Children of Earth, the third series of BBC One show Torchwood, in 2009. The following year, he was seen in episodes of BBC One shows Casualty and Survivors. From 2011 to 2015 he appeared as Mr. Mason, father of William Mason, in 16 episodes of Downton Abbey; in 2012, he played Alan in the television series White Heat.

Between 2012 and 2020 he played Harry in 5 seasons of the TV series Last Tango in Halifax. In 2014 he played the part of Malcolm Kenrich in the episode "On Harbour Street" of the TV series Vera.

In 2014 he narrated the Channel 5 programme The Railway – First Great Western of which there are 12 episodes. He also features as the father in Tom Wrigglesworth's Hang-Ups, a comedy on BBC Radio 4.

In 2016, he appeared in episode 2.4 "The Beast of Lighthaven" as John Roxwell in the BBC series The Coroner.

In 2017, Copley appeared in Jimmy McGovern's acclaimed series Broken, Red Production Company's Trust Me, and played the eccentric Walter O'Donnell in episode 5 of Doc Martin. He also took part in What Does an Idea Sound Like promoting the Veterans Work Campaign and narrated A Celebrity Taste of Italy for Channel 5.

In 2018, he played the role of Charlie Rainbird in the short film Thousand Yesterdays, currently in post production, and continues to voice Morrisons advertisements on radio and television in the UK. Additionally in 2018, Copley played Charity Dingle's father Obadiah in Emmerdale.

On 7 February 2019, he made his first appearance as Leonard (Jill Archer's new love interest) in the BBC radio 4 soap opera The Archers.

On 9 January 2020 he appeared as Feste in Father Brown on BBC1.

== Personal life ==
He married actress Natasha Pyne in 1972, after performing with her in a Leeds Playhouse production of Frank Wedekind's Lulu, adapted by Peter Barnes and directed by Bill Hays in 1971.

== Filmography ==
Year	Title	Role	Notes
1972–2021	Coronation Street	Photographer/Ivor Priestley/Arthur Medwin	
1975	Alfie Darling	Bakey	
1977	A Bridge Too Far	Private Wicks	Film
1977	Treasure Island	Ben Gunn	
1977	Secret Army	Finch	
1978	Strangers	Des White	
1979	Zulu Dawn	Cpl. Storey	
1980	Jackanory	Storyteller	
1982	Doll's Eye	Social Worker	
1988	Gruey	Mr Grucock	
1988	War and Remembrance	Dagget	
1989	Gruey Twoey	Mr Grucock	
1989–1991	Grange Hill	St Joseph's Caretaker/Duncan Yeats	
1990–2010	The Bill	Various Roles	
1991	How's Business	Jack	
1992	Heartbeat	Dick Radcliffe	
1993	The Remains of the Day	Harry Smith	Film
1994	Dalziel and Pascoe: "A Pinch of Snuff"		
1995	Casualty	Frederick Chambers/Mick McCarthur/Arthur Dixon	
1996	Jude	Mr. Willis	
1996	This Life	Jerry	
1997	The Lakes	Peter Quinlan	
1998	Hornblower: The Even Chance	Matthews	
1998	Hornblower: The Examination for Lieutenant	Matthews	
1999	Hornblower: The Duchess and the Devil	Matthews	
1999	Hornblower: The Frogs and the Lobsters	Matthews	
1999	The Worst Witch	Algernon Rowan-Webb	
1999–2019	Holby City	Jeff Jones/ Ross Saunders/Roger Keelan	
2001	Blow Dry	Ken	
2002	Hornblower: Mutiny	Matthews	
2002	Hornblower: Retribution	Matthews	
2002	Dalziel and Pascoe	Jack Henslowe	
2003	Hornblower: Loyalty	Matthews	
2003	Hornblower: Duty	Matthews	
2006	Johnny and the Bomb	Sgt Bourke	
2006	Life on Mars	Angry Hostage-Taker Reg Cole	
2004	Heartbeat	Herbie Lloyd	
2006	Heartbeat	Herbie Lloyd	
2007–2018	Doctors	Various roles	
2009	Torchwood: Children of Earth	Clement McDonald	
2011-2015	Downton Abbey	Mr. Mason	
2012–2020	Last Tango in Halifax	Harry	
2014	Midsomer Murders	Frank Dewar	
2014	Vera	Malcolm Kenrich	
2015	Inside No. 9: "The 12 Days of Christine"	Ernie	
2017	Doc Martin	Walter O'Donnell	
2018	Emmerdale	Obadiah Dingle	
2020	Father Brown	Feste	
2021	Doctors	Ernie Lynn	
2022	Downton Abbey: A New Era	Albert Mason	Film
2025	Downton Abbey: The Grand Finale	Albert Mason	Film
2025	Play for Today	Arthur	

== Radio ==
Year	Title	Role	Notes
2019–	The Archers	Leonard Berry	BBC Radio 4
2013–2019	Tom Wrigglesworth's Hang Ups	Dad	
2002–2005	King Street Junior Revisited	Mr. Long	BBC Radio 4
1985–1998	King Street Junior	Mr. Long	Also credited as Writer 1995-1998
1991	The Railway Children	Perks	BBC Radio 5
