= Heroes and Villains (TV series) =

- BBC DVD cover
- Genre: Drama
- Written by: Clare Saxby; Tony Etchells; Nick Murphy; James Wood; Andrew Grieve; Lyall B. Watson; Colin Heber-Percy
- Directed by: Nick Murphy; Tim Dunn; Nick Green; Andrew Grieve; Gareth Edwards; Arif Nurmohamed
- Starring: James Saito; Rory McCann; Brian McCardie Daragh O'Malley; Tom Burke; Anthony Flanagan; Steven Waddington
- Country of origin: United Kingdom
- Original language: English
- No. of series: 1
- No. of episodes: 6

Production
- Executive producer: Matthew Barrett
- Producer: Mark Hedgecoe
- Running time: 60 minutes

Original release
- Network: BBC One
- Release: 11 November 2007 – 29 March 2008

Related
- Ancient Rome: The Rise and Fall of an Empire

Heroes and Villains is a 2007 BBC Television six-part docudrama series looking at key moments in the lives and reputations of some of the greatest warriors of history. Each hour-long episode features a different historical figure, including Napoleon I of France, Attila the Hun, Spartacus, Hernán Cortés, Richard I of England, and Tokugawa Ieyasu. The statements at the beginning of each episode read: "This film depicts real events and real characters. It is based on the accounts of writers of the time. It has been written with the advice of modern historians." In the United States the show was aired on The Military Channel and was called Warriors.

== Production ==
The series was filmed by BBC Factual department in 720p high definition with the Panasonic DVCPRO HD cameras. The greenscreen scenes were filmed with handheld AG-HVX200 cameras.

== Episodes ==
The numbering of the six episodes that make up the series is debatable due to them being listed differently on different sources. The DVD release has them listed in the order of Spartacus, Attila the Hun, Shogun, Richard the Lionheart, Cortes, and Napoleon; while the BBC website guide has them listed as Napoleon 1/6, Cortes 2/6, Attila the Hun 3/6, Shogun 4/6, Spartacus 5/6, and Richard the Lionheart 6/6. However they are listed here by their airdate according to the BBC website.

No.	Title	Directed by	Written by	Historical Consultant	Original release date
1	"Napoleon"	Nick Murphy	Nick Murphy	Professor Alan Forrest, University of York	11 November 2007
Filmed on location in Malta, this story covers the siege of Toulon. Beginning in Marseilles on 24 August 1793 and ending on 18 December 1793, it covers his rivalry with Fréron as well as his sister Paoletta's affair with Fréron and his rise through the ranks as they fight the English at "Little Gibraltar." Cast: Rob Brydon as Fréron; Richard McCabe as Barras; Tom Burke as Napoleon; Laura Greenwood as Paoletta; Alice Krige as Letizia; Alex Lowe as Junot; Kenneth Cranham as General Carteaux; Gina Bellman as Catherine Carteaux; Darren Queralt as Denon; Roger Ashton-Griffiths as General Doppet; Anthony Higgins as General Dugommier
2	"Attila the Hun"	Gareth Edwards	Tony Etchells	Dr. Peter Heather, University of Oxford	13 February 2008
Attila and his brother, Bleda, make a pact with the Western Roman Emperor to leave their lands untouched. This sends them to the Eastern Roman Empire instead and they take the city of Naissus, prompting the eastern emperor to buy them off. They leave with their prize but Attila soon kills his brother and returns. After defeating the emperor's army, Chrysaphius and Vigilas attempt to bribe Edeco in order to kill Attila but he betrays them. Attila then attacks the western empire because he feels he must, but in doing so he faces Aetius and a coalition of armies belonging to his enemies. Cast: Kevin Eldon as Romulus; Big Mick as Zercon; Rory McCann as Attila the Hun; Nicholas Boulton as Bleda; Allen Leech as Edeco; Michael Maloney as Vigilas; Jonathan Phillips as Theodosius; Ian Barritt as Chrysaphius; Ian Lindsay as Maximinus; Oliver Cotton as Aetius
3	"Spartacus"	Tim Dunn	Colin Heber-Percy & Lyall B. Watson	Professor Mary Beard, University of Cambridge	29 February 2008
Spartacus, sold as a gladiator, organizes an escape and the Roman army is soon hunting him and his fellow escaped slaves. He and his men attack the Romans and other slaves soon arrive to join them which causes trouble between those who want revenge and Spartacus who wishes to flee to Gaul. After another attack by the Romans, they head for Gaul. Yet, after facing the Romans again and winning, Spartacus's men convince him to attack rather than flee. The Romans, however, push them to the ocean and a final battle ensues. Cast: Anthony Flanagan as Spartacus; Nadia Boussetta as Spartacus's Wife; Jamie Foreman as Slave Trader; Mark Wingett as Batiatus; Johnny Harris as Oenameaus; Andrew Tiernan as Crixus; Robert Glenister as Crassus; Rupert Vansittart as Lentulus
4	"Cortes"	Andrew Grieve	Andrew Grieve	Dr. Caroline Dodds, University of Leicester	15 March 2008
Cortés and his men arrive in Central America in 1521 in search of riches. They cross the mountains and soon become allies with the Tlaxcalans. Once they reach Tenochtitlan, they are invited in but then proceed to insult the Aztec's customs and take their ruler, Moctezuma, hostage. Yet, when it is discovered that Cortés is a criminal, he must leave the city to fight the army that the king has sent after him. When he returns, he finds that a war has started and the battle over Tenochtitlan begins. Cast: Brian McCardie as Hernán Cortés; Nicholas Shaw as Sandoval; Andrew Howard as Alvarado; Niall Macgregor as Velasquez; Vineeta Rishi as Doña Marina; David Maybrick as Lopez; Ramon Tikaram as Moctezuma; TJ Ramini as Cuauhtémoc; Alec Newman as Villafana
5	"Richard the Lionheart"	Nick Green	James Wood	Professor John Gillingham	22 March 2008
During the Third Crusade, the crusaders arrive in Jaffa and find it destroyed. Amidst uneasiness in the ranks and an attack that leaves one of his close friends dead, Richard hopes to marry off his sister to Al Adil and create an alliance. However, Al Adil will not agree and the crusaders begin to suffer from a lack of supplies. Finally, Richard decides not to attack Jerusalem and the coalition falls apart. Eventually he must face the decision of protecting his kingdom from his brother or completing his oath to God. In the end, Richard plans to return home but when Jaffa is assaulted, he returns to rescue his men. Cast: Leon Ockenden as Earl of Leicester; Harry Lloyd as Lucas; Steven Waddington as Richard the Lionheart; Alice Patten as Joan; Stuart Wilson as Hugh De Burgundy; Donald Sumpter as Garnier; Andy Lucas as Saladin; Silas Carson as Al Adil; Daragh O'Malley as William
6	"Shogun"	Arif Nurmohamed	Clare Saxby	Dr. Stephen Turnbull, University of Leeds	29 March 2008
After the Taiko's death in 1598, Ieyasu has his son sent away which upsets Mitsunari. After an attack by Mitsunari, Ieyasu's son, Hidetada, takes his men to find Mitsunari but he escapes. Ieyasu forces Mitsunari into exile and begins to take control of the government. However, when another lord begins to rebel, Ieyasu convinces Hideaki to join him in battle only to have Mitsunari turn him later on. Eventually the two armies meet and the Battle of Sekigahara begins, with Hideaki unable to choose which side to fight for. He eventually chooses Ieyasu and they win the battle, taking control of Japan. Cast: James Saito as Tokugawa Ieyasu; Hiro Kanagawa as Ishida Mitsunari; Togo Igawa as The Taiko; Hiroshi Katsuno as Mototada; Yuji Okumoto as Naomasa; Koh Takeuchi as Hidetada; Henry Hayashi as Ukita; Louis Ozawa Changchien as Hideaki; Kohei Mima as Tadayoshi

== Media information ==
=== DVD release ===
The series was released as a two disc set on Region 2 DVD by BBC Video on 24 March 2008. It was marketed and sold in the United States in April 2009 as "Warriors". The USA release included a third disc containing two Edward Bazalgette documentaries, Hannibal and Genghis Khan.

=== Companion book ===
McLynn, Frank (4 October 2007). Heroes and Villains: Inside the Minds of the Greatest Warriors in History. BBC Books (hardcover). ISBN 978-1-84607-240-6.
