= The Frogs and the Lobsters =

- Starring: Ioan Gruffudd
- Country of origin: United Kingdom
- Original language: English

Original release
- Network: ITV
- Release: 2 April 1999

Related
- The Duchess and the Devil; Mutiny

The Frogs and the Lobsters (also known as The Wrong War) is an episode of the television program Hornblower. It is set during the French Revolutionary Wars and very loosely based on the chapter of the same name in C.S. Forester's 1950 novel Mr. Midshipman Hornblower and on the actual ill-fated Quiberon expedition of 1795.

The main title is based on the often derogatory term for the French used by the British (as well as other English speakers) and on the red coats of the British soldiers. The secondary title deals with Horatio's own duty to the Crown and the alliance with the French and his struggle with his own sympathy towards the French revolutionaries.

== Plot ==
François de Charette is a royalist general who raises a force of French exiles who intend to restore the monarchy. He is supported by the British government, who provide Royal Navy vessels to ferry a combined expeditionary force of French royalist troops (the "frogs") and a contingent of British redcoats (the "lobsters") across the English Channel to Quiberon. The British soon discover that a lieutenant carrying a copy of the orders for the mission has been murdered and the orders stolen.

Captain Pellew, who is in charge of the transports, believes the theft of the orders is the work of French revolutionary spies and begs his superiors to call off the invasion, but they ignore him and the army sets off. While part of the force under Charette heads to Paris intending to raise a royalist army on the way and replace the revolutionary government, Horatio Hornblower is assigned to a small force that is ordered to cover a retreat by holding and, if necessary, blowing up the bridge near the town of Muzillac. Because he speaks French, Hornblower acts as a liaison between British sailors and soldiers and the French royalist leaders. The French officer in charge of the royalist forces in the area, Colonel Marquis de Moncoutant, held feudal authority over the region prior to the revolution. He is obsessed with revenge and erects a guillotine, which he uses to summarily execute republican officials and supporters of the revolution.

Hornblower incites de Moncoutant's wrath by standing up for the townspeople on multiple occasions. After saving a young boy from de Moncoutant, Hornblower meets his sister Mariette, a schoolteacher who is fluent in English. She and Hornblower fall in love, and Hornblower promises to protect her from de Moncoutant's rampage. The French revolutionary forces counterattack, rout the royalists from Muzillac, and execute de Moncoutant with the same guillotine he used on them.

The revolutionaries begin looting and destroying the town, and Hornblower takes Mariette with him when he flees. Kennedy delays destroying the bridge in the hopes that Hornblower will return. Hornblower and Mariette nearly escape, but she is killed by revolutionary troops just before they cross. Kennedy compels Hornblower to leave Mariette behind and cross with him. The bridge is then destroyed and Hornblower, his detachment, and the British troops conduct a disciplined retreat. After Pellew commands Indefatigable to sail closer so the crew can reach the withdrawing troops, he throws off his coat and mans an oar to help maneuver the rescue boat near enough to shore for them to board. When Hornblower asks why they had to take part in a mission doomed to fail, Pellew reminds him that officers are duty-bound to follow orders, whatever they may be.

== Cast ==
- Ioan Gruffudd as Lieutenant Horatio Hornblower
- Robert Lindsay as Captain Sir Edward Pellew
- Jamie Bamber as Acting Lieutenant Archie Kennedy
- Jonathan Coy as Lieutenant Bracegirdle
- Paul Copley as Matthews
- Sean Gilder as Styles
- Peter Vaughan as Admiral Lord Hood
- Samuel West as Major Lord Edrington
- John Shrapnel as François de Charette
- Antony Sher as Marquis de Moncoutant
- Estelle Skornik as Mariette
