= Loyalty (film) =

- Starring: Ioan Gruffudd
- Country of origin: United Kingdom
- Original language: English

Production
- Editor: Keith Palmer

Original release
- Network: ITV
- Release: 5 January 2003

Related
- Retribution; Duty

Loyalty is the seventh film of the British TV film series Hornblower, based on the books by C. S. Forester, particularly Hornblower and the Hotspur. It was released on 5 January 2003, nearly four years after the first four films and nine months after the next two films.

The series received four nominations for the 2004 56th Primetime Emmy Awards: Outstanding Miniseries, Outstanding Art Direction for a Miniseries or Movie, Outstanding Costumes for a Miniseries, Movie or a Special and Outstanding Single-Camera Sound Mixing for a Miniseries or Movie, although it is not clear whether they were for Loyalty or Duty (which was broadcast one day after Loyalty) or both.

== Plot ==
At Cape Clear, Ireland in 1803, HMS Retribution, commanded by Commander Hornblower, has retaken HMS Hotspur from the French. Near the end of the fighting, a cutter is spotted sailing towards Hotspur, with news that the war with France is over. The peace lasts a year and the sailors and officers of the Royal Navy languish on half pay. Meanwhile, Napoleon is making plans across the Channel.

In Portsmouth, Hornblower's promotion to commander was not confirmed, nor does he have a navy posting. As a result, he has to pawn many of his possessions to survive during the peace. By chance, he runs into Lieutenant Bush, also on half pay. Later that night, Hornblower takes Bush to an exclusive establishment, where he plays whist with Admiral Edward Pellew, Captain Hammond, and Hammond's nephew Jack, who aspires to serve under Hornblower. Hornblower's whist winnings are enough to pay the rent he owes to his landlady, Mrs. Mason; Mrs. Mason's daughter Maria is attracted to him.

Pellew gives Hornblower command of HMS Hotspur with orders to sail to Brest to spy on Napoleon. In addition, Hornblower is to take a Frenchman, Major Côtard, to a secret rendezvous with a trusted friend in France. Though he previously outranked Hornblower, Bush agrees to serve as his first lieutenant. Bush signs on a crew for Hotspur, including Boatswain Matthews, Irishman Wolfe, and Boatswain's Mate Styles, who agrees to be Hornblower's steward, though he has no talent for cooking. Jack Hammond also comes aboard as a midshipman, though his eagerness is overshadowed by his apparent ineptitude and cowardice.

Off Brest, Hotspur spots a semaphore telegraph reporting their presence. There is a tense moment when a much more powerful French frigate, Loire, sails toward Hotspur. War has not broken out, and the two ships merely exchange salutes. There is no sign of Major Côtard's contact, and Hornblower regards it as suspicious that Loire was at the rendezvous point. Hornblower and Côtard reconnoiter, disguised as fishermen. They discover an encamped French invasion force, but are spotted and forced to flee. Loire returns, this time to fight, but Hornblower outfoxes and disables the enemy ship before returning to England to warn Pellew.

The British fleet arrives off Brest and Pellew makes plans to attack the French fort based on Hornblower's report: the French fleet is anchored in the outer harbor, protected by a shore battery. Since all British movements are immediately reported by the semaphore, Pellew assigns Hornblower to destroy it, while Hammond will lead a party of Marines to take the shore battery. These two actions will enable Pellew to launch a pre-emptive strike on the French fleet. As Hornblower heads toward the semaphore, Wolfe slips away. After Hornblower completes his mission, he and his party are captured by French troops. Wolfe is revealed to be a traitor, working to liberate Ireland from Britain with French support. Wolfe reveals that another agent is a senior member of the Royal Navy.

Hammond's party lands and are forced to surrender by Wolfe and his waiting men. Wolfe fires Hammond's prearranged signal, falsely informing the fleet that the battery has been taken. The British fleet sails into an ambush, then attempts a withdrawal. Hornblower and his men escape and blow up the fort, enabling Pellew to countermand his withdrawal and attack the French ships. Hornblower and his men then run into Wolfe and Hammond, who is revealed to be the senior officer betraying the Royal Navy. Hammond orders Wolfe to kill Hornblower and his greatly outnumbered men. However, Bush arrives with reinforcements. A battle ensues, during which Jack Hammond dies bravely. Wolfe escapes, while Hammond, distraught over the death of his nephew, commits suicide. Afterward, Hornblower's report states that Hammond died heroically for England, to avoid inflaming the many Irishmen serving in the Royal Navy.

Back in Portsmouth, Hornblower visits the Masons, but has an argument with Maria. As Hornblower is about to leave, Mrs. Mason tells him Maria wept for him while he was gone. Horatio then asks Maria to marry him; she accepts.

== Cast ==
- Ioan Gruffudd as Commander Horatio Hornblower
- Robert Lindsay as Admiral Pellew
- Paul McGann as 1st Lieutenant William Bush
- Paul Copley as Matthews, Boatswain
- Sean Gilder as Styles, Steward
- Lorcan Cranitch as Wolfe
- Ian McElhinney as Captain Hammond
- Greg Wise as Major Côtard
- Tony Haygarth as Master Prowse
- Julia Sawalha as Maria Mason
- Barbara Flynn as Mrs. Mason
- Christian Coulson as Midshipman Jack Hammond
- Ron Cook as Steward James Doughty
- Jonathan Forbes as Midshipman Charles Orrock
- Jim McManus as Pawnbroker
- John Sheahan as Irishman
- Neil Conrich as Bailiff
- Simon Delaney as French Midshipman
