= The Even Chance =

- Genre: Action-adventure; Costume drama
- Based on: Mr. Midshipman Hornblower by C. S. Forester
- Screenplay by: Russell Lewis
- Directed by: Andrew Grieve
- Starring: Ioan Gruffudd; Robert Lindsay; Dorian Healy; Michael Byrne; Robert Bathurst
- Theme music composer: John E. Keane
- Country of origin: United Kingdom
- Original language: English

Production
- Producer: Andrew Benson
- Cinematography: Neve Cunningham
- Editor: Keith Palmer
- Running time: 100 minutes
- Production companies: Celtic Films; United Productions; Meridian Broadcasting; A&E Television Networks
- Budget: £3 million

Original release
- Network: ITV
- Release: 7 October 1998

Related
- The Examination for Lieutenant

The Even Chance is the first of eight Hornblower television adaptations relating the exploits of Horatio Hornblower, the protagonist in a series of novels and short stories by C.S. Forester. The Even Chance is the name given to the film in the United Kingdom, while in the United States it is known by the alternative title The Duel.

== Plot ==
In January 1793, 17-year-old midshipman Horatio Hornblower is assigned to his first posting, the ship of the line HMS Justinian. Hornblower is introduced to his shipmates, including his superior, Midshipman Jack Simpson, a bully quick to single him out for abuse and scorn. Hornblower embarrasses himself when he becomes seasick while the ship is at anchor in calm waters, and he finds life under Simpson unbearable.

After contemplating suicide, Hornblower seizes an opportunity to challenge Simpson to a duel. His friend, Midshipman Clayton, feels guilty that he has not previously stood against Simpson. He knocks Hornblower unconscious and takes his place. Simpson, a seasoned duelist, kills Clayton while sustaining only a minor wound to the shoulder. Hornblower arrives just in time to speak with Clayton before he dies.

Hornblower is transferred to the frigate HMS Indefatigable (known by her crew as Indy), under the command of Captain Pellew. Midshipmen Kennedy, Hether, and Cleveland go with him; Pellew's fury over the duel leads him to appoint Hornblower as commander of Simpson's former division. Hornblower's decision to place his trust in them and refusal to permit the laziness and unruly behavior fostered by Simpson, as well as his capability in battle and concern for their wellbeing, wins him the division's respect and loyalty.

When Indefatigable captures the French merchantman Marie Gallante, Hornblower and his division are tasked with sailing the ship to port as a prize. Hornblower soon discovers it is sinking and beyond repair, forcing him to issue the order to abandon ship. In close quarters on the lifeboat, the French captain and his men quickly overpower the prize crew, and Hornblower surrenders his navigational chart, but drops his compass overboard. He later informs Matthews that in anticipation of the French prisoners gaining the upper hand, he deliberately mispositioned their location on the chart. The French captain attempts to sail to France by reversing course, but quickly becomes lost. Hornblower and his men regain the upper hand, and the lifeboat is soon afterward intercepted by Indefatigable, where Hornblower receives the accolades of the crew.

Simpson joins Indefatigable after Justinian is sunk by the French warship Papillon. Pellew orders a detachment to enter the Gironde estuary and board and capture Papillon by moonlight. During the battle, Kennedy is incapacitated by a seizure and left in the boarding party's boat. Simpson takes advantage of the confusion to cut the boat free. When Hornblower attempts to lower Papillon's main topsail, Simpson shoots at him. The bullet grazes his head, and he falls unconscious into the water, where he is rescued by Seaman Finch.

Indy is attacked by three French ships. Papillon attempts to render assistance but comes under fire from French shore batteries. Lieutenant Chadd is killed, and Lieutenant Eccleston is mortally wounded, but before Eccleston succumbs he orders Hornblower to assume command. As senior midshipman, Simpson attempts to take charge, but Hornblower asserts his authority and orders Sailing Master Bowles to detain Simpson and shoot him if he resists. Simpson is held under guard while Papillon sails to Indy's rescue.

Hornblower orders Papillon's French colors to remain flying. By posing as a French vessel, he launches a surprise assault on the fleet attacking Indefatigable and succeeds at driving them off. Hornblower accuses Simpson of an attempt on his life. When Simpson demands his right to a duel to settle the matter, Pellew permits Hornblower to accept.

Simpson shoots before the command to fire, then falsely claims it was an accident. Hornblower is not badly injured and prepares to return fire. Simpson begs for his life, revealing himself as a coward. Hornblower fires into the air, stating that Simpson is "not worth the powder". Infuriated at this insult, Simpson pulls a dagger and tries to stab Hornblower in the back. Pellew, who had been watching from a distance, uses the rifle of one of his marine guards to kill Simpson with a well-aimed shot.

Back aboard Indefatigable, Pellew tells Hornblower how impressed he has been by the young officer's actions and states that Hornblower has a great career ahead of him if he continues as he has begun.

== Cast ==
- Ioan Gruffudd as Midshipman Horatio Hornblower
- Robert Lindsay as Captain Edward Pellew
- Dorian Healy as Midshipman Jack Simpson
- Michael Byrne as Captain Keene
- Robert Bathurst as Lieutenant Eccleston
- Duncan Bell as Midshipman Clayton
- Paul Copley as Boatswain Matthews
- Sean Gilder as Boatswain's Mate Styles
- Simon Sherlock as Seaman Oldroyd
- Chris Barnes as Seaman Finch
- Jamie Bamber as Midshipman Archie Kennedy

== Differences from the novel ==
This episode does not follow the plot of the corresponding chapter in C. S. Forester's Mr. Midshipman Hornblower. In the original story, the mathematically minded Hornblower secures himself an "even chance" against a more skilled adversary. As the offended party, he has the choice of weapons. He asks that only one of the duelling pistols be loaded, the combatants having to toss for it and then stand a yard apart and fire at each other at point blank range. As it turns out, the captain has secretly given orders that neither weapon be loaded, the resulting lack of a shot blamed on a misfire, and Hornblower comes out of the duel unscathed. Suspecting the truth, Hornblower proposes to challenge the captain to a duel, only to be told that such a challenge would be unlawful.

The episode also incorporates material from several other stories in Mr. Midshipman Hornblower. Among these are "Hornblower and the Cargo of Rice", for Hornblower's ill-fated command of the Marie Galante, and the chapter "Hornblower and the Man Who Felt Queer", for the section concerning the Indefatigable's expedition against the Papillon. The episode also diverges from the plot of this chapter in several respects, mostly related to the addition of Simpson and Kennedy to the event (in the book, Simpson is not transferred to Indefatigable, and Kennedy does not take part in the expedition).
