= Andrew Grieve =

British television and film director (born 1939)

- Born: 28 November 1939 (age 86); Cardiff, Wales
- Occupations: Television and film director
- Awards: Golden Shell; 1988 On the Black Hill; Silver FIPA; 1999 Hornblower

Andrew Grieve (born 28 November 1939) is a British television and film director. Grieve's credits include Wire in the Blood. On the Black Hill, the screenplay of which he also wrote, won the Golden Shell at the San Sebastian Film Festival in 1988. He has also directed episodes of Agatha Christie's Poirot and Hornblower. His work on Hornblower won him the Silver FIPA at the Biarritz International Festival of Audiovisual Programming in 1999. He has since written and directed the BBC drama-documentary Heroes and Villains episode on Hernán Cortés.
