= Hornblower (TV series) =

Series of British television films

- UK DVD cover
- Based on: Mr. Midshipman Hornblower; Lieutenant Hornblower; Hornblower and the Hotspur by C. S. Forester
- Directed by: Andrew Grieve
- Starring: Ioan Gruffudd; Robert Lindsay; Paul McGann; Paul Copley; Sean Gilder; Jamie Bamber
- Country of origin: United Kingdom
- Original language: English
- No. of episodes: 8

Production
- Running time: 120 minutes
- Production company: Meridian Broadcasting

Original release
- Network: ITV
- Release: 7 October 1998 – 6 January 2003

Hornblower is a series of British historical fiction war television films based on three of C. S. Forester's ten novels about the fictional character Horatio Hornblower, a Royal Navy officer during the French Revolutionary and Napoleonic Wars.

The series ran from 7 October 1998 until 6 January 2003, with Ioan Gruffudd in the title role. It was produced by the British broadcaster ITV Meridian, and was shown on ITV in the UK and A&E in the US. It is often repeated on ITV4.

== Cast ==
Main cast members

- Ioan Gruffudd as Horatio Hornblower
- Robert Lindsay as Sir Edward Pellew
- Dorian Healy as Midshipman Jack Simpson (The Even Chance)
- Michael Byrne as Captain Keene (The Even Chance)
- Robert Bathurst as Lieutenant Eccleston (The Even Chance)
- Denis Lawson as Captain "Dreadnought" Foster (The Examination for Lieutenant)
- Ian McNeice as Tapling (The Examination for Lieutenant)
- Andrew Tiernan as Bunting (The Examination for Lieutenant)
- Cherie Lunghi as Duchess of Wharfedale (The Duchess and the Devil)
- Christopher Fulford as Midshipman Hunter (The Duchess and the Devil)
- Ronald Pickup as Don Massaredo (The Duchess and the Devil)
- Antony Sher as Marquis de Moncoutant (The Frogs and the Lobsters)
- Samuel West as Major Lord Edrington (The Frogs and the Lobsters)
- John Shrapnel as François de Charette (The Frogs and the Lobsters)
- Peter Vaughan as Admiral Lord Hood (The Frogs and the Lobsters)
- David Warner as Captain James Sawyer (episodes 5–6)
- Nicholas Jones as Lieutenant Buckland (episodes 5–6)
- Philip Glenister as Gunner Hobbs (episodes 5–6)
- Jamie Bamber as Archie Kennedy (episodes 5–6; recurring episodes 1, 3–4)
- David Rintoul as Dr. Clive (episodes 5–6)
- Paul Copley as Matthews (episodes 5–8; recurring episodes 1–4)
- Sean Gilder as Styles (episodes 5–8; recurring episodes 1–4)
- Paul McGann as Lieutenant William Bush (episodes 5–8)
- Lorcan Cranitch as Wolfe (episodes 7–8)
- Tony Haygarth as Master Prowse (episodes 7–8)
- Julia Sawalha as Maria Mason (episodes 7–8)
- Barbara Flynn as Mrs. Mason (episodes 7–8)
- Greg Wise as Major Côtard (Loyalty)
- Jim Carter as Etheridge (Duty)
- Ron Cook as Steward James Doughty (Duty)

Supporting cast members

- Simon Sherlock as Oldroyd (episodes 1–4)
- Chris Barnes as Finch (episodes 1–2)
- Colin MacLachlan as Master Bowles (episodes 1–4)
- Jonathan Coy as Bracegirdle (episodes 2–4, 8)
- Ian McElhinney as Captain Hammond (episodes 2, 6–7)
- Christian Coulson as Midshipman Jack Hammond (Loyalty)
- Jonathan Forbes as Midshipman Charles Orrock (episodes 7–8)

== The film series ==
The series consists of eight television films, which are notable for their high production values. All were later released on DVD (with the original aspect ratio of 16:9 widescreen in Europe and 4:3 in the US). In the US, the series was retitled Horatio Hornblower, and some of the films were known by different titles. The eight films cover the events of just three of the ten novels (Mr. Midshipman Hornblower, Lieutenant Hornblower, and Hornblower and the Hotspur), and various alterations and additions are made to the source material (e.g., the recurring characters of Lt. Archie Kennedy, Matthews and Styles).

No.	Date Aired	Episode Name	Directed by	Written by
1	7 October 1998	The Even Chance (U.S. title: The Duel)	Andrew Grieve	Russell Lewis
2	18 November 1998	The Examination for Lieutenant (U.S. title: The Fire Ship and The Fire Ships)	Andrew Grieve	Mike Cullen
3	24 February 1999	The Duchess and the Devil	Andrew Grieve	Patrick Harbinson
4	2 April 1999	The Frogs and the Lobsters (U.S. title: The Wrong War)	Andrew Grieve	Chris Ould
5	8 April 2001	Mutiny	Andrew Grieve	T. R. Bowen
6	15 April 2001	Retribution	Andrew Grieve	Ben Rostul
7	5 January 2003	Loyalty	Andrew Grieve	Niall Leonard
8	6 January 2003	Duty	Andrew Grieve	Stephen Churchett

== Production ==
Captain Pellew's ship, HMS Indefatigable, is represented by the Grand Turk, a modern copy of the 1741 frigate HMS Blandford. To represent Hornblower's ship, HMS Hotspur, the Earl of Pembroke, a civilian ship, underwent some conversion. The Baltic trading schooner Julia and the brig Phoenix of Dell Quay were used to represent the smaller vessels. No real 74-gun ship existed any longer at the time of production (the last one, HMS Implacable, was scuttled in 1949), so HMS Justinian and HMS Renown had to be recreated as models. For the first series a quarter of a 74-gun ship (one exterior side and three open sides to shoot live action on several decks) called the pontoon was built. Later live action on the quarterdeck or the gundeck below was shot on the actual HMS Victory. Eleven scale models, ranging from 4.5 to 7 m in length, were used for the battle scenes, the largest weighing 1400 kg, and made with working rigging and cannons that were fired by remote control. Shooting locations included the Black Sea, the Livadia Palace, Portugal, and the former administration (Melville) building of the Royal William Yard and the Barbican, Plymouth in England.

== Awards ==
- Primetime Emmy Award for Outstanding Miniseries (1999)
- Primetime Emmy Award for Outstanding Single-Camera Picture Editing for a Miniseries or Movie (1999)

== Series continuation ==
Ioan Gruffudd had shown interest in participating in more Hornblower films. In 2007, he reportedly discussed the possibility of a big-screen version of Hornblower, and had been attempting to gain the rights to the books by C. S. Forester."
