= Sean Gilder =

English actor

- Born: Sean Brian Gilder; Brampton, Cumberland, England
- Education: Queen Mary, University of London (BA (Hons)); Webber Douglas Academy of Dramatic Art
- Occupations: Actor, playwright
- Years active: 1989–present

Sean Brian Gilder is an English stage, film and screen actor and playwright. He is best known for his portrayal of Styles on Hornblower and Paddy Maguire on Shameless from 2005 to 2010.

== Early life and education ==
Sean Brian Gilder was born in Brampton, Cumberland, England.

He attended Queen Mary, University of London, where he earned a BA (Hons) in Modern History and Third World Studies. He then trained at the Webber Douglas Academy of Dramatic Art and entered the profession in 1987.

Gilder is a fan of Fulham Football Club. He told Football Muse that he has had a season ticket at the club since 2018.

== Career ==
=== Film and television ===
In Mike Bassett: England Manager (2001), Glider was one of the journalists. He has appeared in Doctor Who (as the Sycorax Leader) as well as New Tricks, Gangs of New York, The Fall, and the 2004 film, King Arthur.

He portrayed Styles on Hornblower and Paddy Maguire on Shameless from 2005 to 2010. In March 2008, Gilder appeared as Paddy's gay twin brother Noel in Shameless; however, in a trick to viewers, Noel was credited as being played by Neil Grades, an anagram of Sean Gilder. On 3 April 2008, he appeared on The Paul O'Grady Show alongside fellow Shameless star Alice Barry, who played Lillian Tyler.

In June 2017, he appeared in the third series of the BBC drama Poldark, as Tholly Tregirls.

He has appeared in a recurring role in Apple TV+’s Slow Horses, based on the book series by Mick Herron.

=== Stage ===
In January 2014, Gilder played Bosola in The Duchess of Malfi, opposite Gemma Arterton, in the inaugural production at the Sam Wanamaker Theatre.

He appeared in the National Theatre production of Dear England in various roles in the England football team, including Physio Phil, and managers Sam Allardyce and Fabio Capello.

== Filmography ==
=== Film and television ===
Year	Film/Show	Role
1989	May to December – "Send in the Clowns"	Shop Assistant
1990	On the Up	Policeman ⟨uncredited⟩
1994	Knowing Me, Knowing You with Alan Partridge – Show 5	Liam Partridge
1995	The Innocent Sleep	Johnny
1995	The Bill – "Done Is Done"	Billy McRae
1995	Rich Deceiver	Sean Murphy
1995	Resort to Murder	PC Graham
1996	Bugs – "Gold Rush"	Maximillian Kristo
1996	"Soldier Soldier – Flash Point"	Cpl Ewan Dalglish
1996	Clancy's Kitchen	Nick
1996	A Touch of Frost – "Unknown Soldier"	Corporal Devenish
1996	Circles of Deceit: Kalon	Tartleton
1996	Our Friends in the North – "1984"	PC Lukoschek
1997	Touching Evil – Season 1 Episode 1 and 3	Steve Carroll
1997	The Investigator (aka Out of Line)	Sgr. Jamie Kennedy
1998	Far From the Madding Crowd	Joseph Poorgrass
1998	Hornblower: The Even Chance (aka The Duel)	Styles
1998	Hornblower: The Examination for Lieutenant (aka The Fire Ship)	Styles
1999	Hornblower: The Duchess and the Devil	Styles
1999	Hornblower: The Frogs and the Lobsters (aka The Wrong War)	Styles
1999	Say You'll Be Mine	
1999	Dangerfield – "Instinct"	Kevin Bishop
1999	The Bill – "Hot Money"	Jerry Mulligan
2000	Honest	The Hawk
2000	Don Quixote	Captain
2000	The Vice – "Force of Nature"	Sam Shepley
2000	The Knock	Mark
2000	Hornblower: Mutiny	Styles
2000	Hornblower: Retribution	Styles
2001	Mike Bassett: England Manager	Reporter
2002	Ultimate Force – "The Killing of a One-Eyed Bookie"	
2003	Hornblower: Loyalty	Styles
2003	Hornblower: Duty	Styles
2003	State of Play	DS Mark 'Chewy' Cheweski
2003	Gangs of New York	Dog fight referee
2004	King Arthur	Jols
2004	The Bill – "Dinferent Kind of Justice"	John Kirkby
2005–2010	Shameless	Paddy Maguire
2006	Doctor Who – "The Christmas Invasion"	The Sycorax Leader
2006	The Fall	Walt Purdy
2006	New Tricks	Andy Benton
2007	Life on Mars – Episode 16	Leslie Johns
2008	Shameless	Noel Maguire
2011	The Shadow Line	Robert Beatty
2011	Inspector George Gently – Episode 10 "Gently Upside Down"	Joe Claverton
2012	Kidnap and Ransom	TBC
2013	The Selfish Giant	Kitten
2015	Silent Witness – "Sniper's Nest"	Jim Clout
2015	Sons of Liberty	Thomas Hutchinson
2015	Midsomer Murders Episode 17.3 "The Ballad of Somer County"	Danny Carver
2015	The Last Kingdom	Wulfhere
2016	Jericho	Moses Kemble
2016	Penny Dreadful	Marshal Franklin Ostow
2016–2020	Our Girl	Max Lane
2016	Vera	Bobby
2017–2018	Poldark	Tholly Tregirls
2020	Cursed	Bors
2020	White House Farm	CS George Harris
2021	Death in Paradise	Skip Marden
2022	The Road Dance	Peter
2022	Sherwood	Dean Simmons
2022-2024	Slow Horses	Sam Chapman
2023	The Gold	DI Carter
2023	Starve Acre	Gordon
2024	Passenger	Tony Corrigan
2025	Bad Apples	Frank
2026	The Witness	DCS Nicholas Campbell

=== Video games ===
Year	Film/Show	Role
2014	Alien: Isolation	Henry Marlow
