= List of ships present at International Festival of the Sea, 2005 =

List of ships present at the International Festival of the Sea, 2005 at H.M. Naval Base Portsmouth

== Algeria ==
- El Kirch - Djebel Chinoise-class corvette

== Australia ==
- Anzac - Anzac-class long-range escort frigate designed to carry out air defence. Named in honour of the Australian-New Zealand Army Corps who fought in World War I.

== Bulgaria ==
- Kaliakra - barquentine

== Brazil ==
- Cisne Branco - tall ship

== Colombia ==
- Gloria - tall ship

== Denmark ==
- Esbern Snare
- Georg Stage - sail training ship

== France ==
- Meuse - Durance-class tanker
- Belle Poule - schooner
- La Recouvrance - schooner
- Mutin - cutter
- Renard - replica cutter

== Germany ==
- Sachsen - Sachsen-class frigate
- Asta

== Greece ==
- Hydra - Hydra-class frigate

== India ==
- Mumbai - Delhi-class destroyer
- Tarangini - tall ship

== Indonesia ==
- Dewaruci - tall ship

== Ireland ==
- Eithne - Eithne-class patrol vessel
- Asgard II - brigantine

== Italy ==
- Amerigo Vespucci - tall ship

== Latvia ==
- Virsaitis

== Lithuania ==
- Kursis

== Netherlands ==
- Rotterdam - Rotterdam-class amphibious transport dock
- Europa - barque
- Urania
- Swan fan Makkum - brigantine
- Artemis
- Mercedes

== Nigeria ==
- Aradu - Meko 360 frigate

== Norway ==
- Sørlandet - tall ship

== Oman ==
- Al Mua'zzar
- Shabab Oman - barquentine

== Pakistan ==
- Tippu Sultan
- Moawin

== Poland ==
- Generał Tadeusz Kościuszko - Oliver Hazard Perry-class frigate
- Iskra
- Pogoria - barquentine
- Dar Młodzieży

== Portugal ==
- Álvares Cabral - Vasco da Gama-class frigate
- Sagres - tall ship

== Romania ==
- Regina Maria - Type 22 frigate

== Russia ==
- Admiral Levchenko - Udaloy-class destroyer
- Mir

== Serbia & Montenegro ==
- Jadran

== South Africa ==
- Drakensberg

== South Korea ==
- Chun Jee
- Chungmugong Yi Sun-shin - Chungmugong Yi Sun-class destroyer

== Turkey ==
- Oruc Reis - Barbaros-class frigate

== Uruguay ==
- Capitan Miranda

== United Kingdom ==
=== Royal Navy ===
- Illustrious - Invincible-class aircraft carrier
- Endurance - Ice patrol ship
- Nottingham - Type 42 destroyer
- Marlborough - Type 23 frigate
- Ledbury - Hunt-class mine countermeasures vessel
- Cumberland - Type 22 frigate
- St Albans - Type 23 frigate
- Tyne - River-class patrol vessel
- Walney - Sandown-class mine countermeasures vessel
- Fort Victoria - Fleet replenishment ship

=== Civilian ===
- Bessie Ellen
- Lord Nelson
- Kitty
- Phoenix - tall ship
- Prince William - tall ship
- Pickle - replica of HMS Pickle topsail schooner
- Royalist - brig
- Will
- Grand Turk - replica Sixth-rate frigate
- Tenacious
- B&Q/Castorama - Dame Ellen MacArthurs record breaking trimaran.
- James Clark Ross - British Antarctic Survey Vessel
- m.v. 'Asperity' - 3778 Dwt Clean Oil Product Tanker.
- s.s. 'Shieldhall' - member of the National Historic Fleet.

== United States ==
- Pride of Baltimore II

== See also ==
- Trafalgar 200
- International Fleet Review
- List of ships present at International Fleet Review, 2005
