= List of ships present at International Fleet Review 2005 =

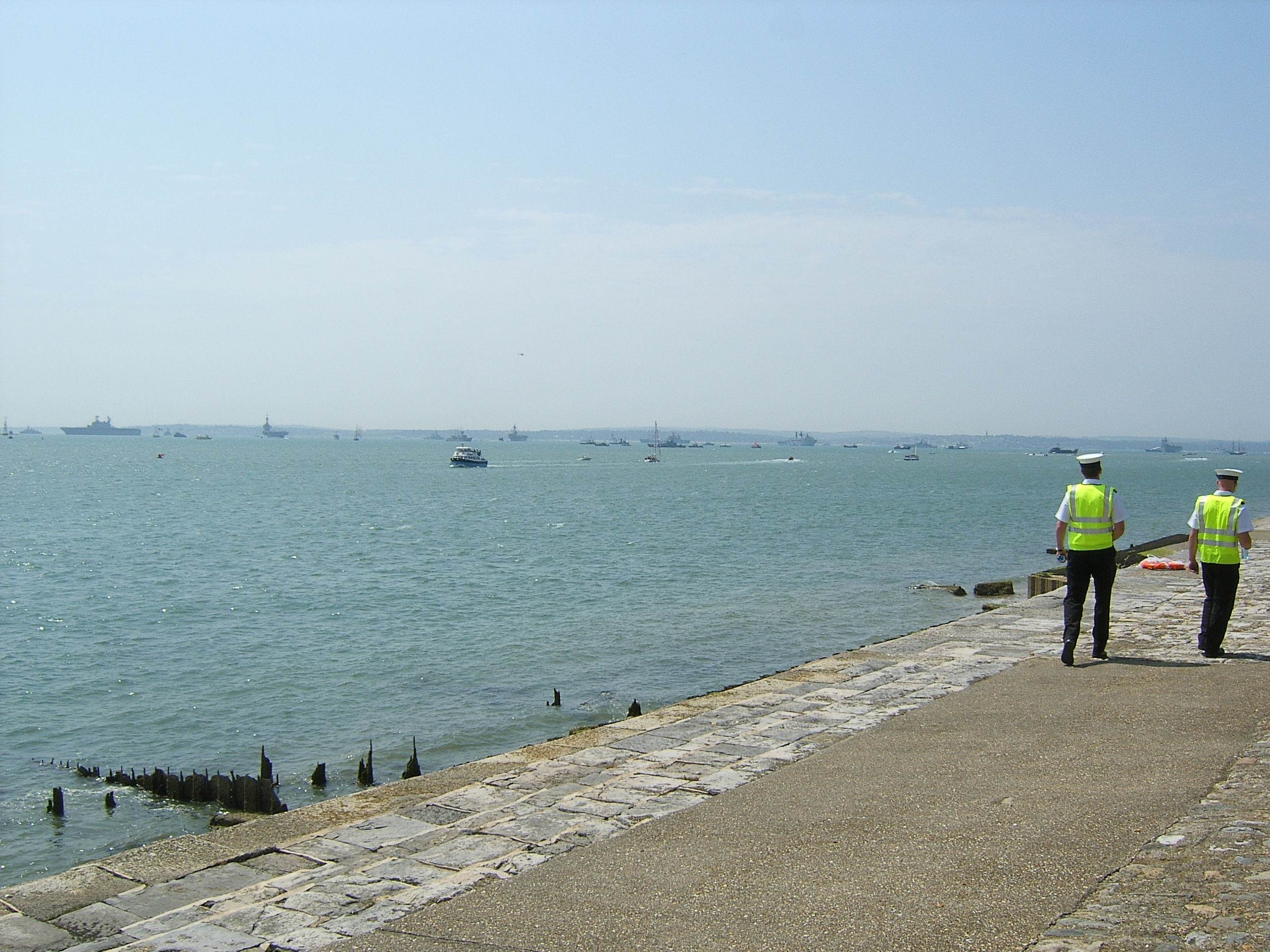
International Fleet Review seen from Fort Blockhouse in Gosport.

List of ships present at the International Fleet Review, Portsmouth, July 2005. None of the photographs were taken at the Review unless otherwise noted.

== Navy representatives ==
=== Royal Navy ===
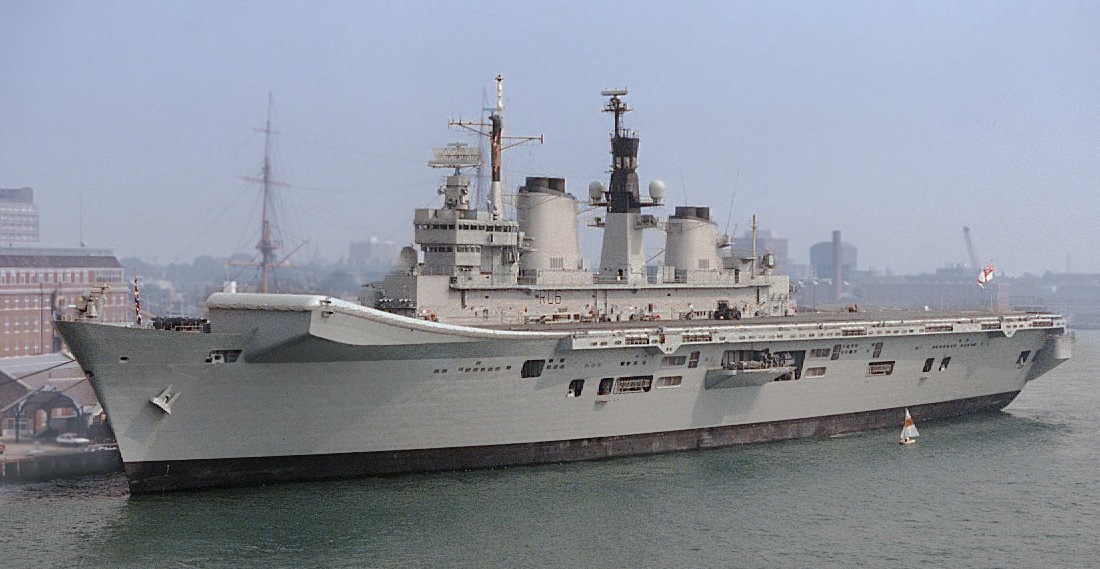
HMS Illustrious

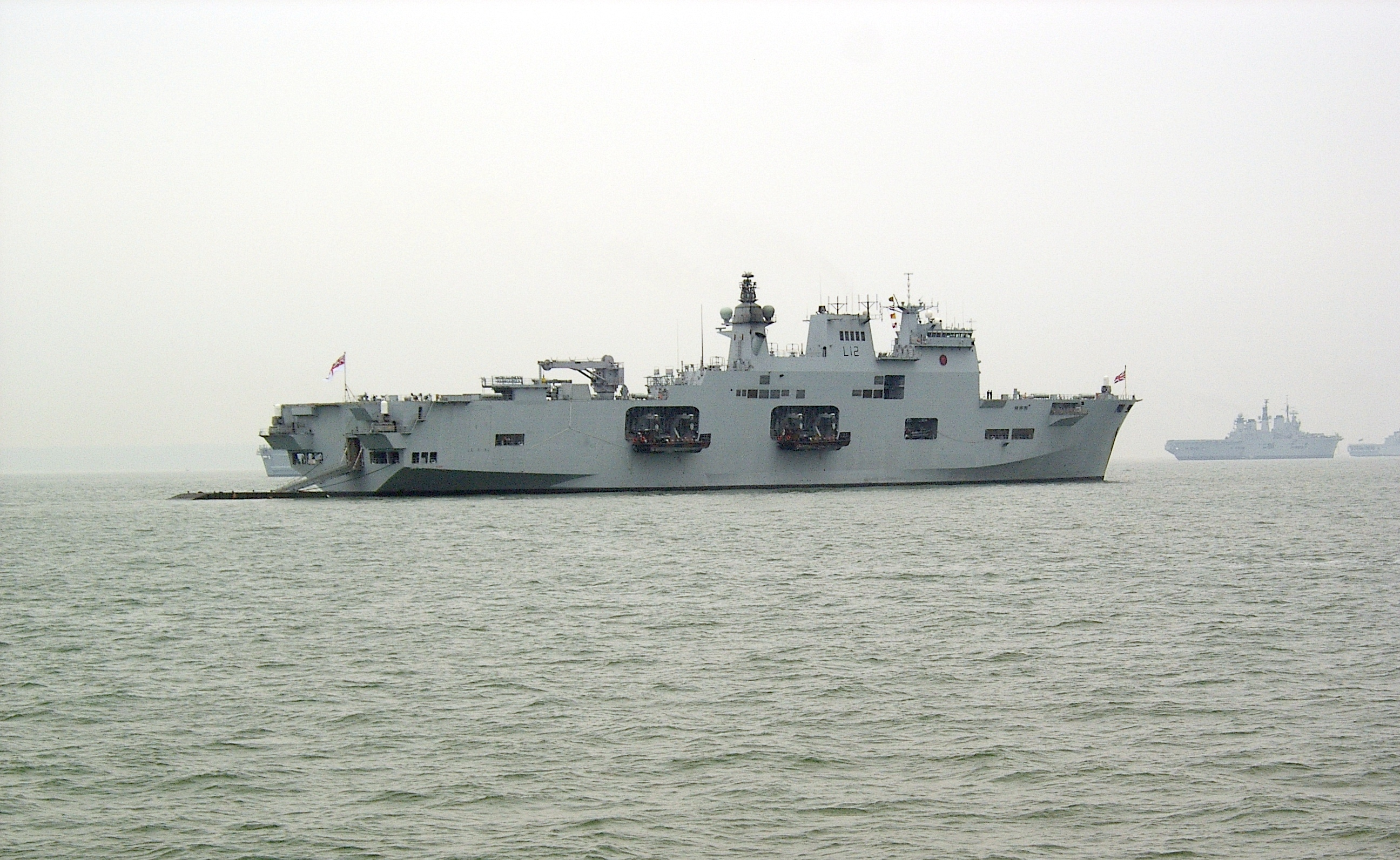
HMS Ocean at the review

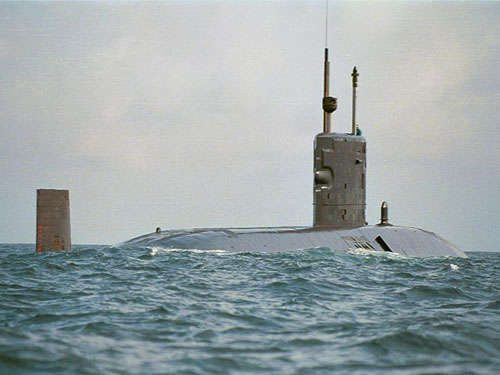
HMS Trafalgar

==== Aircraft carriers ====
- HMS Invincible
- HMS Illustrious

==== Amphibious landing ships ====
- HMS Ocean
- HMS Albion
- HMS Bulwark
- RFA Sir Galahad
- RFA Sir Tristram
- RFA Sir Bedivere

==== Submarines ====
- Trafalgar-class submarine
  - HMS Trafalgar
  - HMS Turbulent
  - HMS Trenchant

==== Destroyers ====
- Type 42
  - HMS Exeter
  - HMS Southampton
  - HMS Nottingham
  - HMS Gloucester
  - HMS Cardiff

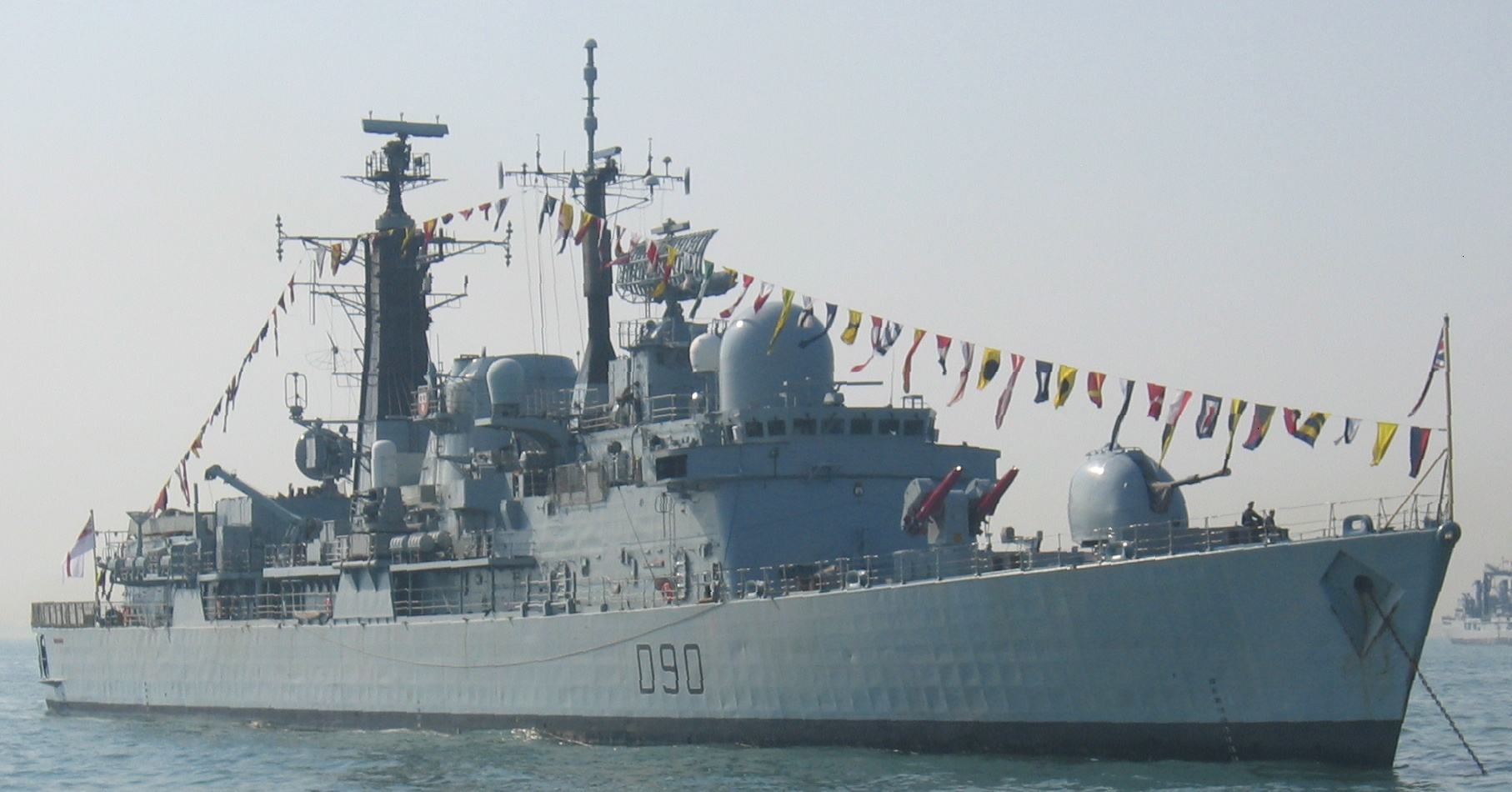
HMS Southampton at the review.

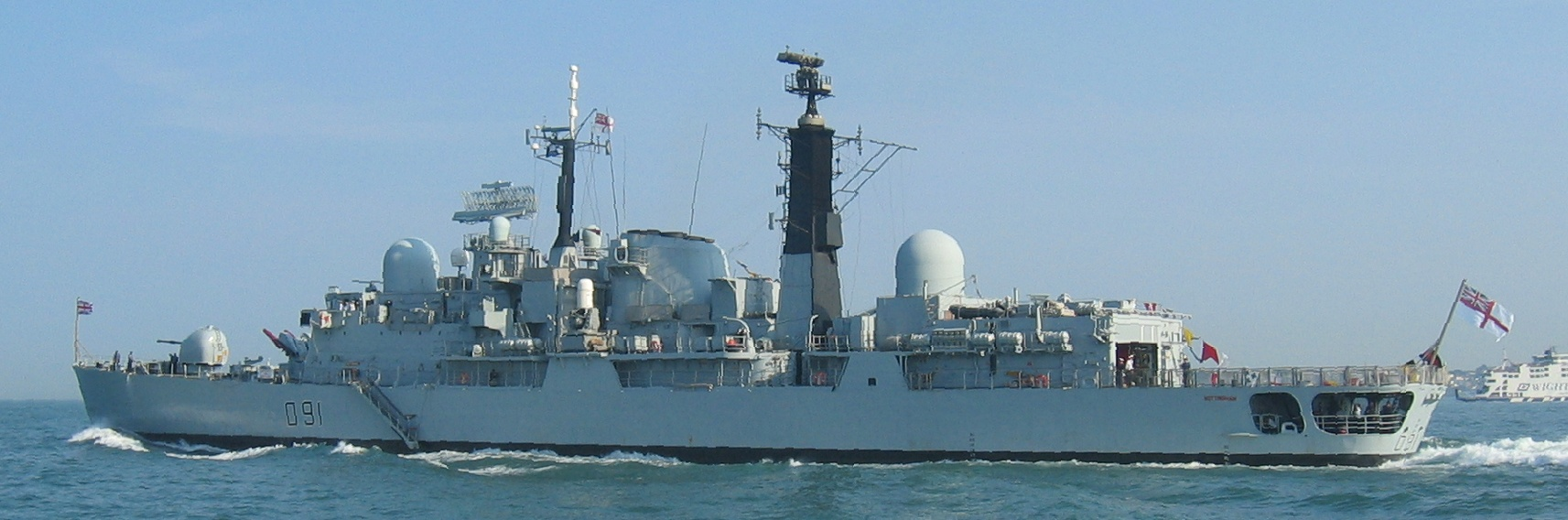
HMS Nottingham at the review rehearsal

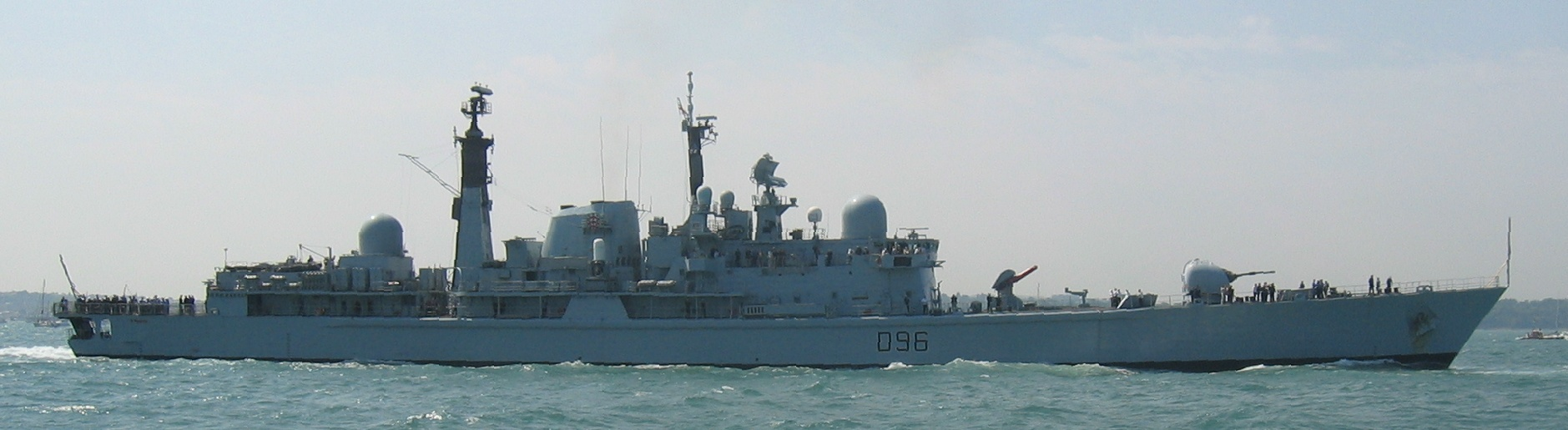
HMS Gloucester at the review

==== Frigates ====
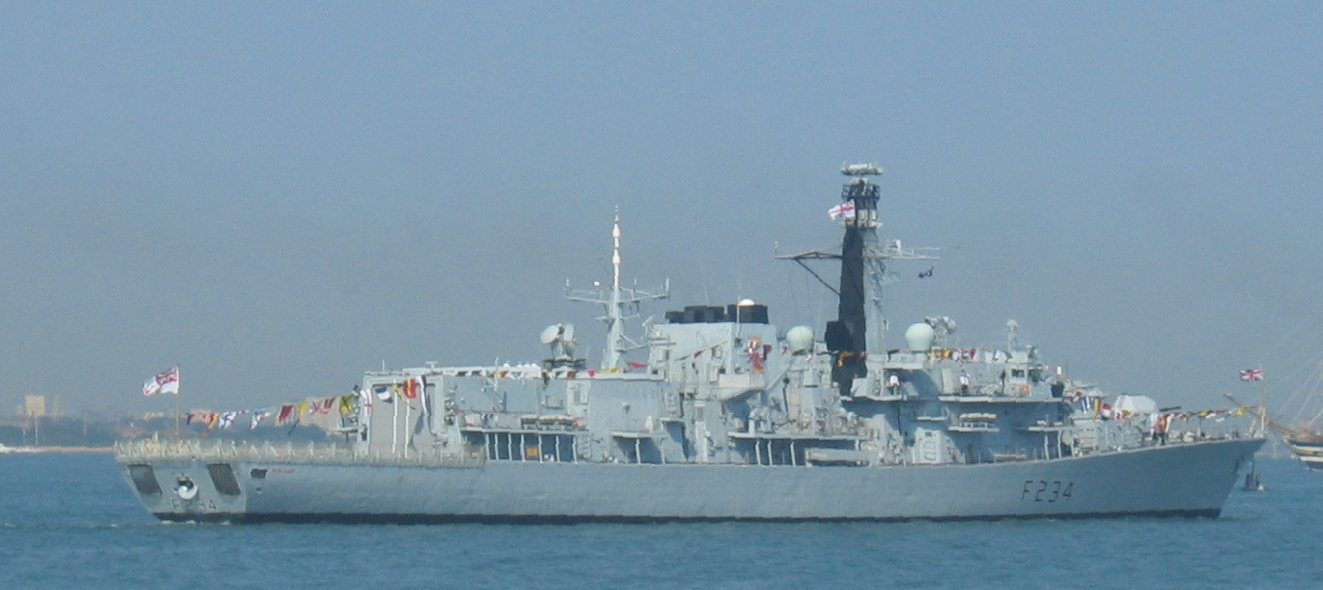
HMS Iron Duke at the review

- Type 22
  - HMS Chatham
  - HMS Cumberland
- Type 23
  - HMS Grafton
  - HMS Lancaster
  - HMS Iron Duke
  - HMS Marlborough
  - HMS Montrose
  - HMS Westminster
  - HMS St Albans

==== Survey vessels ====
- Coastal survey vessels
  - HMS Roebuck
  - HMSML Gleaner
- Ocean survey vessels
  - HMS Scott
- Echo-class survey ship
  - HMS Enterprise

==== Antarctic patrol vessel ====
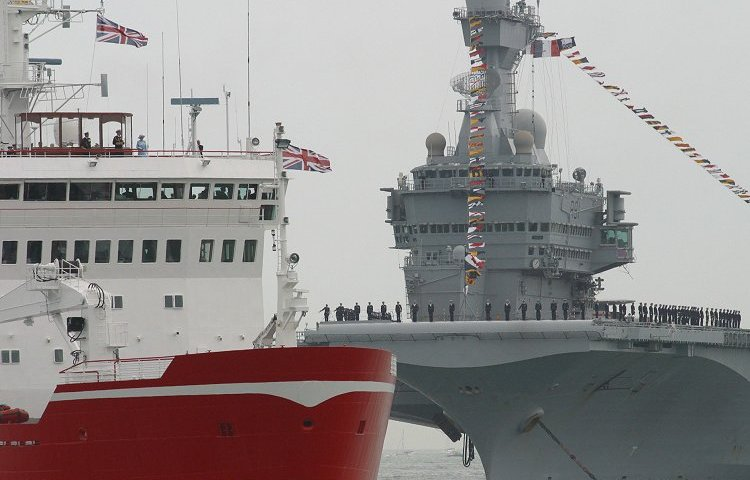
HMS Endurance passing the Charles de Gaulle during the review

- HMS Endurance

==== Patrol vessels ====
- River-class patrol vessel
  - HMS Tyne
- Archer-class patrol vessel
  - HMS Archer
  - HMS Blazer
  - HMS Example
  - HMS Explorer
  - HMS Raider
  - HMS Ranger
  - HMS Trumpeter
  - HMS Tracker

==== Mine countermeasures vessels ====
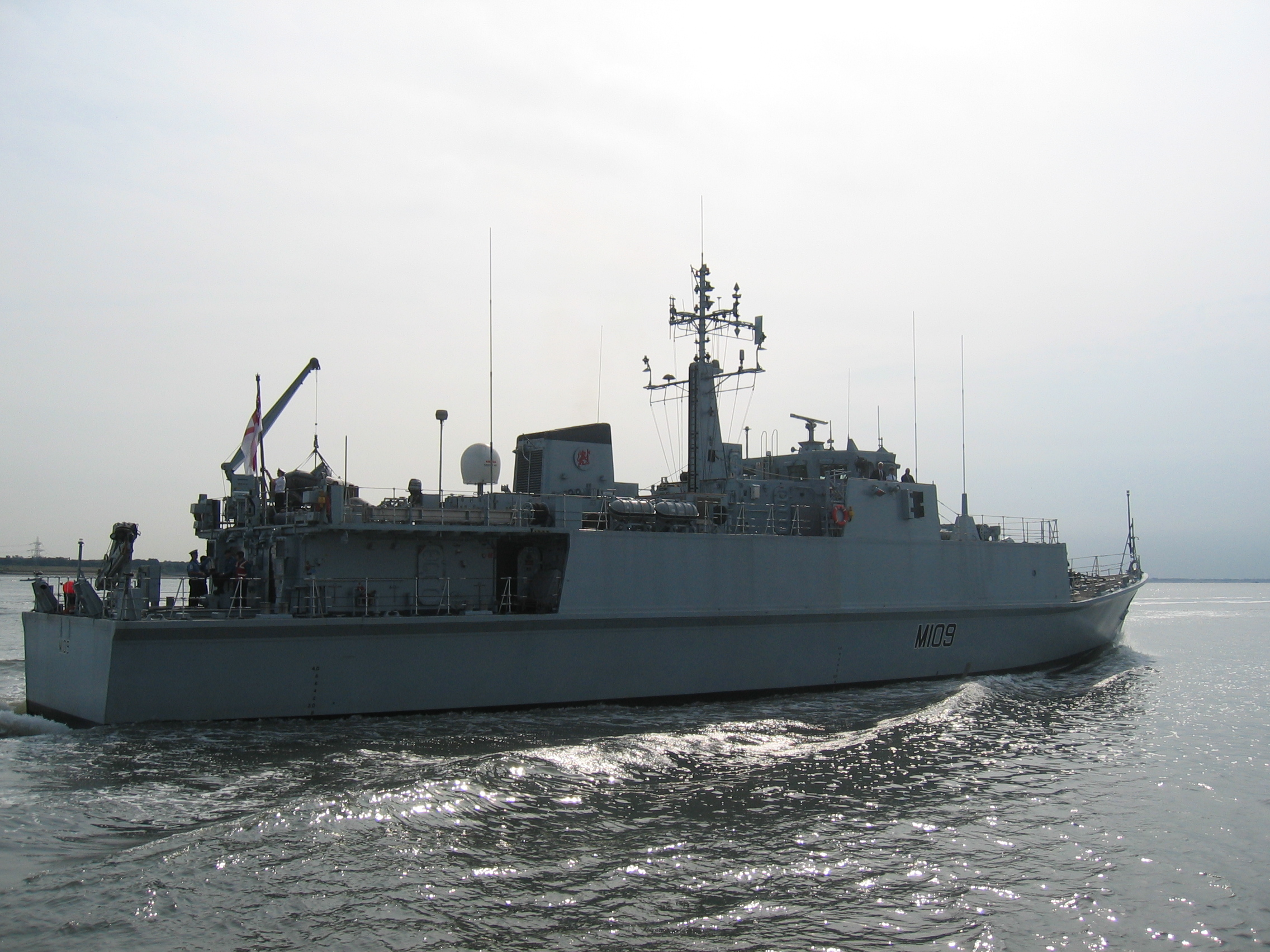
HMS Bangor sweeping Southampton Water in preparation for the review

- Hunt-class MCMVs
  - HMS Ledbury
  - HMS Cattistock
  - HMS Middleton
- Sandown-class minehunters
  - HMS Walney
  - HMS Pembroke
  - HMS Grimsby
  - HMS Bangor
  - HMS Ramsey
  - HMS Shoreham

==== Royal Fleet Auxiliary ====
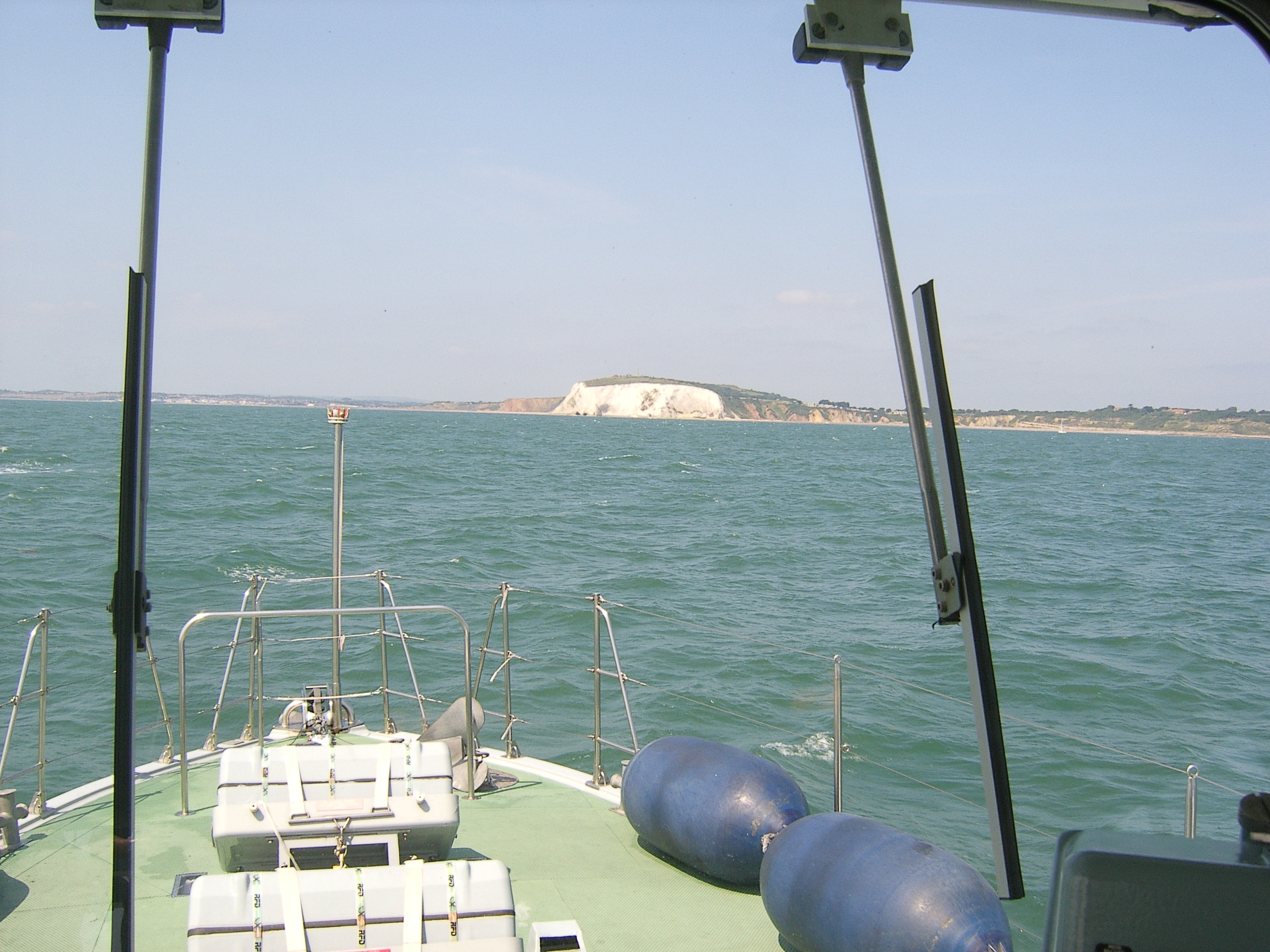
A picture taken from the wheelhouse of HMS Example just before the International Fleet Review.

- RFA Argus
- RFA Fort Victoria
- RFA Orangeleaf
- RFA Wave Ruler
- MV Hurst Point

==== Royal Navy harbour tugs ====
- HMT Helen
- HMT Nimble
- HMT Powerful
- HMT Bustler
- HMT Dexterous

=== Foreign navies ===
==== US ====
- United States Navy
  - USS Saipan
- United States Coast Guard
  - USCGC Eagle

==== European navies ====
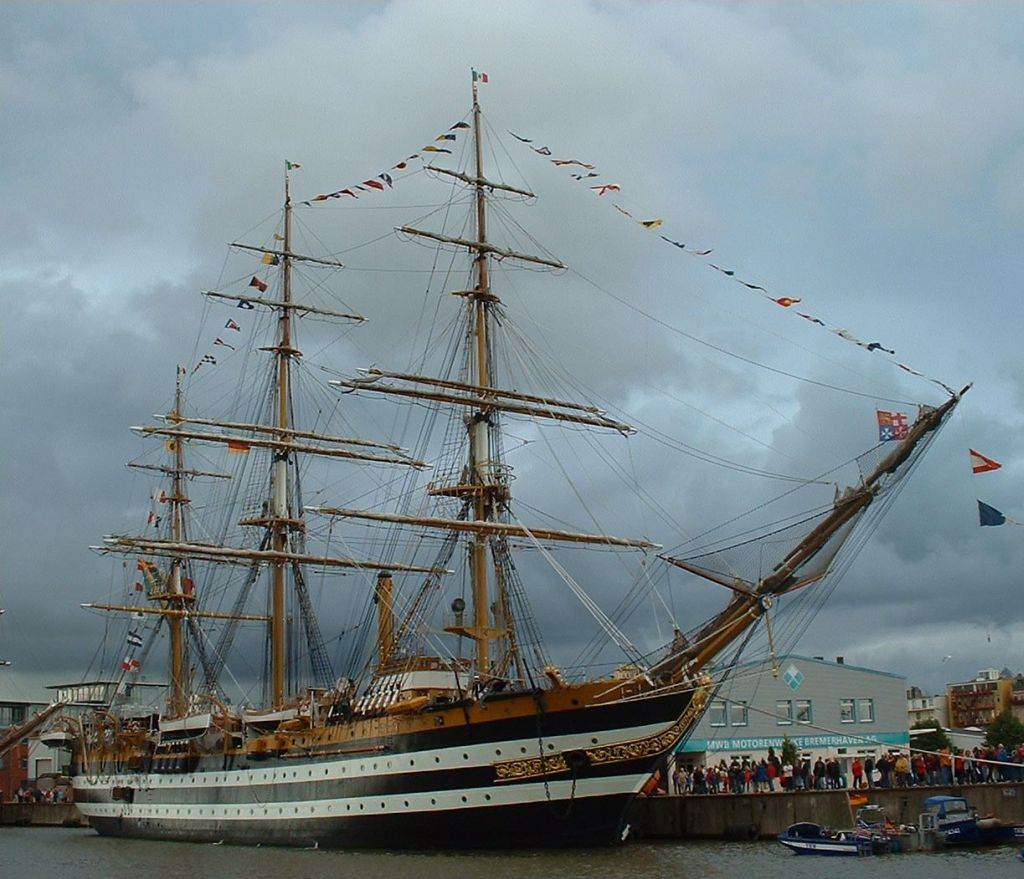
the Italian training ship Amerigo Vespucci

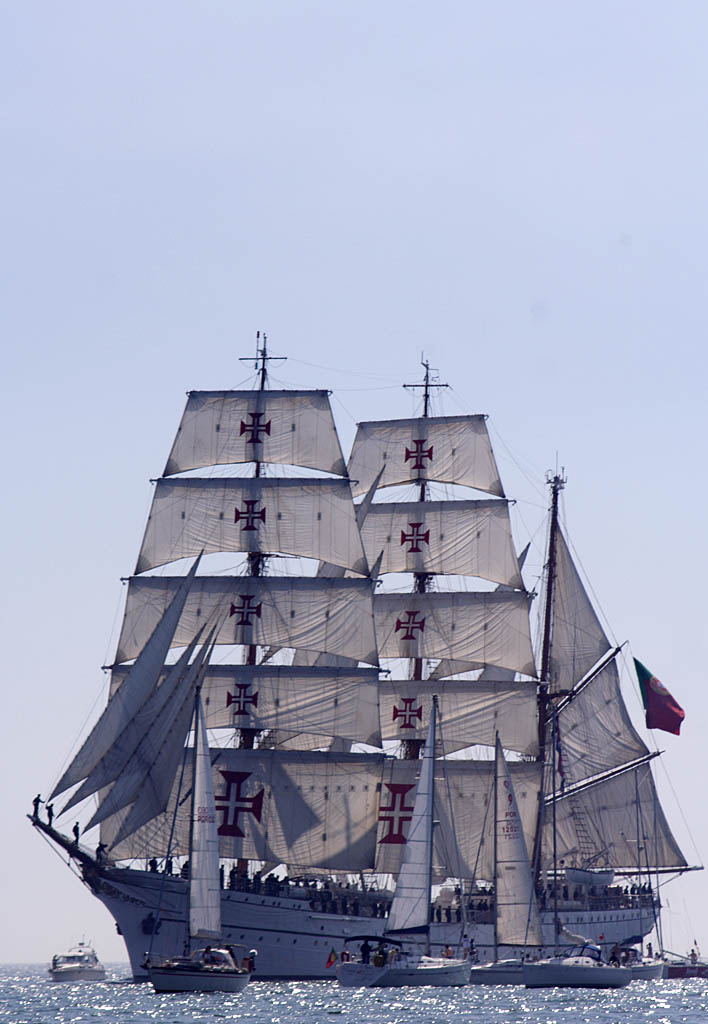
NRP Sagres of the Portuguese Navy

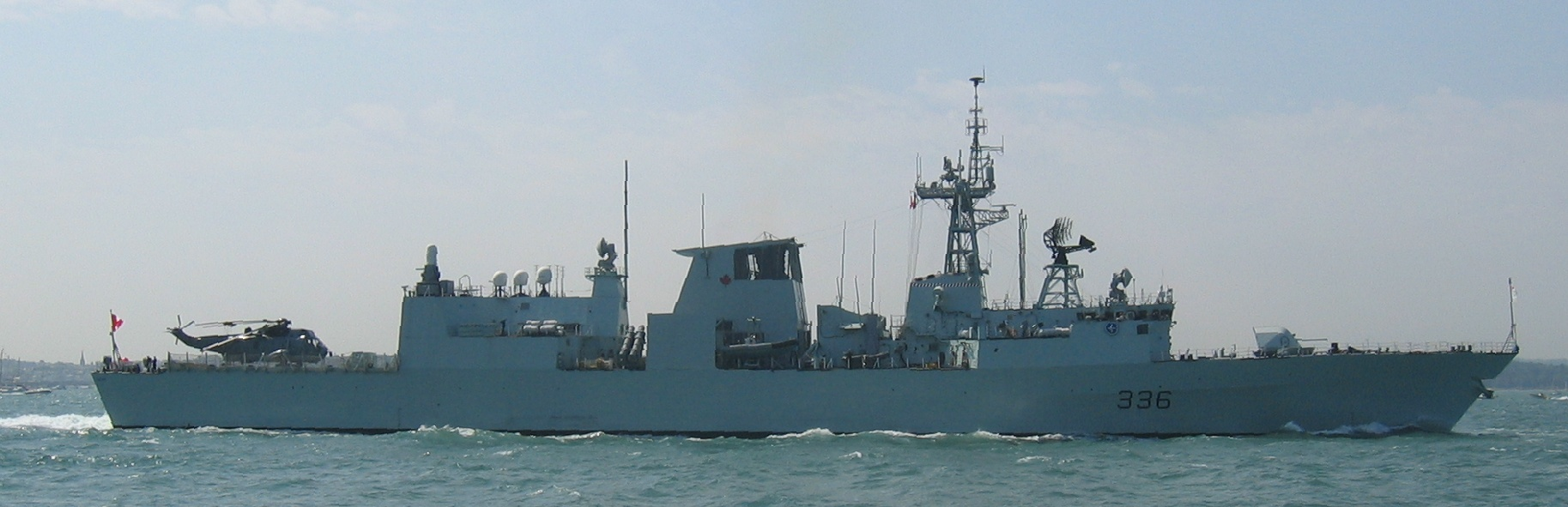
HMCS Montréal at the review

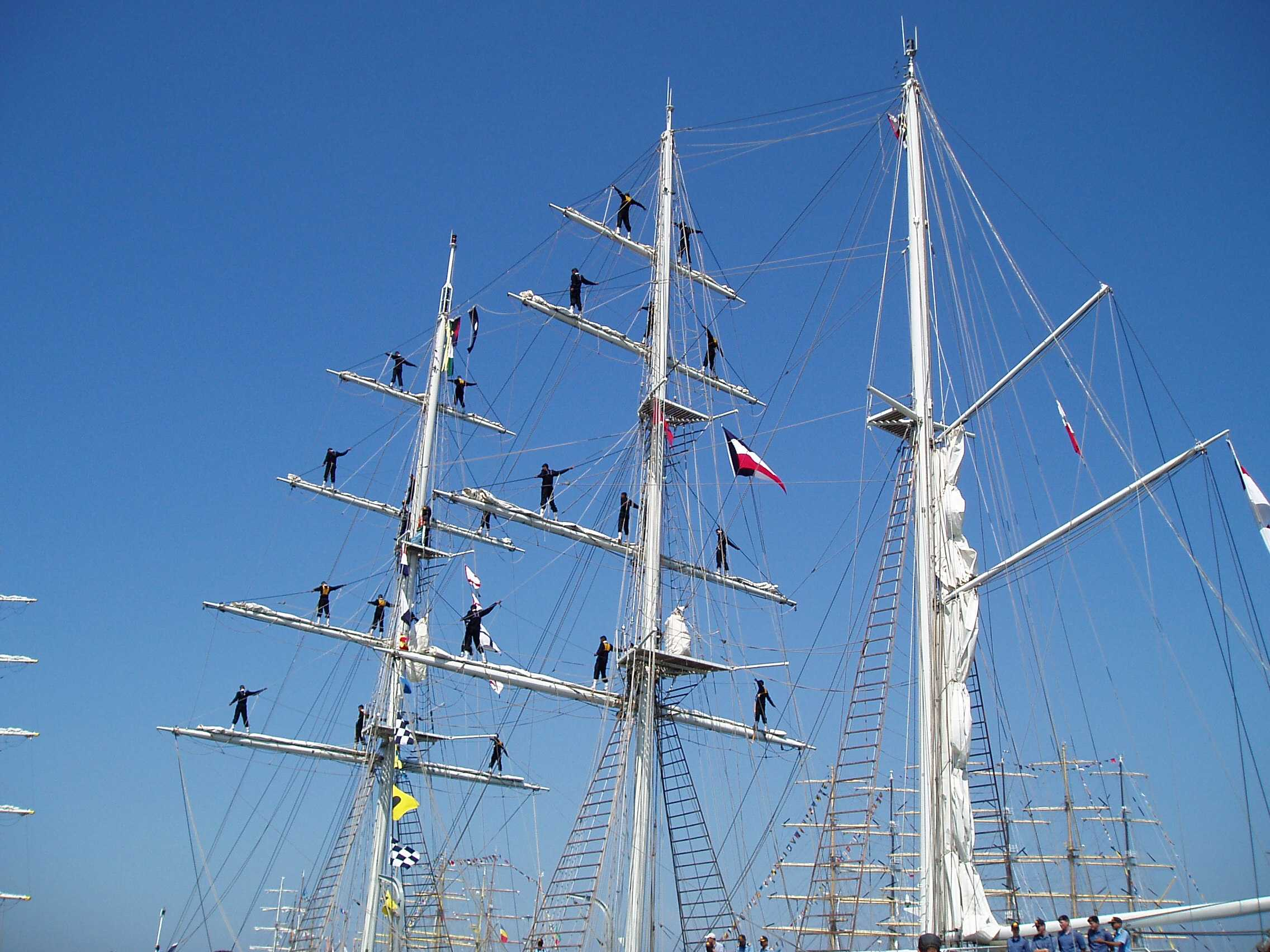
INS Tarangini

- Belgian Navy
  - Narcis
  - Westdiep
  - Godetia
- Royal Netherlands Navy
  - Urk
- French Navy
  - Belle Poule
  - Mutin
  - Meuse
  - Charles de Gaulle
  - Jean Bart
  - Perle
- German Navy - Asta, Sachsen, Dillingen, Frankenthal
- Hellenic Navy - Hydra
- Irish Naval Service - LÉ Eithne
- Italian Navy
  - Amerigo Vespucci
  - Giuliano Prini
- Polish Navy
  - ORP Iskra
  - ORP Generał Tadeusz Kościuszko
- Portuguese Navy
  - NRP Alvares Cabral
  - NRP Sagres
- Romanian Naval Forces - Regina Maria
- Navy of Serbia and Montenegro - Jadran
- Spanish Navy
  - Príncipe de Asturias
  - Blas de Lezo
- Turkish Navy - TCG Oruçreis
- Estonian Navy - EML Admiral Pitka
- Latvian Naval Forces - Versaitis
- Lithuanian Naval Force - LKL Kuršis
- Russian Navy - Admiral Levchenko
- Royal Danish Navy - HDMS Esben Snare
- Finnish Navy - Pohjanmaa

==== African navies ====
- Algerian National Navy - El Kirch
- Nigerian Navy - NNS Aradu
- Royal Moroccan Navy - Mohammed V
- South African Navy - SAS Drakensberg

==== South American navies ====
- Brazilian Navy - Cisne Branco
- Colombian National Navy - ARC Gloria
- National Navy of Uruguay - Capitán Miranda

==== Commonwealth navies ====
- Royal Australian Navy
  - HMAS Anzac
- Royal Canadian Navy
  - HMCS Montréal
- Indian Navy
  - INS Tarangini
  - INS Mumbai
- Pakistan Navy
  - PNS Moawin
  - PNS Tippu Sultan

==== Middle East and Asian navies ====
- Indonesian Navy
  - KRI Dewaruci
- Japan Maritime Self-Defense Force
  - JS Kashima
  - JS Murasame
  - JS Yūgiri
- Royal Navy of Oman - RNOV Shabab Oman, RNOV Al Mua'Zzar
- Republic of Korea Navy - ROKS Chungmugong Yi Sun-sin, ROKS Cheonji

== Non-navy ships ==
=== Training ships and tall ships ===
- Bulgaria - TS Kaliakra
- France - TS La Recouvrance
- Ireland - TS Asgard II
- Netherlands - TS Mercedes, TS Europa
- Norway - TS Sørlandet

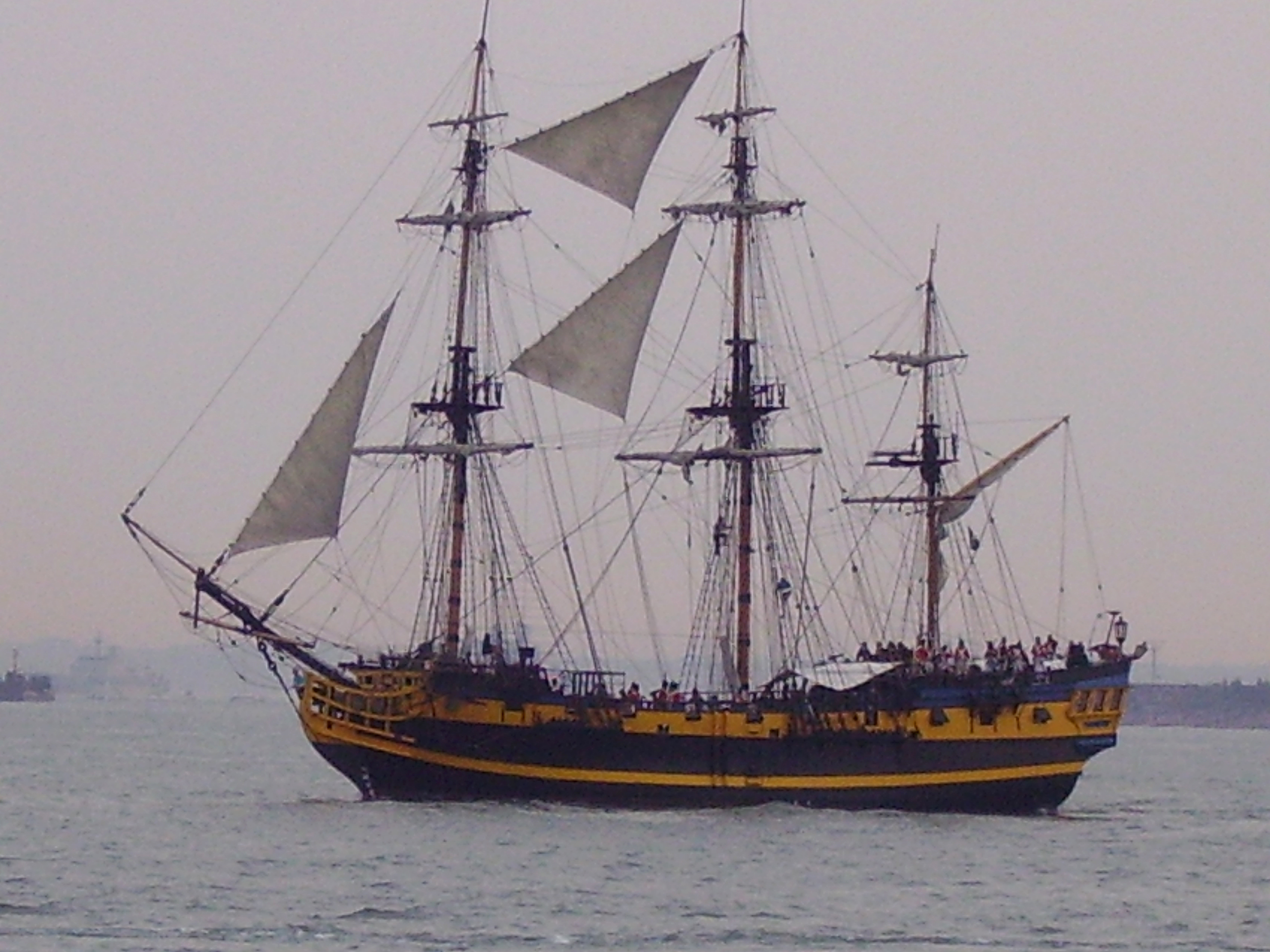
Grand Turk at the Review

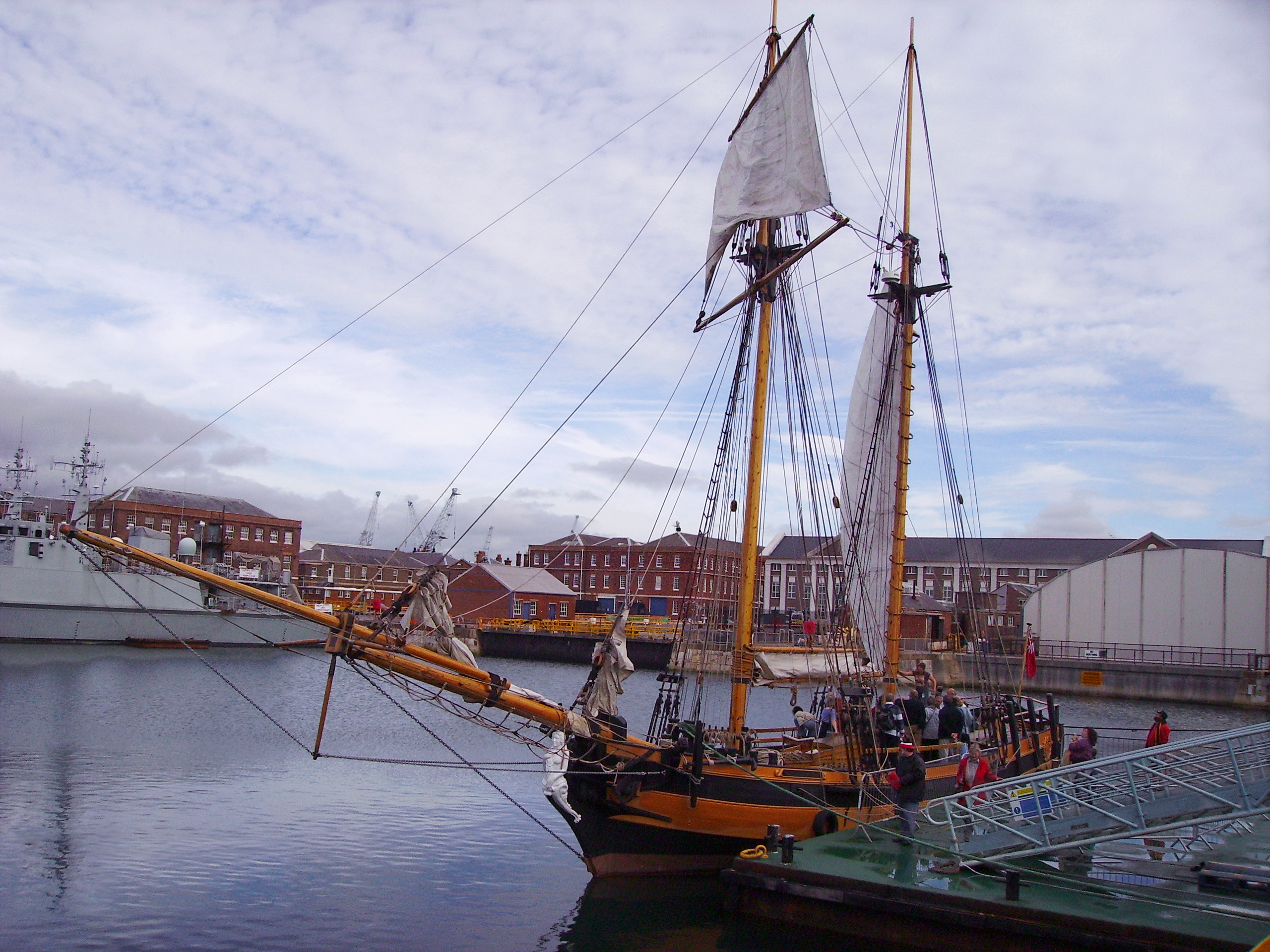
*Sloop Pickle, a reconstruction of HMS Pickle

- Poland - STS Dar Młodziezy, STS Pogoria
- Russia - STS Mir
- US - TS Pride of Baltimore
- UK
  - Grand Turk
  - Sloop Pickle, a reconstruction of HMS Pickle
  - TS Bessie Ellen
  - TS Royalist
  - STS Lord Nelson
  - SV Tenacious
  - TS Prince William
  - TS Matthew
  - Earl of Pembroke
  - Kaskelot
  - TS Phoenix
  - TS Iris
  - TS Will

=== Other ===
MV Balmoral, SS Shieldhall, MV John Jerwood (Sea Cadet offshore training vessel), MV Princess Caroline, MV Sand Harrier, Tug Challenge

==== By company ====
- BP - MV British Merlin
- British Antarctic Survey - RRS James Clark Ross
- Cunard - Queen Elizabeth 2
- HM Customs & Excise - HMCC Valiant
- Global Marine Systems - CS Sovereign
- Sir Donald Gosling - Yacht Leander G
- Guernsey Sea Fisheries - MV Leopardess
- Northern Lighthouse Board - NLV Polestar, NLV Pharos
- Red Funnel - Red Jet 4, Red Eagle
- Royal National Lifeboat Institution - Severn class lifeboat The Duke of Kent (71-45)
- Scottish Fisheries Protection Agency - FPV Norna
- Silversea Cruises - Silver Cloud
- Trinity House - THV Patricia
- Wightlink - MV St Catherine, MV St Clare, MV St Faith, FastCat Ryde, FastCat Shanklin
- Historic ships MTB 102, HMS Medusa
