= THV Patricia =

Trinity House lighthouse tender ship

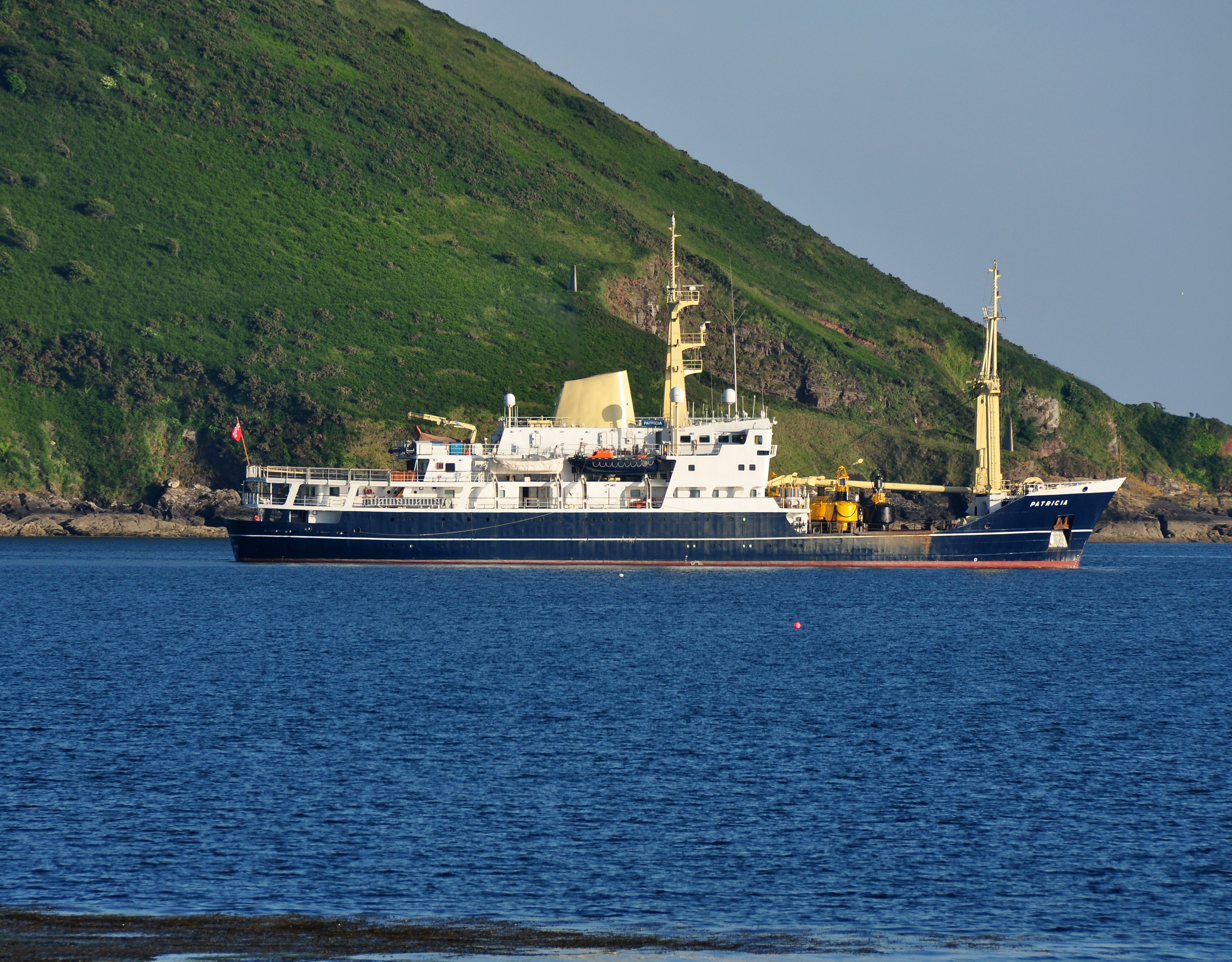
THV Patricia in Jennycliff Bay

THV Patricia is a multi-functional tender (MFT) operated by Trinity House, the body responsible for the operation of lighthouses and marine navigation aids around the coasts of England, Wales and the Channel Islands.

== History ==
The ship was built built by Henry Robb, Leith in 1982. One of her earlier captains was Richard Woodman.

The ship grounded in September 2003 off Norfolk, England. In June 2005, the ship hosted Queen Elizabeth II and led the Royal Squadron at the celebrations of the International Fleet Review 2005.

In 2019, it was announced that the ship would be replaced. In May 2023, the decision to replace the ship with a newer vessel had been postponed and a new procurement process would be considered.

In October 2023, the ship hosted a visit by the National Coastwatch Institution.

== Equipment and operations ==
The ship is 86.3 metres (283 ft 2 in) long and 2,500 tonnes. It carries out maintenance work on navigation aids, as well as towing, hydrographic work, wreck location and marking.

She has a helicopter-landing pad, a 20-tonne main crane and 28-tonne bollard pull and towing winch.

The ship is fitted with side scan hydrographic surveying capability.

The ship has the ability to carry 12 passengers alongside its operational work. However, passenger cruises were suspended in 2020.

== Extrernal links ==
Media related to Patricia (ship, 1982) at Wikimedia Commons

- Current location at MarineTraffic
