= International Festival of the Sea, 2005 =

The International Festival of the Sea was a festival held at H.M. Naval Base, Portsmouth between 30 June and 3 July 2005. It was last in a series of International Festivals of the Sea held in the United Kingdom since 1996, and was also the final part to the long week of festivities that began with the International Fleet Review 2005 off Spithead, Portsmouth on 28 June 2005. The event allowed people to walk around the Naval Base, to go on board all of the visiting vessels, including several vessels belonging to the Royal Navy and also for visitors to walk through the large sheds of the VT Shipbuilding group on site and see the parts of the Type 45 destroyers, HMS Dauntless and HMS Daring being constructed there.

== History ==
The first International Festival of the Sea took place in Bristol in 1996 with the Royal Navy as primary participants. Following the declining numbers of visitors to Portsmouth Navy Day's encouraged the Royal Navy to invite the festival to Portsmouth in 1998, followed again in 2001. Both events were highly successful with over 200,000 visitors to each. This was followed by the 2005 International Festival of the Sea as part of the Trafalgar 200 and Sea Britain 2005 festivities to mark the 200th Anniversary of the Battle of Trafalgar

== Sponsors ==
The main sponsors of the event were the Thales Group and Rolls-Royce, each of which sponsored a specific day out of the four. Thales were sponsors of 30 June as Youth and Education Day, whilst Rolls-Royce sponsored 2 July and the Sea the Future area of the festival. In addition to this, The History Channel sponsored a special Sea History area and Volvo provided vehicles as the official car sponsor for the event.

== See also ==
- Trafalgar 200
- International Fleet Review
- List of ships present at International Fleet Review, 2005
- List of ships present at International Festival of the Sea, 2005
