= PNS Tippu Sultan (D-185) =

Pakistani Navy Tariq-class guided missile destroyer

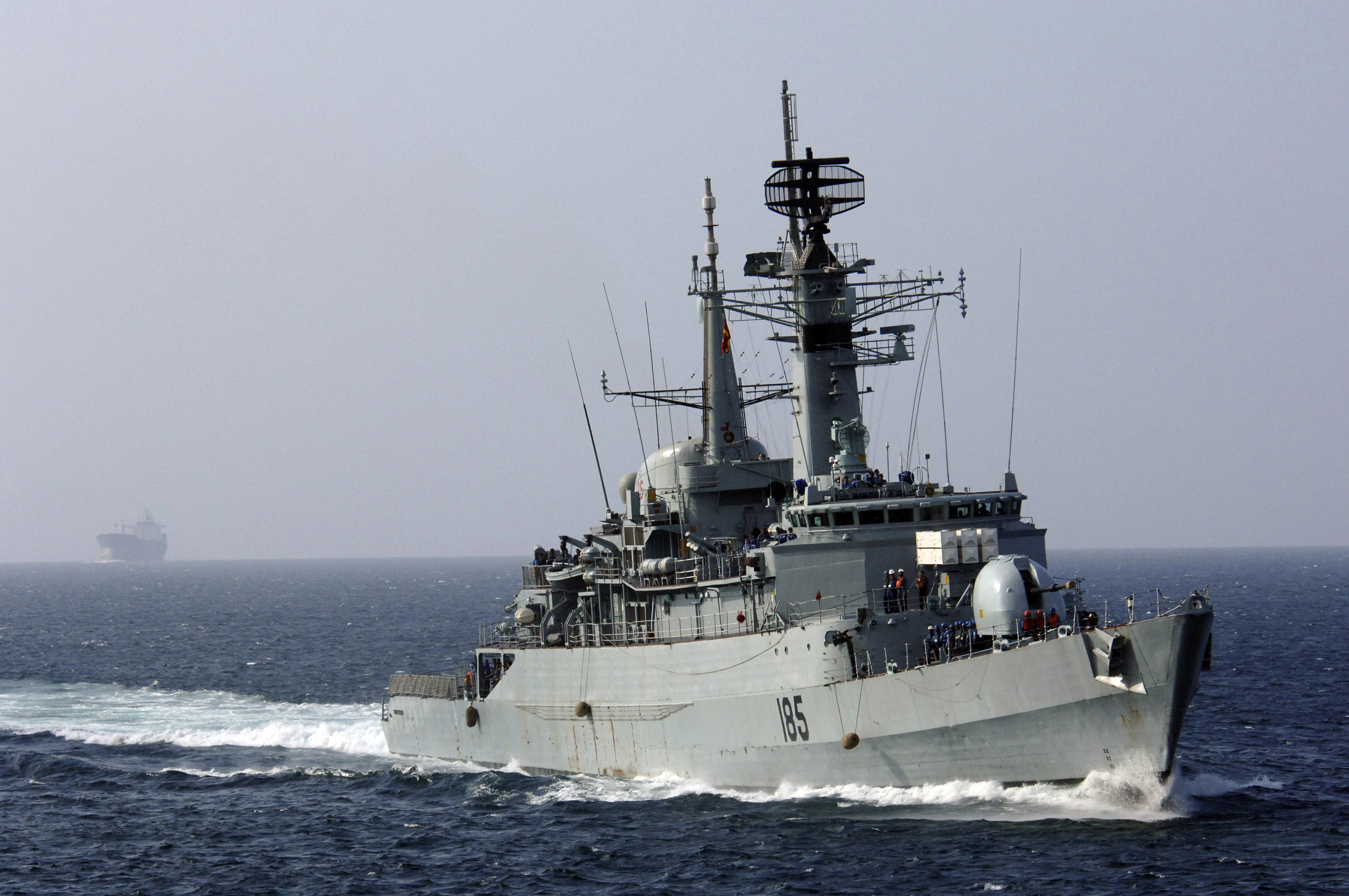
- PNS Tippu Sultan in the Indian Ocean in 2006.

History

Pakistan
- Name: PNS Tippu Sultan
- Namesake: Tipu Sultan
- Builder: Yarrow Shipbuilders in Scotland
- Laid down: 30 October 1974
- Launched: 19 July 1978
- Recommissioned: 23 September 1994
- In service: 1994–2020
- Out of service: 1 April 2020
- Home port: Naval Base Karachi
- Identification: Pennant number: D-185
- Fate: Expended as a target 27 April 2020

General characteristics
- Class & type: Tariq-class frigate
- Displacement: 3,700 long tons (3,759 t) full load
- Length: 384 ft (117 m)
- Beam: 41 ft 9 in (12.73 m)
- Draught: 19 ft 6 in (5.94 m)
- Propulsion: COGOG: 2 × Rolls-Royce Olympus gas turbines; 2 × Rolls-Royce Tyne RM1A gas turbines for cruising
- Speed: 32 knots (59 km/h; 37 mph)
- Range: 4,000 nmi (7,400 km; 4,600 mi) at 17 knots (31 km/h; 20 mph)
- Complement: 192, 14 officers, 178 enlisted
- Armament: 1 × Vickers 4.5 in (114 mm)/55 Mk.8 AS/AA gun (25rds/min to 22 km/11.9nmi); 1 × Phalanx CIWS; 1 × 6-cell LY-60N SAM launcher; 2 × 20 mm Oerlikon cannon
- Aircraft carried: 1 × Alouette III helicopter; 1 × Camcopter S-100 UAV
- Aviation facilities: Flight deck and hangar

PNS Tippu Sultan (DDG-185), a Tariq-class destroyer, served in the Pakistan Navy after it was acquired in 1994. Her design was based on the British Type 21 frigate, and previously served in the Royal Navy as HMS Avenger as a general purpose frigate.

In 1998–2008, the extensive engineering modernization and midlife upgrade program by the Karachi Shipyard & Engineering Works at the Naval Base Karachi reclassified her status as guided missile destroyer.

== Service history ==
=== Acquisition, construction, and modernization ===
She was designed and constructed by the Yarrow Shipbuilders, Glasgow, Scotland, she was laid down on 30 October 1974, and was launched on 19 July 1978. She eventually gained commissioned on 19 July 1978 in the Surface Fleet of the Royal Navy as HMS Avenger. During her service with the Royal Navy, she was notable for her wartime operations during the Falklands War with Argentina.

On 3 October 1994, she was purchased by Pakistan after the successful negotiation with the United Kingdom, along with PNS Shah Jahan.

Upon arriving in Karachi, she underwent an extensive modernization and mid-life upgrade program by Karachi Shipyard & Engineering Works at the Naval Base Karachi in 1998–2002.

She was namesake after Tipu Sultan, a ruler of the Kingdom of Mysore, and was commissioned on 1 March 1994.

Her wartime performance included in deployments in patrolling off the Gulf of Aden, Gulf of Oman, Persian Gulf, Arabian Sea as well as deploying in the Mediterranean Sea when she was part of the multinational CTF-150. On 27 April 2020, the Pakistan military's Inter-Services Public Relations (ISPR) released a military footage showing the Navy conducting a firing exercise that sunk the Tippu Sultan in the Indian Ocean through cruise missile firing launched from a ship and a rotary aircraft.

== Gallery ==
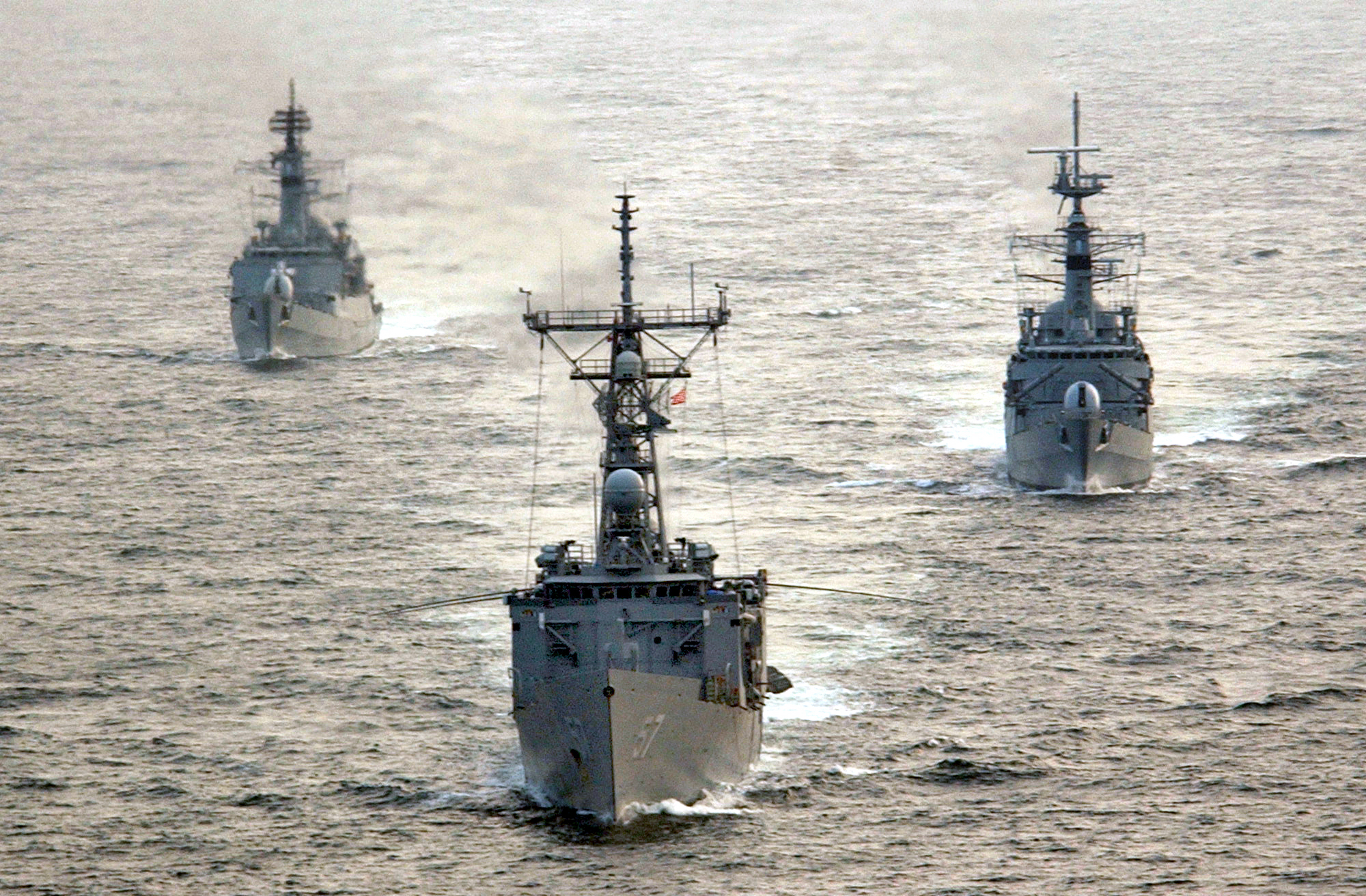
USS Reuben James leads PNS Shahjahan and PNS Tippu Sultan in Exercise Inspired Siren in the Indian Ocean in 2002.

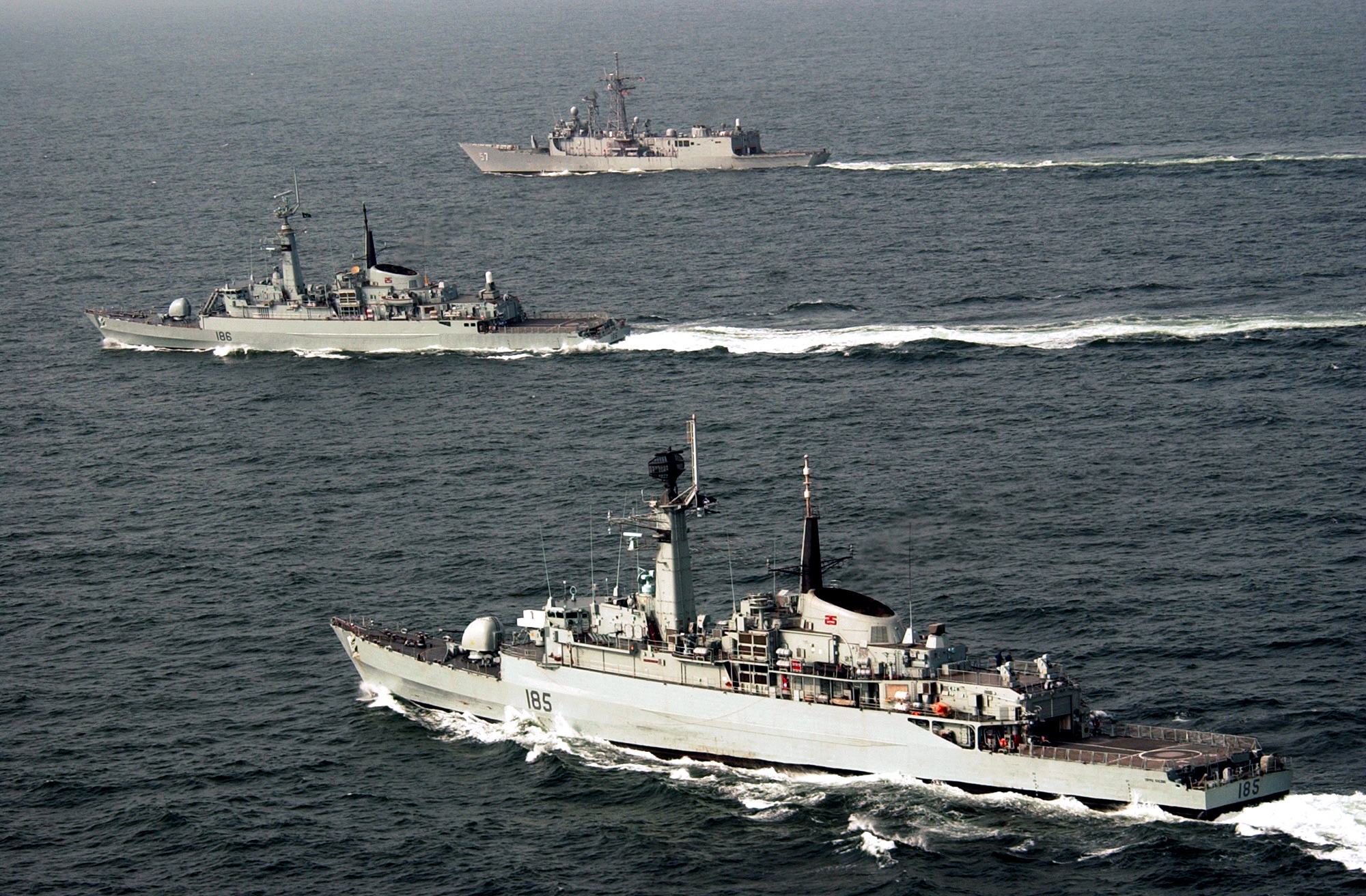
USS Rueben James, PNS Shahjahan and PNS Tippu Sultan in Exercise Inspired Siren in the Indian Ocean in 2002.

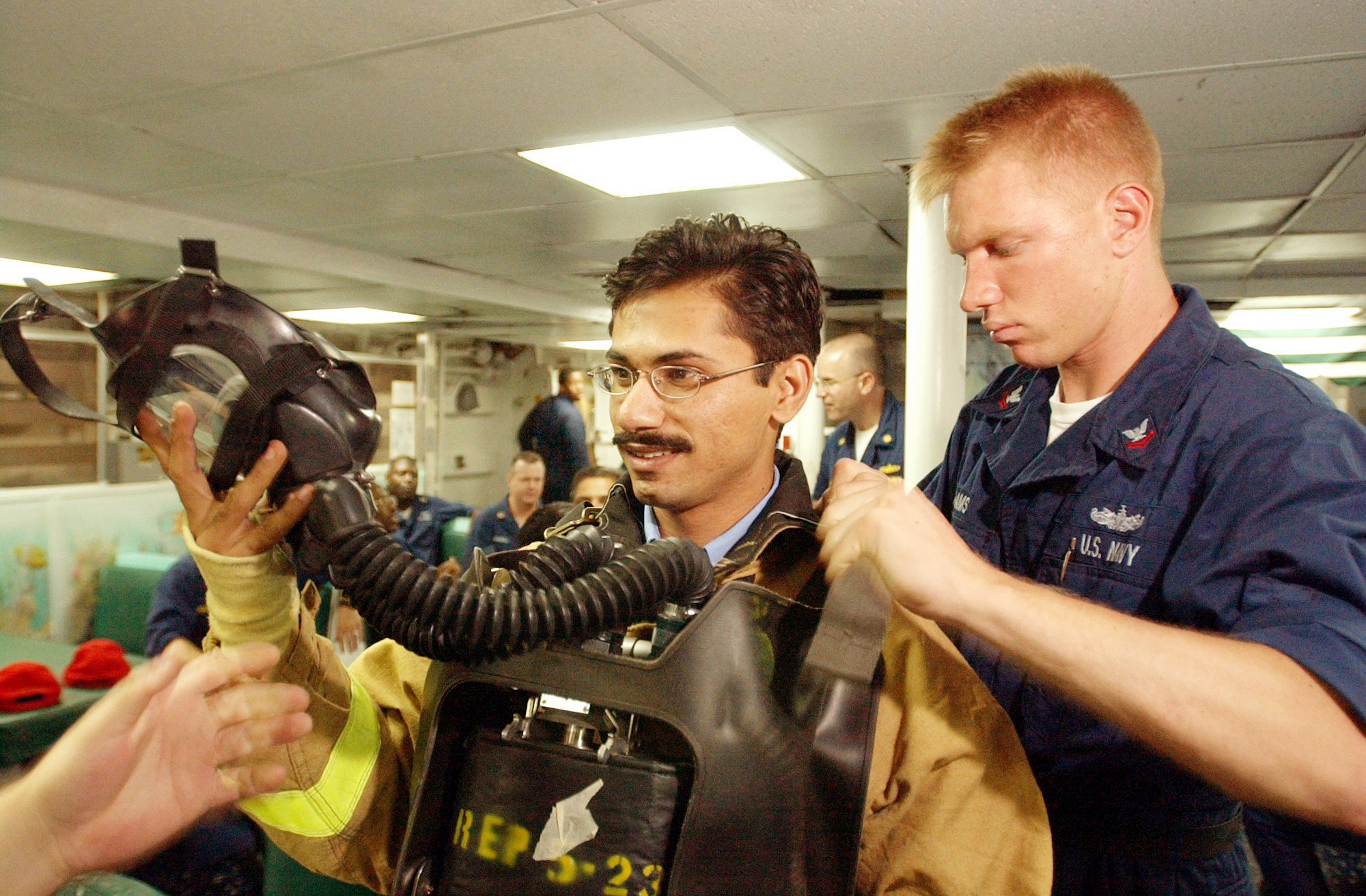
A U.S. Navy PO2 assisting a Pakistan Navy lieutenant with the firefighting gear during the Exercise Inspired Siren in the Indian Ocean in 2002.

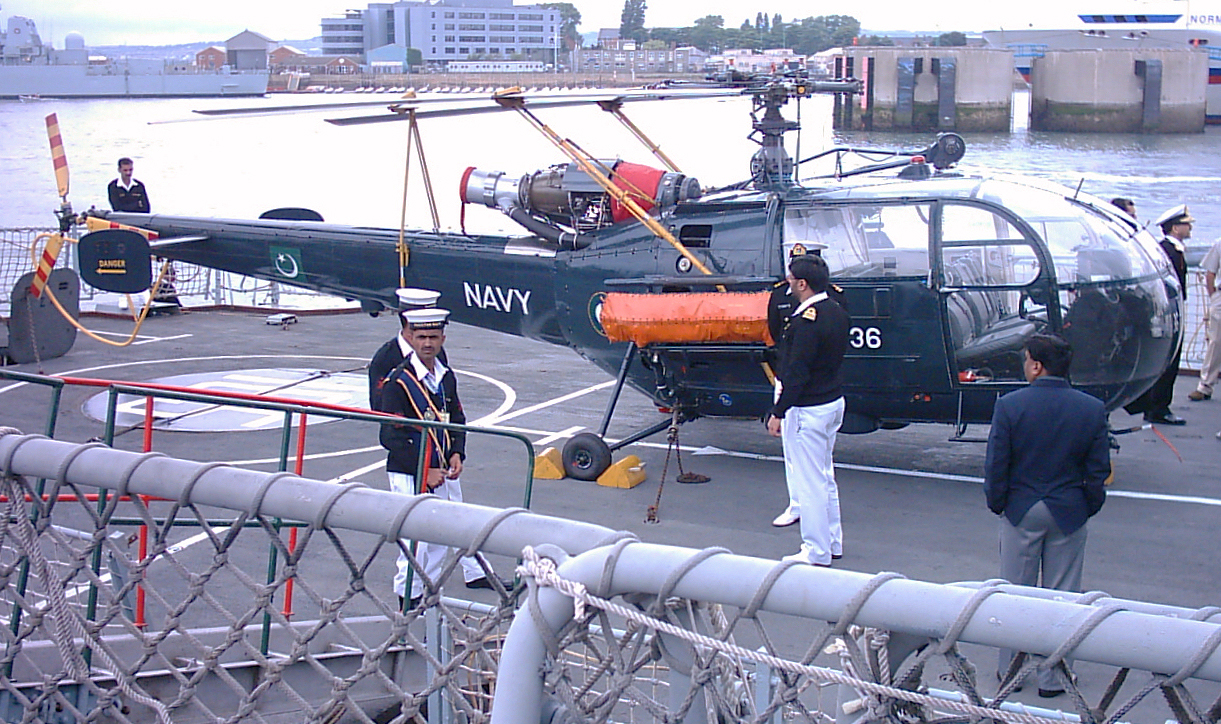
The Pakistan Naval Air Arm Alouette III on the flight deck of PNS Tippu Sultan in International Festival of the Sea in Portsmouth, England in 2005.

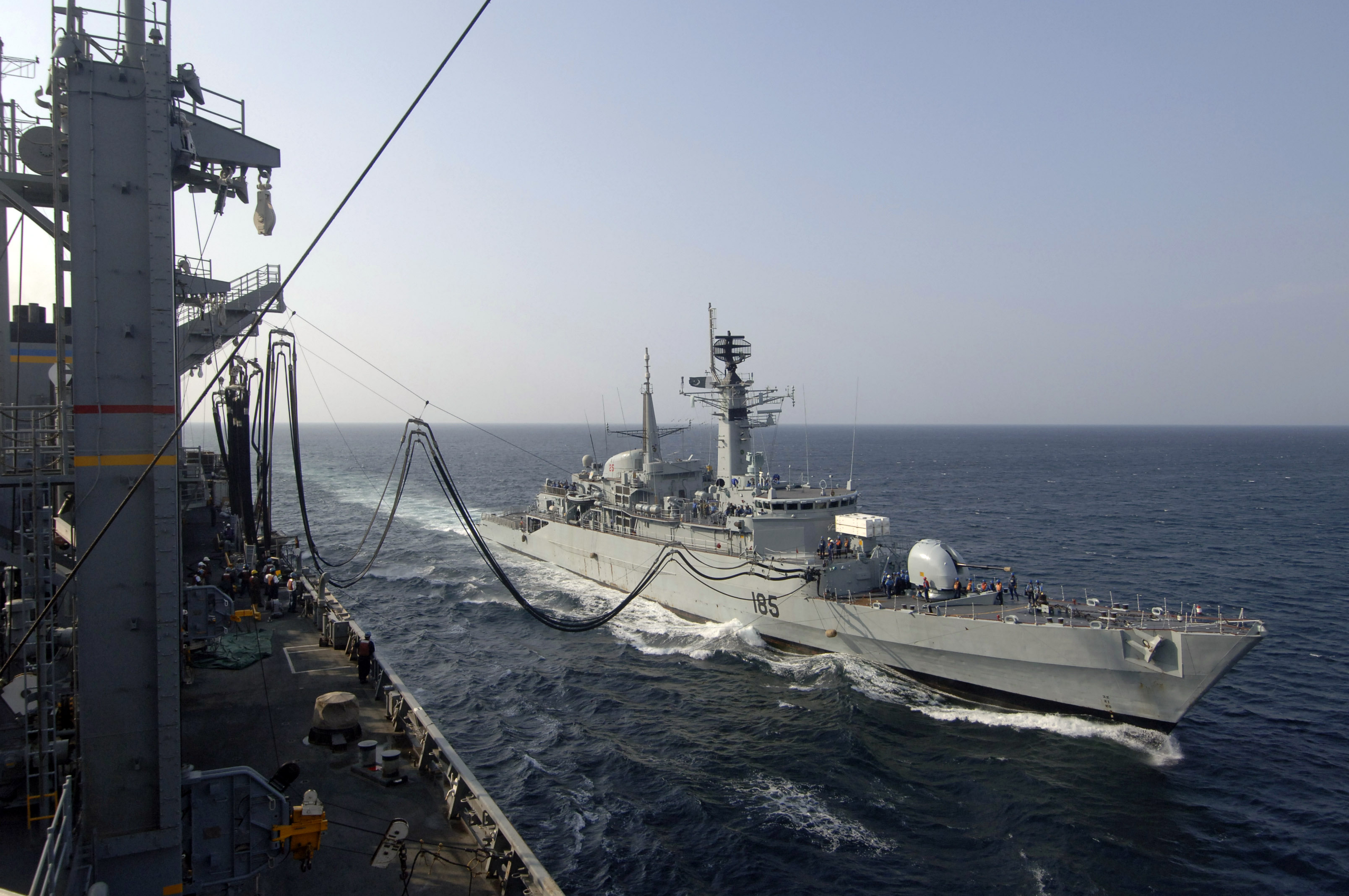
PNS Tippu Sultan receives sea-to-sea refueling from the Military Sealift Command in the Indian Ocean in 2006.

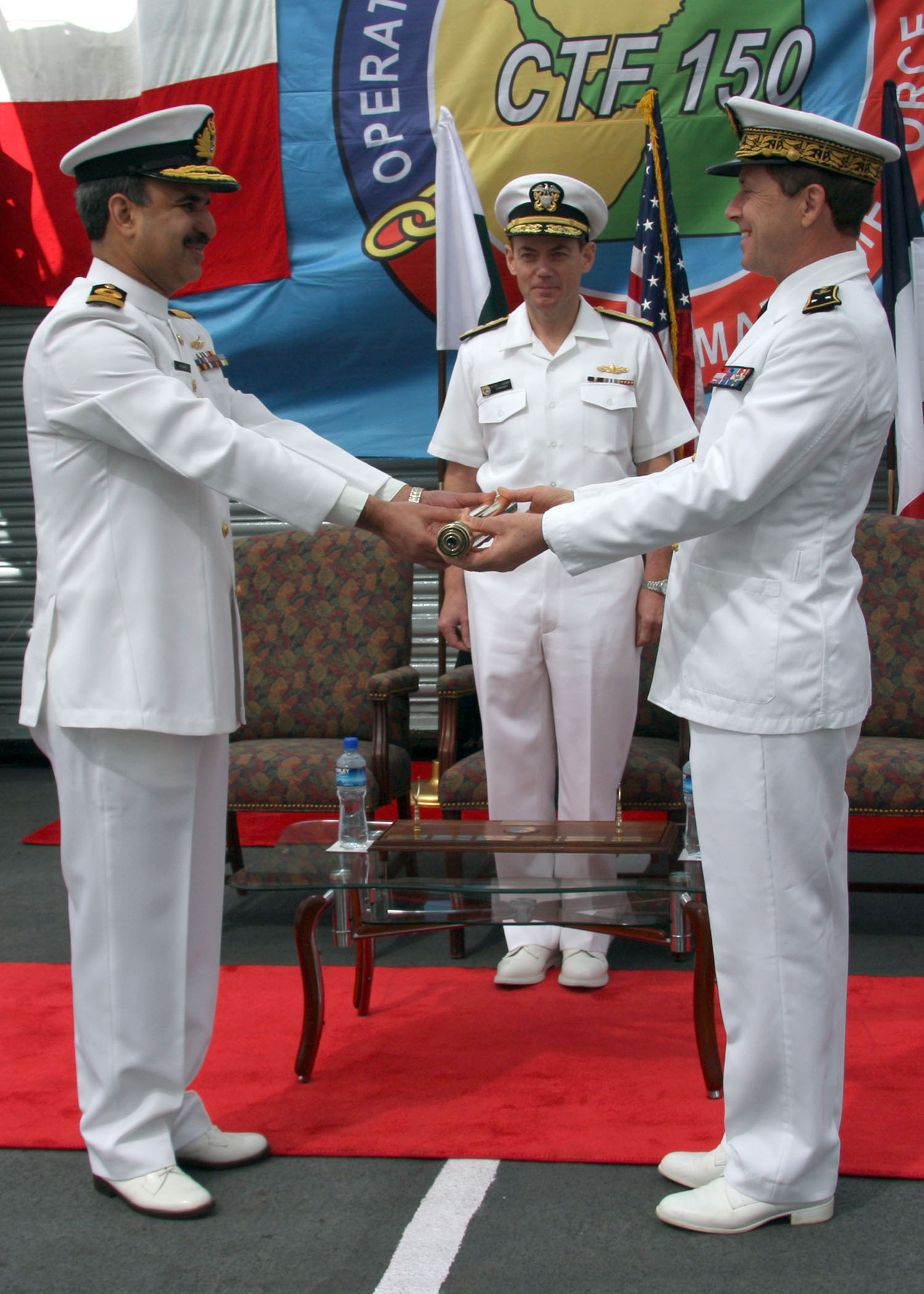
Commodore Hasham bin Saddique taking over the command of CTF-150 from the U.S. Navy at the Tippu Sultan in 2008.

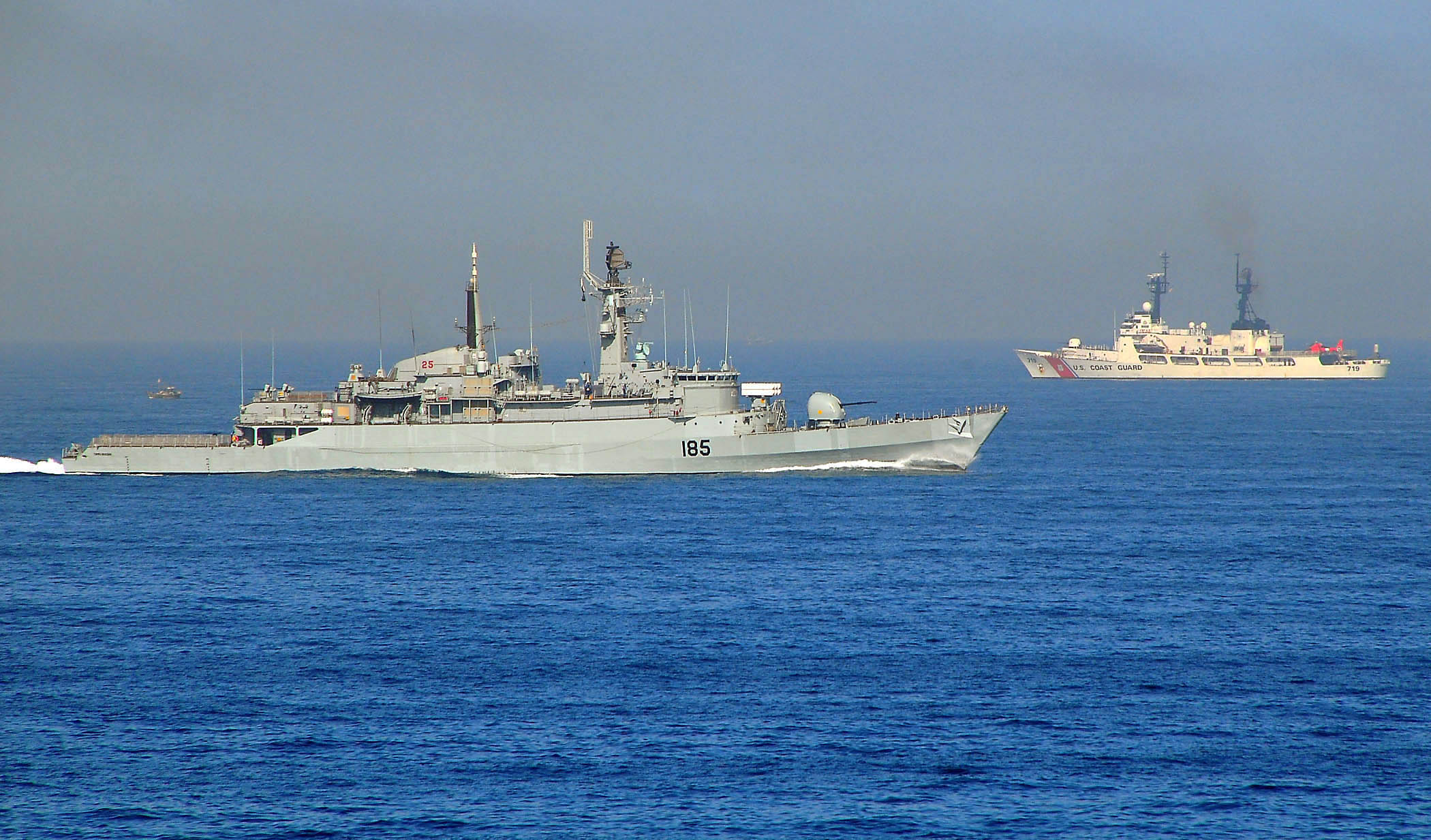
PNS Tippu Sultan participating in Exercise Aman in Indian Ocean with the United States Coast Guard in 2009.

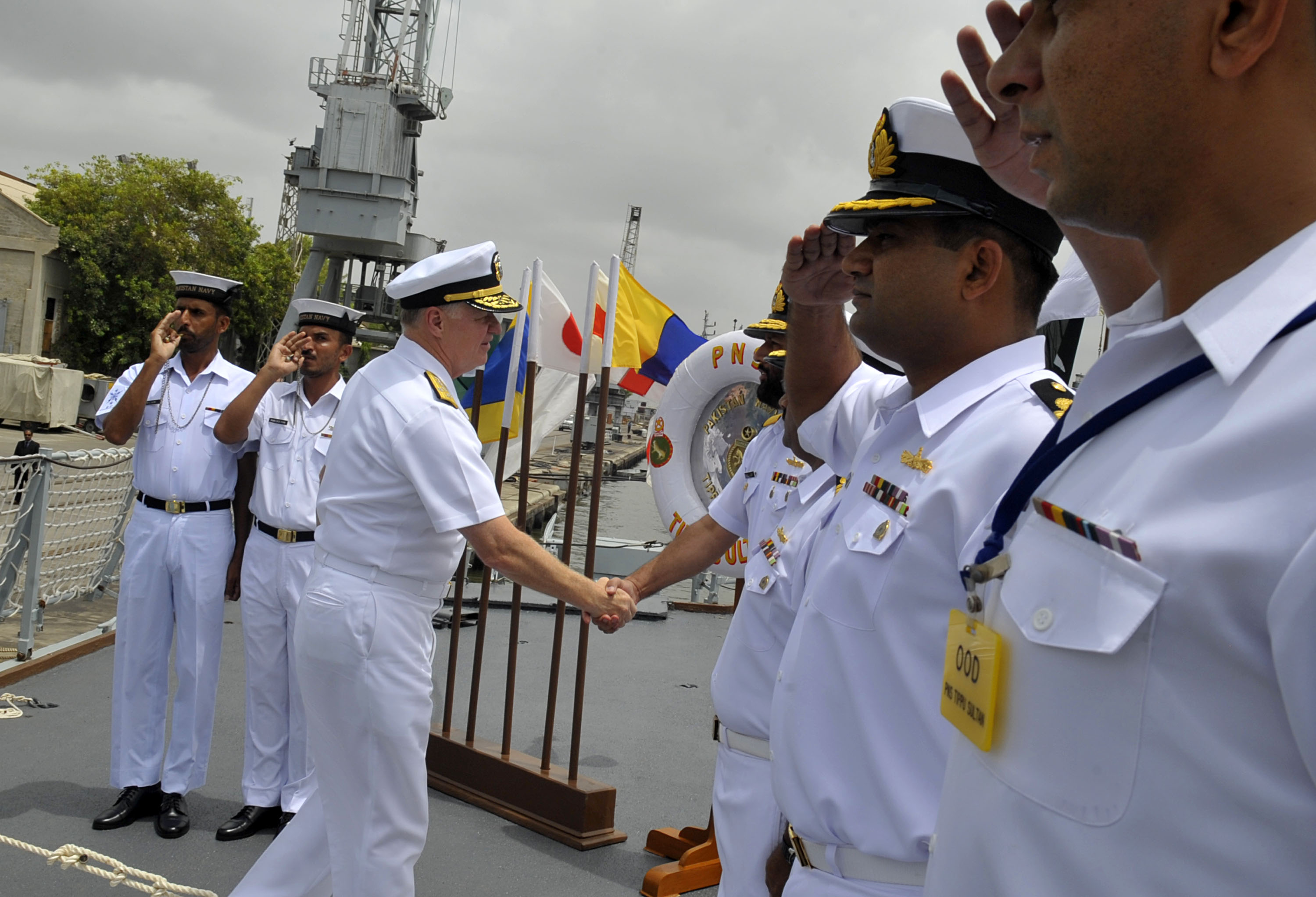
U.S. Chief of Naval Operations, Admiral Gary Roughead, meeting with officers of Tippu Sultan while touring the operations of the guided missile destroyer in 2009.

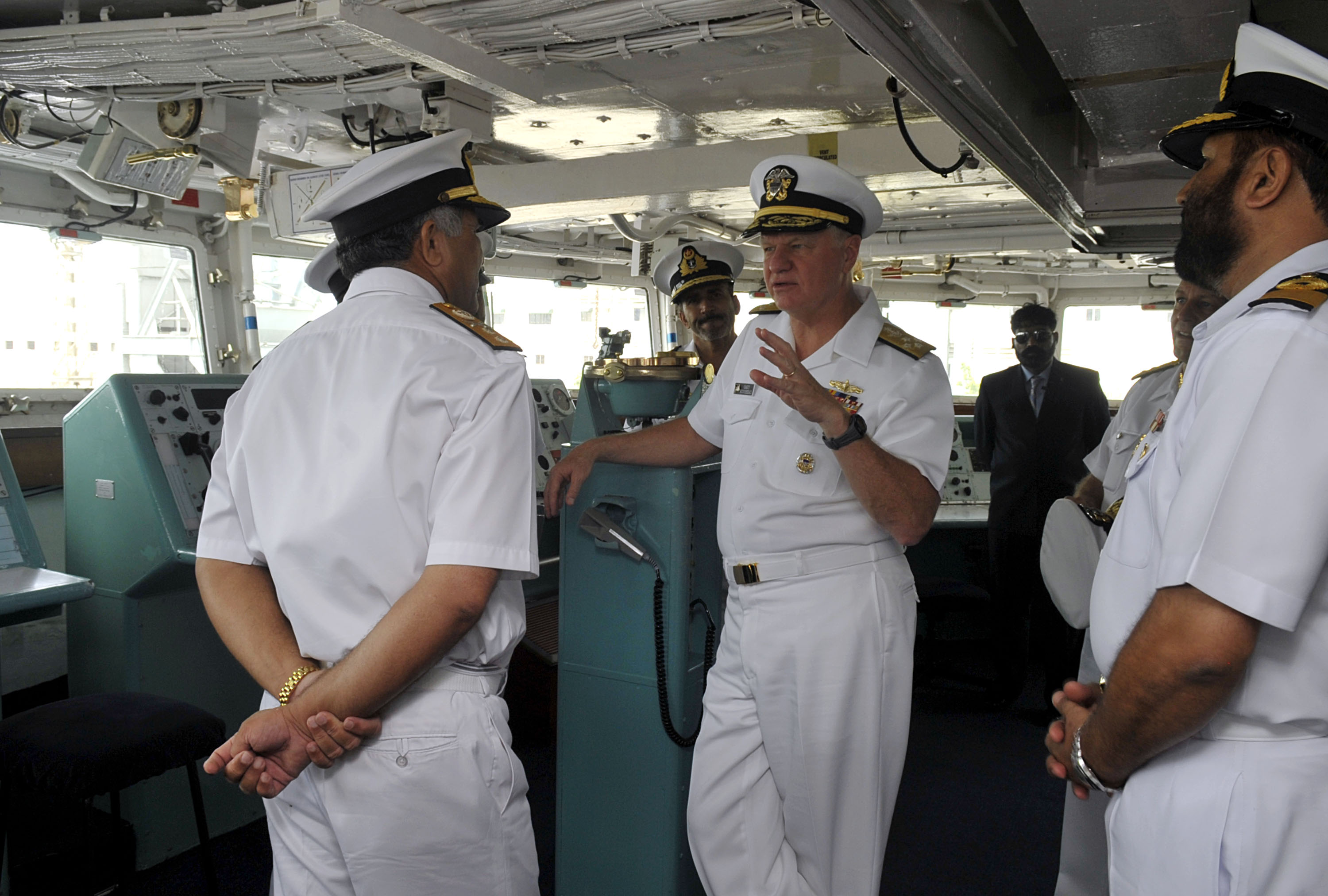
U.S. CNO, Admiral Gary Roughead overseeing the operations of Tippu Sultan in 2009.

== See also ==
- List of ships sunk by missiles
