= HMS Walney (M104) =

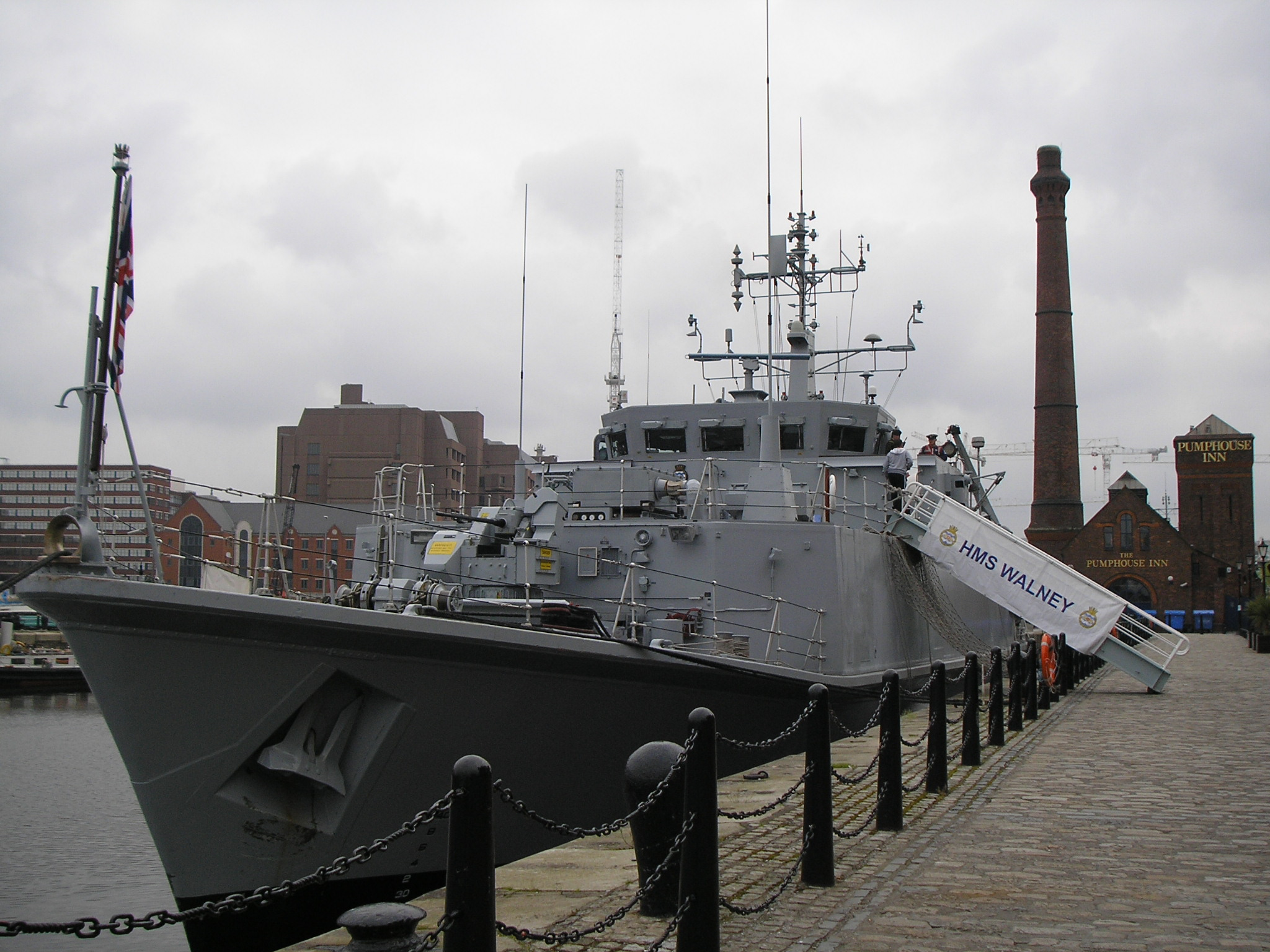
- HMS Walney docked at Liverpool in May 2006

History

United Kingdom
- Name: Walney
- Builder: Vosper Thornycroft
- Launched: 25 November 1991
- Commissioned: 19 February 1993
- Decommissioned: 15 October 2010
- Home port: HMNB Clyde
- Identification: Pennant number: M104; IMO number: 4906733; MMSI number: 234640000; Callsign: GACT
- Status: Awaiting disposal

General characteristics
- Class & type: Sandown-class minehunter
- Displacement: 600 tonnes
- Length: 52.5 m (172.2 ft)
- Beam: 10.9 m (35.8 ft)
- Draught: 2.3 m (7.5 ft)
- Propulsion: 2 shafts Voith-Schneider propulsors; diesel-electric drive; Paxman Valenta diesels, 1,500 shp (1,100 kW)
- Speed: 13 knots (24 km/h; 15 mph) diesel; 6.5 knots (12.0 km/h; 7.5 mph) electric
- Complement: 34 (7 officers, 27 ratings)
- Sensors & processing systems: Type 1007 navigation radar; Type 2093 variable-depth mine hunting sonar
- Armament: 1 × Oerlikon 30 mm KCB gun on DS-30B mount; 2 × 7.62 mm L7 GPMG machine guns; Wallop Defence Systems Barricade Mk. III countermeasure launchers; Irvin Aerospace Replica Decoy launchers
- Notes: Mine Counter-Measures Equipment: SeaFox mine disposal system; Clearance divers

HMS Walney (M104) was a Sandown-class minehunter of the British Royal Navy. She was the fourth of the Sandown-class minehunters, and the second ship to carry the name, which comes from the island off Barrow-in-Furness in Cumbria on the north-west coast of England.

== Construction and design ==
HMS Walney was one of four Sandown-class minehunters ordered from Vosper Thornycroft on 27 July 1987. She was laid down at Vosper Thoneycroft's Woolston, Southampton shipyard in May 1990, launched on 25 November 1991 and commissioned on 20 February 1993.

== Operational history ==
On 15 May 2006, HMS Walney and HMS Atherstone discovered a 1,000 lb (450 kg) World War II bomb whilst conducting a survey of the River Mersey.

== Decommissioning and final fate ==
It was announced on 16 December 2009 that Walney would be decommissioned sometime in 2010. She was decommissioned in a ceremony on 15 October 2010 at her homeport, HMNB Clyde. Walney called in at her affiliated town of Barrow-in-Furness on her way to her final port of call, Portsmouth Naval Base where she remains laid up in 3 Basin. In 2014 the ship was listed for sale via the Disposal Services Authority.

As of 2025 HMS Walney failed to attract any bids when being auctioned off for scrapping, and the final fate of the ship was thus uncertain. She remained at Portsmouth Naval Base.

== Affiliates ==
- Barrow-in-Furness
- The casualty department at Furness General Hospital
- TS Quantock, Sea Cadet Corps in Ashton-under-Lyne
