= International Fleet Review 2005 =

Most recent Royal Navy ship review

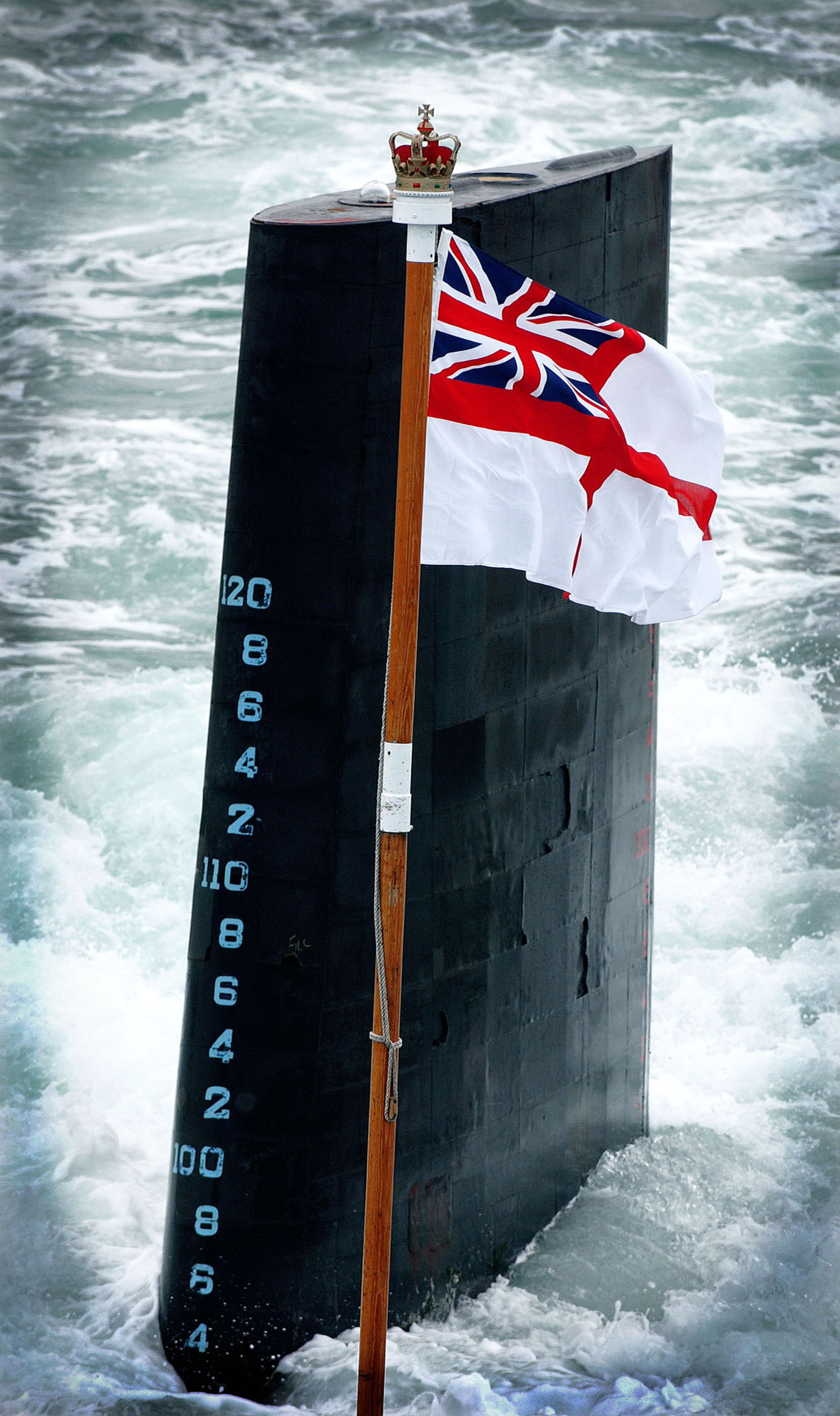
- HMS Trafalgar, a Trafalgar-class attack submarine, on transit to the fleet review in Portsmouth Dockyard, part of the Trafalgar 200
- Date: 2 June 2005
- Also known as: IFR 2005
- Type: Military

The International Fleet Review was the most recent Royal Navy review, continuing a tradition going back to the 15th century. It took place on 28 June 2005, as part of the Trafalgar 200 celebrations to commemorate the 200th anniversary of the Battle of Trafalgar in 1805. For the celebrations to mark Her Majesty's Diamond Jubilee in 2012, instead of a Fleet Review such as marked that of Queen Victoria, there was a cavalcade of boats down the Thames.

== 2005 Review Line-up ==
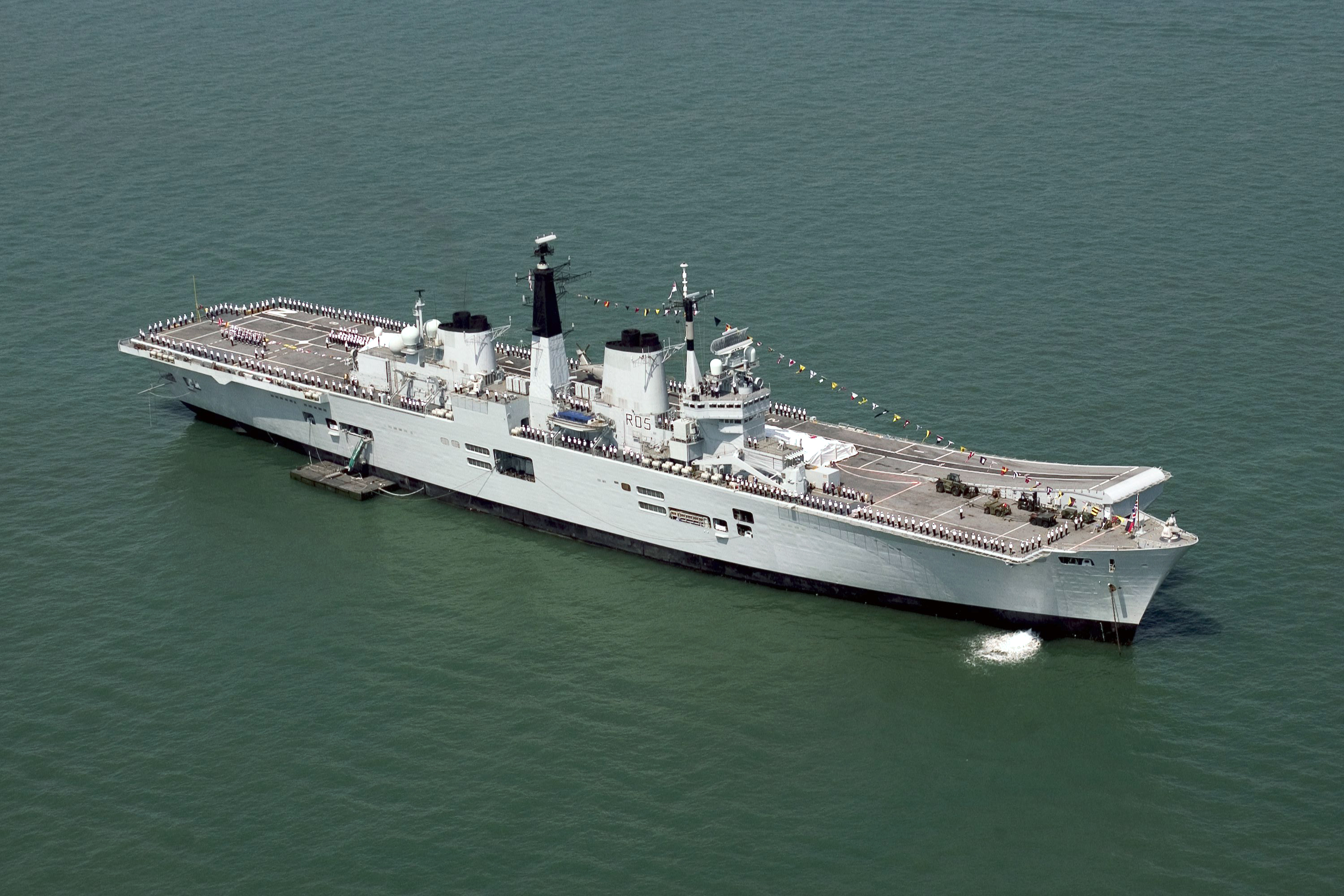
HMS Invincible In the Solent ready for the International Fleet Review, 2005.

During the afternoon of 28 June 2005, Queen Elizabeth II, as Lord High Admiral of the United Kingdom, embarked on board HMS Endurance. Led by THV Patricia, and with HMS Chatham following as "Sovereign's Escort", Her Majesty set sail to review a fleet of over 167 ships of the Royal Navy and of over 30 other nations, as well as other non-naval vessels such as the passenger liner Queen Elizabeth 2. The previous fleet review by the Queen in the United Kingdom was in 1999 for the commemoration of the anniversary of the Battle of the Atlantic.

The review took place at Spithead, on the Solent, between Portsmouth and the Isle of Wight, in England. The Fleet Review is a 600-year-old British tradition, and until the 2005 review consisted of mainly Royal Navy ships, with a small number of invited foreign ships, but there are today no longer enough Royal Navy warships available in home waters for this to be worthwhile. This review, therefore, went with the modern trend of inviting foreign warships too, and was the largest on record in terms of nations attending and of number of ships - 167 naval and merchant ships attended, including 57 British warships.

The Queen reviewed the fleet from on board the Royal Navy's Antarctic Patrol Vessel HMS Endurance. Huge crowds gathered along Southsea Common and Gosport Sea Front, to witness the largest gathering of naval vessels in the Solent since the Queen's Silver Jubilee Fleet Review in 1977.

The crowd was entertained by aerobatic and flying displays, including an appearance by a Spitfire, helicopter aerobatics and a special performance by the Red Arrows. While the weather had been very wet, the clouds appeared to clear in time for each display.

At the end of the day's festivities, centered on the review, a massive firework display was held as a 'reconstruction' of the Battle of Trafalgar (with Grand Turk standing in for HMS Victory, and with a red and a blue side rather than French and British ones), now known to be one of the largest firework displays in recorded history.

== Events of the day ==
- Fleet Review by the Queen: 1300-1500
- Steam past, Tall ships sail past, Small craft sail past and flypast of international maritime aircraft: 1500-1645
- Air displays: 1700
- Nelson's Walk from Southsea Common and embarkation to Grand Turk: 2000
- Son et lumière: 2100-2230
- Fireworks display: 2210-2225
- Fleet Lighting: 2230

== Images from the day ==
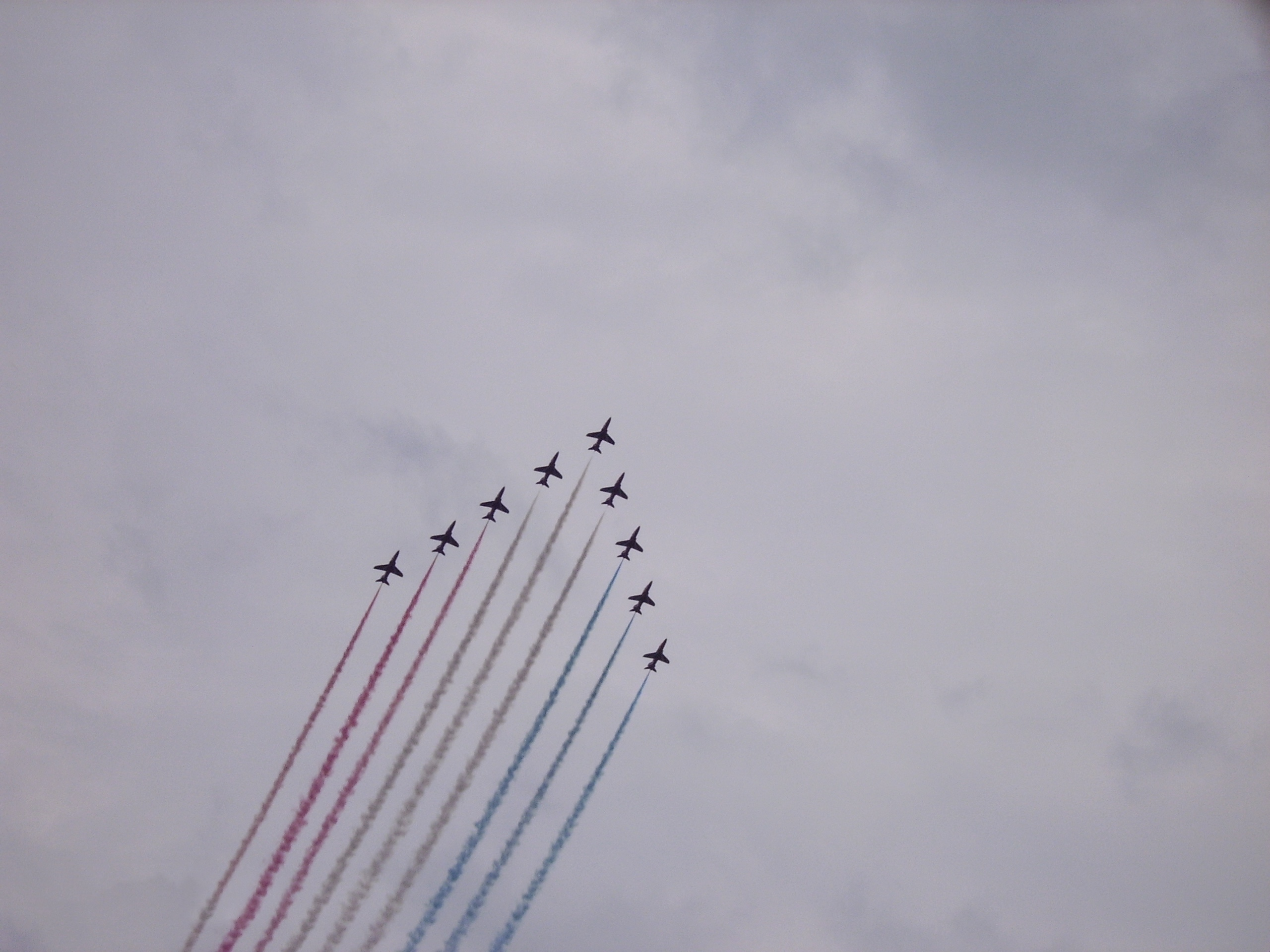
Red, white & blue trails - The Red Arrows

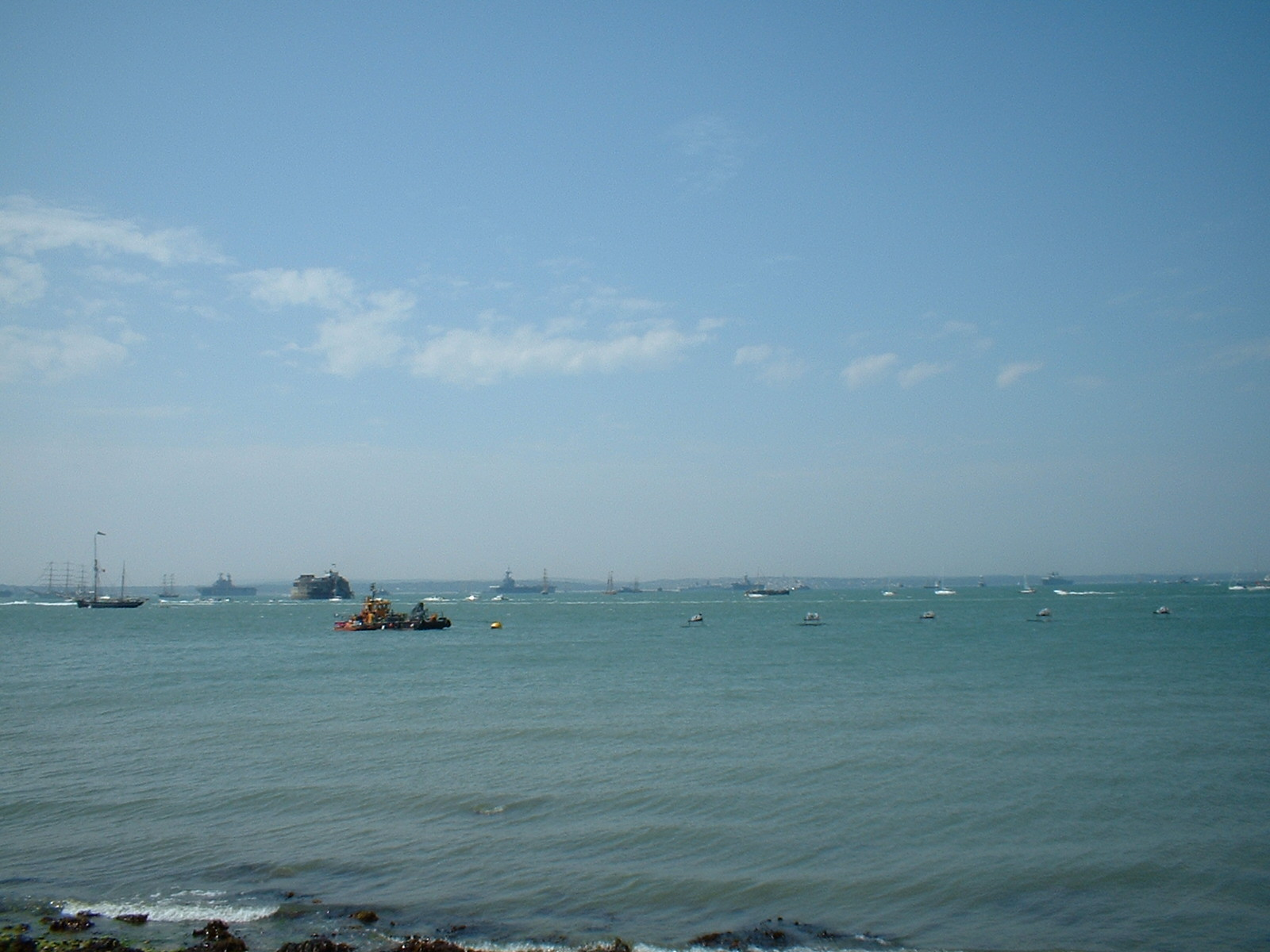
The aircraft carriers assembled at the Review

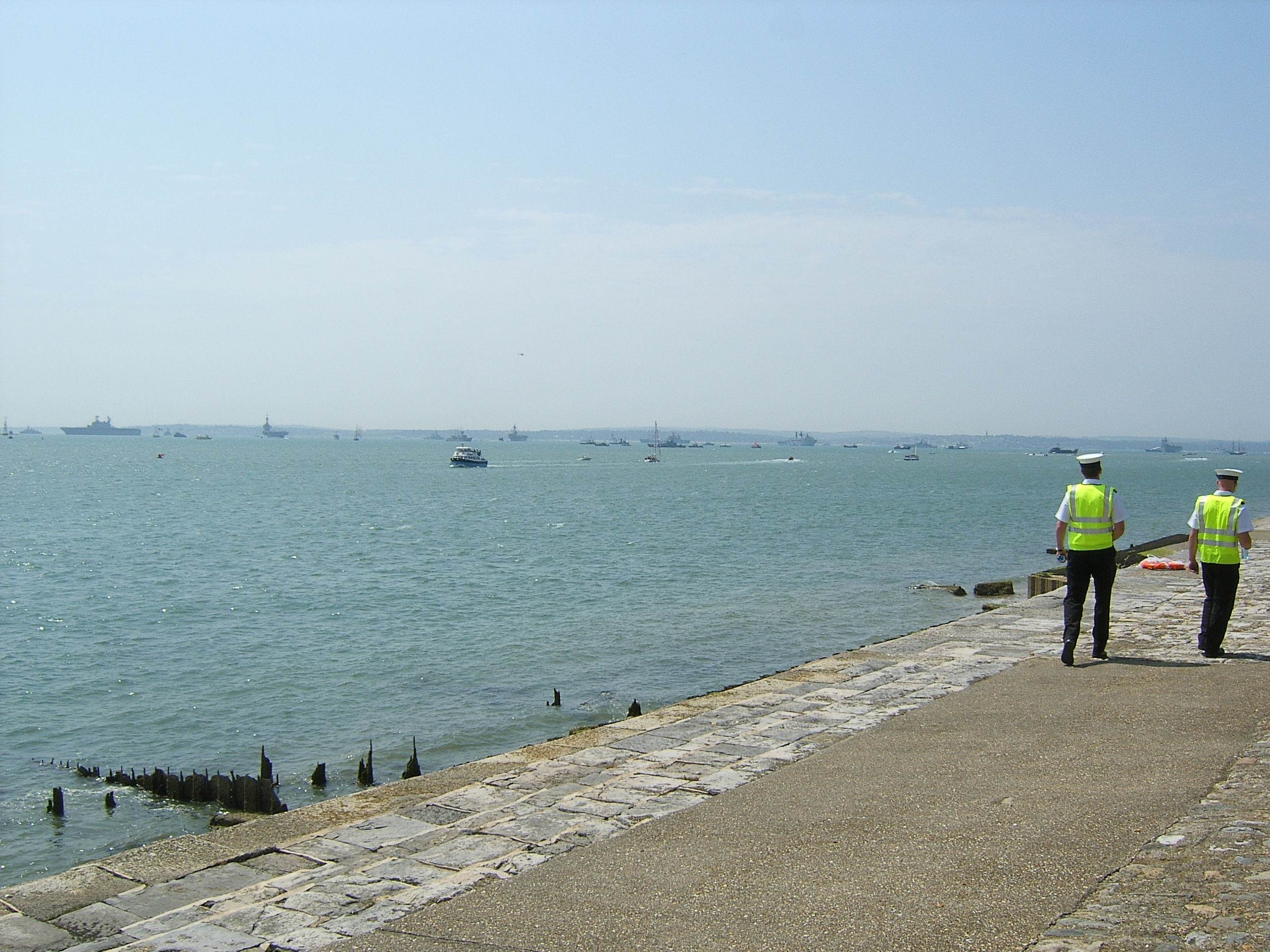
Ships at the International Fleet Review as seen from Fort Blockhouse in Gosport, Hampshire

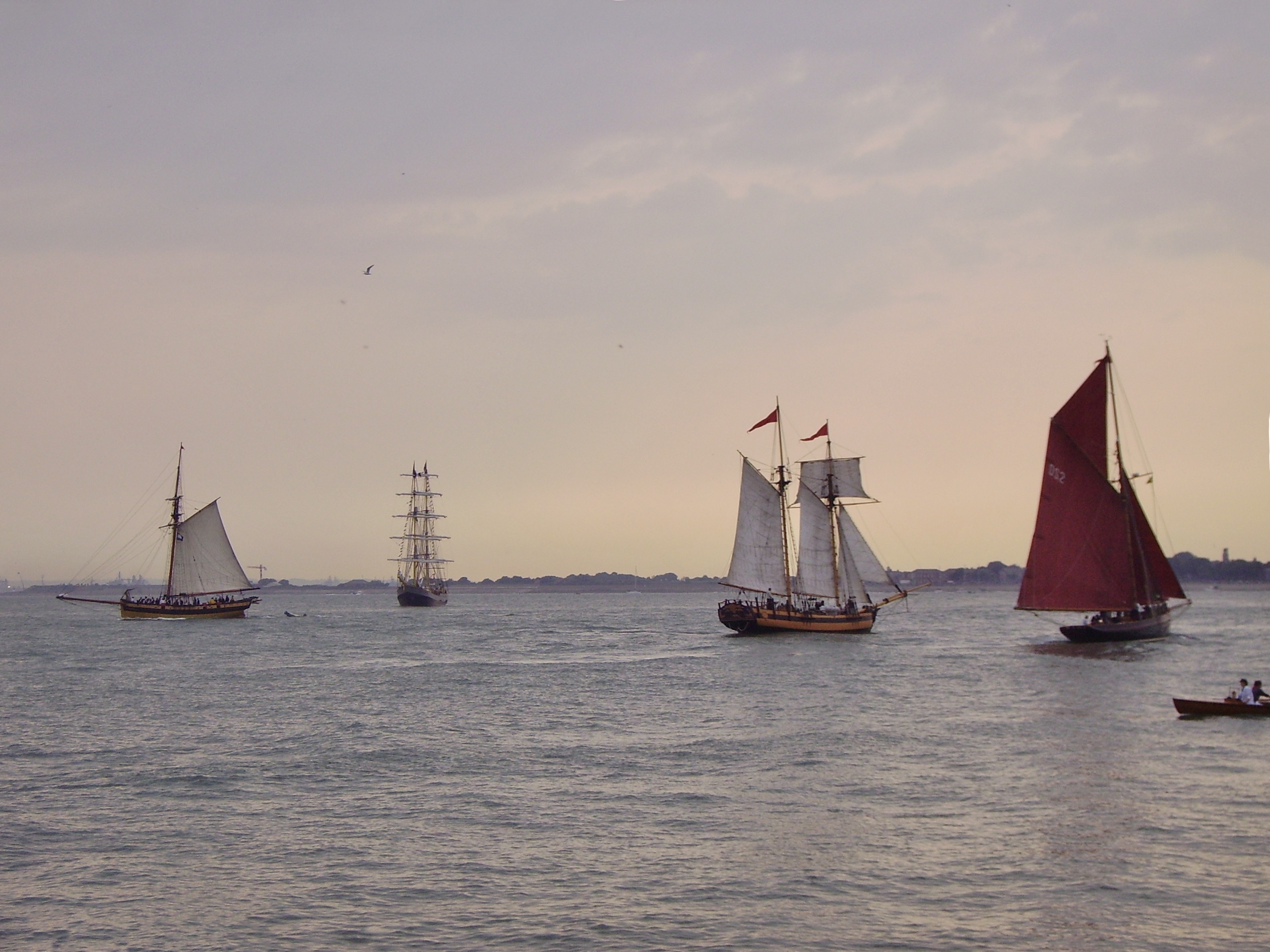
Some of the 'battle' participants

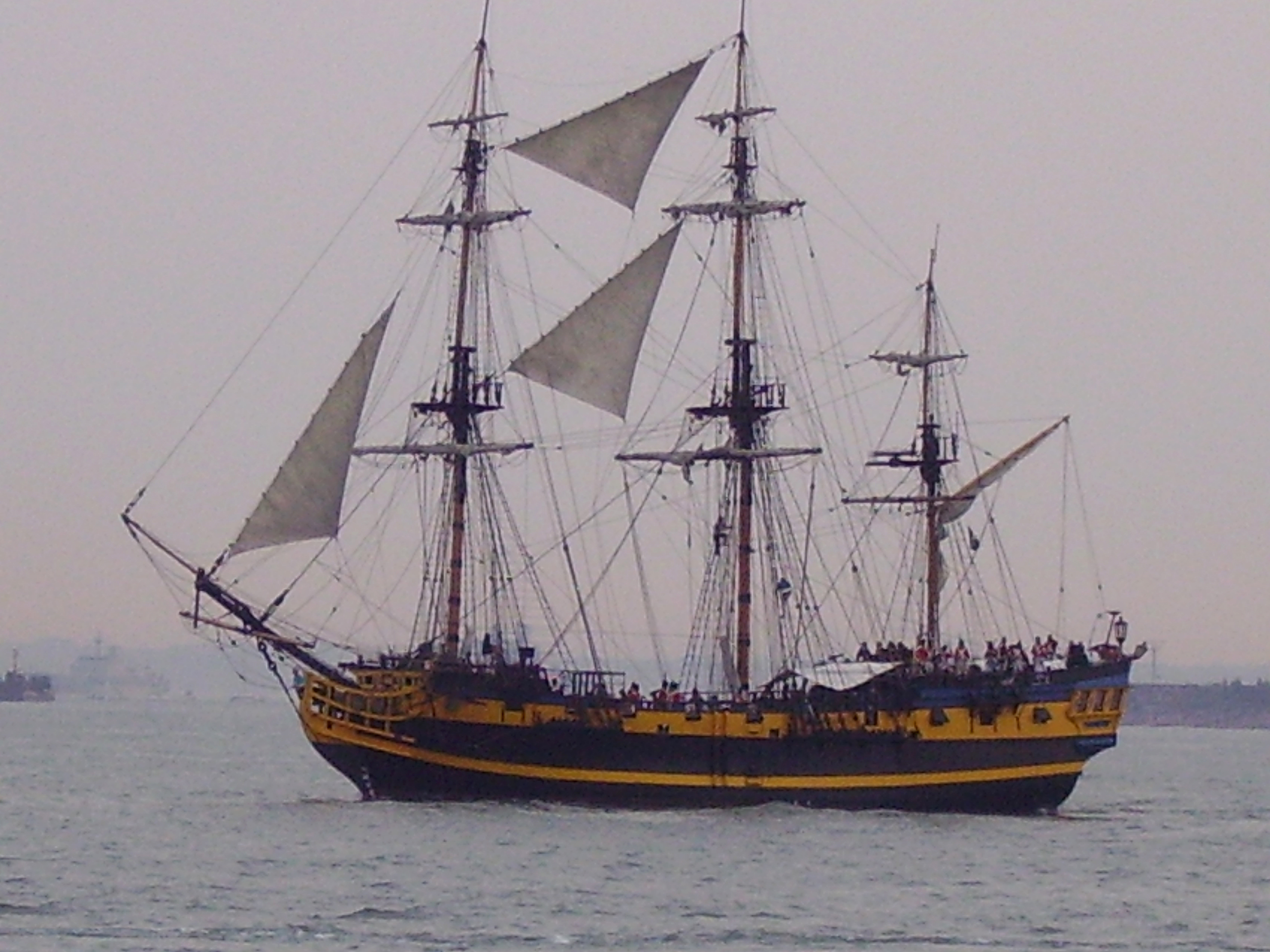
Frigate Grand Turk, before 'battle'

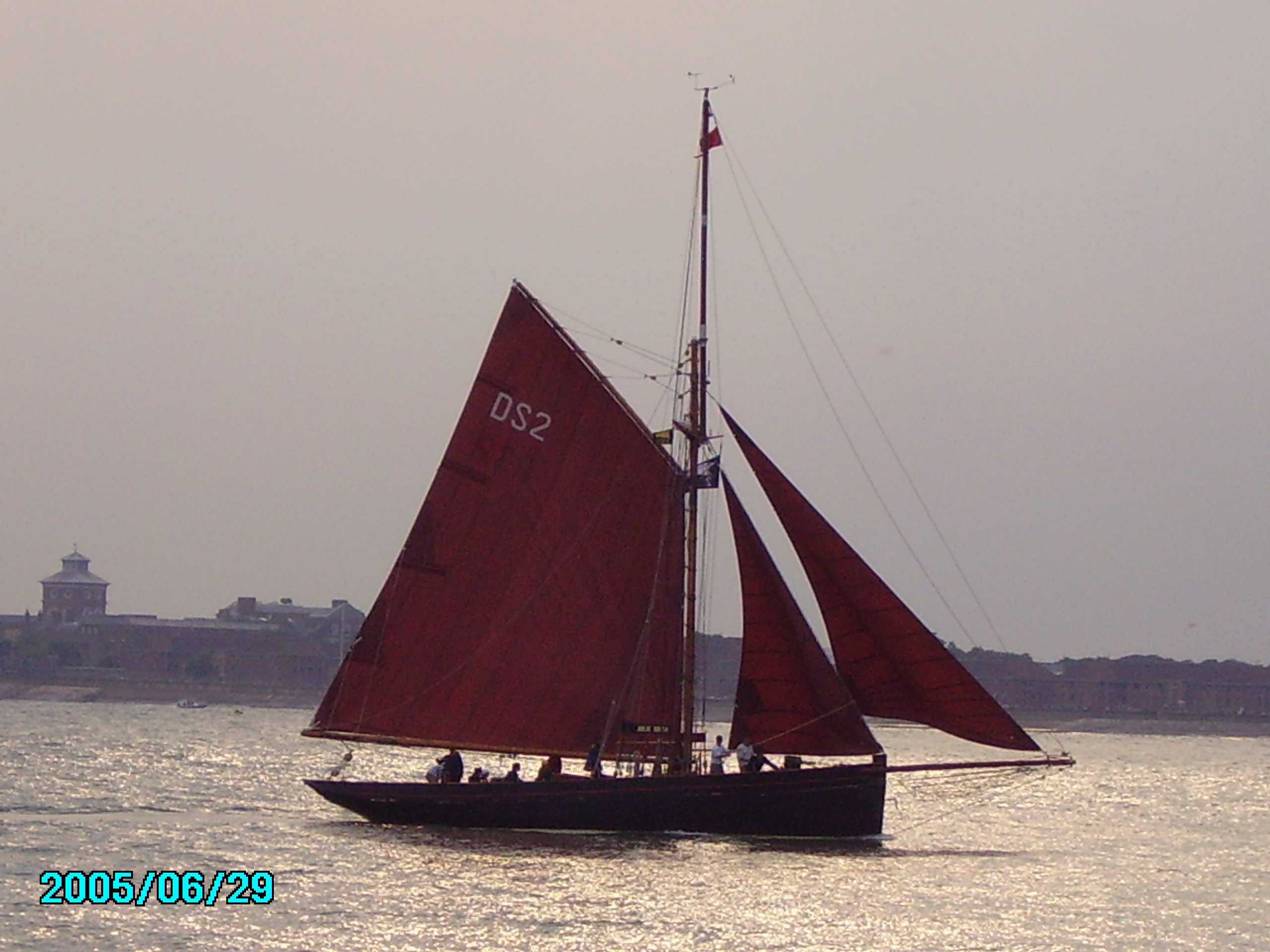
Jolie Brise in the evening light before 'battle'

== See also ==
- Fleet review (Commonwealth realms)
- International Festival of the Sea, 2005
