= HMS Mermaid =

Sixteen ships of the Royal Navy and its predecessors have been named Mermaid after the mermaid:

- English ship Mermaid (1545) was a galley captured in 1545 and listed until 1563.
- English ship Mermaid (1651) was a 24-gun ship of the navy of the Commonwealth of England launched in 1651 and taken into the new Royal Navy in 1660, rebuilt as a 32-gun fifth rate in 1689, rebuilt again in 1707 and broken up in 1734.
- HMS Mermaid (1692) was an 8-gun fireship captured in 1692 and burnt by accident in 1693.
- HMS Mermaid was to have been a 24-gun sixth rate. She was renamed HMS Kennington in 1735 and launched in 1736.
- HMS Mermaid was a 54-gun fourth rate launched in 1708 as HMS Ruby. She was renamed HMS Mermaid in 1744 and was sold in 1748.
- HMS Mermaid (1749) was a 24-gun sixth-rate frigate launched in 1749 and wrecked in 1760.
- HMS Mermaid (1761) was a 28-gun sixth-rate frigate launched in 1761 and wrecked during combat in 1778.
- HMS Mermaid (1782) was a 32-gun fifth-rate frigate launched in 1784 and broken up in 1815.
- HMS Mermaid (1798) was a 1-gun gunvessel purchased in 1798 and sold in 1800.
- HMS Mermaid (1817) was a cutter built at Howrah in 1816, purchased by the Australian Government in 1817 for use as a survey vessel. Wrecked off Cairns in 1829.
- HMS Mermaid (1825) was a 46-gun fifth-rate frigate launched in 1825, used as a powder hulk from 1850, lent to the war department in 1863 and broken up by 1875.
- HMS Mermaid (1853) was a coastguard vessel purchased in 1853 and sold in 1890.
- HMS Mermaid (1898) was a Mermaid-class destroyer launched in 1898 and sold in 1919.
- HMS Mermaid (U30) was a modified Black Swan-class sloop launched in 1943. She was transferred to the German Navy in 1959 and renamed Scharnhorst, was hulked for damage control training between 1974 and 1989, and was towed to be broken up in 1990.
- HMS Mermaid (M1184) was a Ton-class minesweeper launched in 1954 as HMS Sullington. She was renamed HMS Mermaid on her conversion to a survey vessel in 1965. She was sold in 1970.
- HMS Mermaid (F76) was a frigate, built for the Ghana Navy as Black Star but cancelled, launched in 1966 but unused until purchased by the Royal Navy in 1972. Sold to the Royal Malaysian Navy as KD Hang Tuah in 1977, later refitted as a training ship.

== Battle honours ==
Ships named Mermaid have earned the following battle honours:

- Cadiz 1596
- Dover 1652
- Gabbard 1653
- Scheveningen 1653
- Porto Farina 1655
- Lowestoft 1665
- Belgian Coast 1914–17
- Arctic 1944

== See also ==
- HMAS Mermaid is a Paluma-class survey motor launch of the Royal Australian Navy, launched in 1989 and currently in service.
- His Majesty's hired armed vessel Mermaid, which was present at the Vlieter Incident in August 1799.
