= List of ships present at International Fleet Review 2013 =

List of ships present at the International Fleet Review, Sydney, October 2013.

== Royal Australian Navy representatives ==
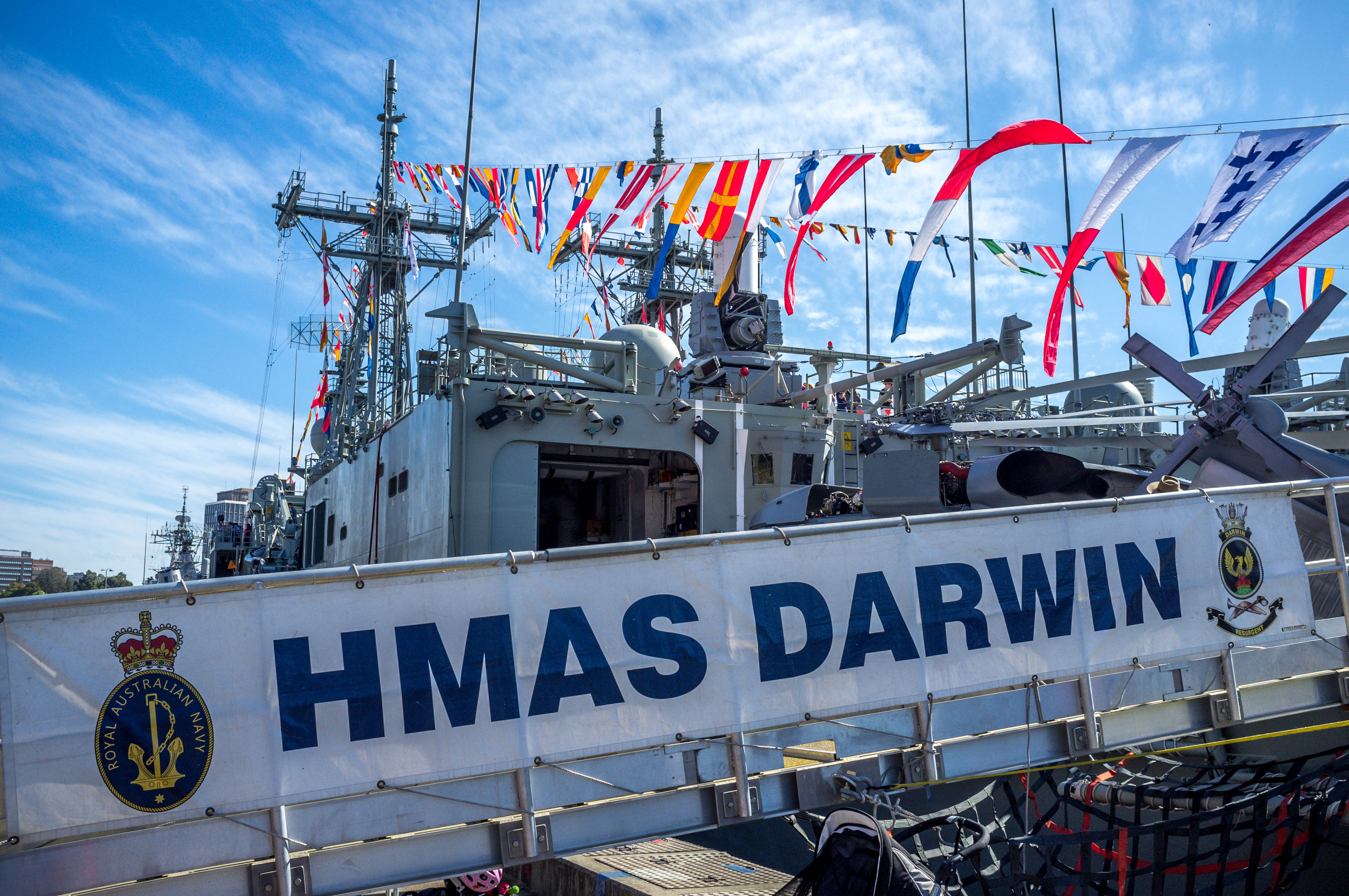

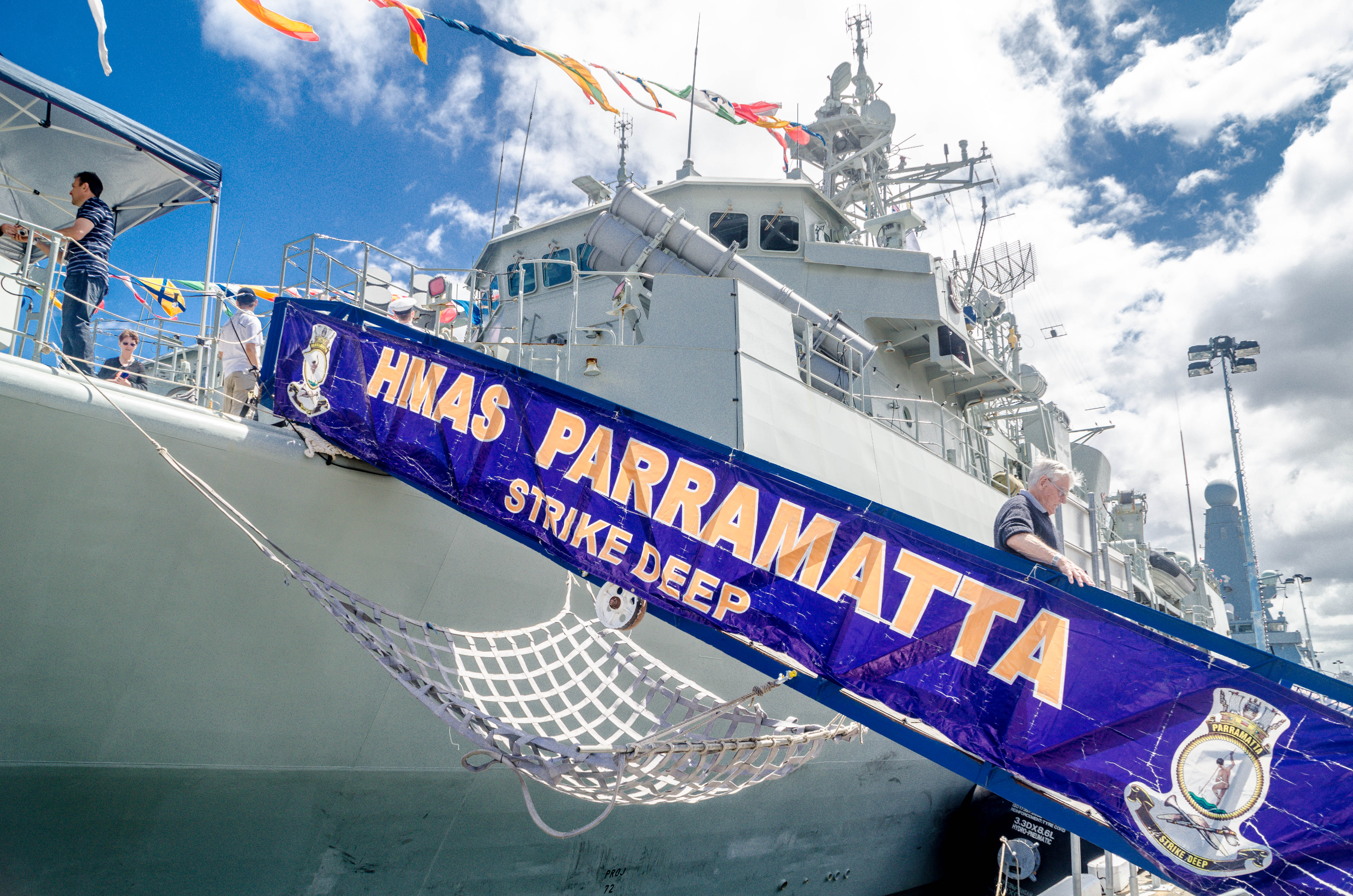

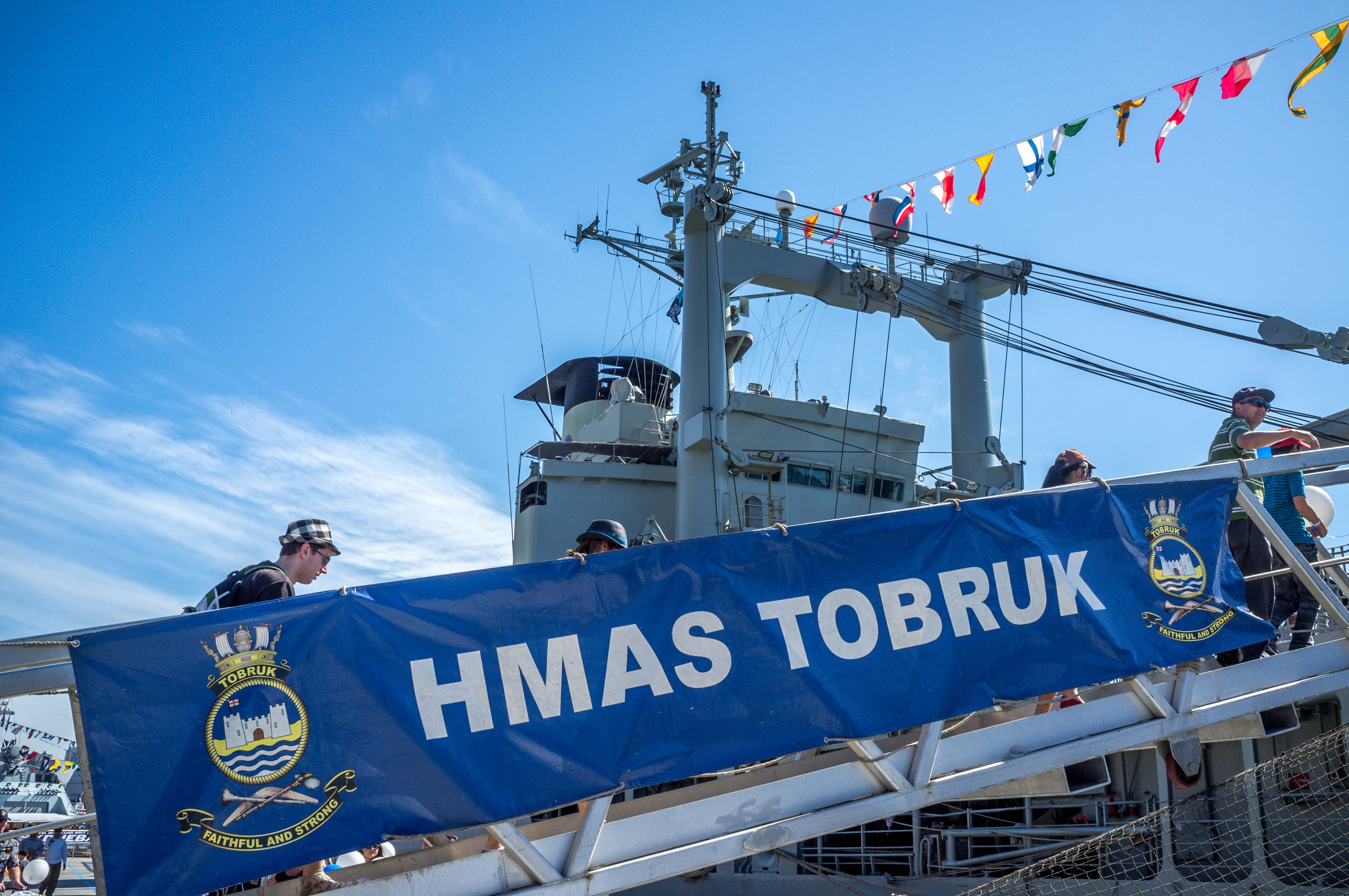

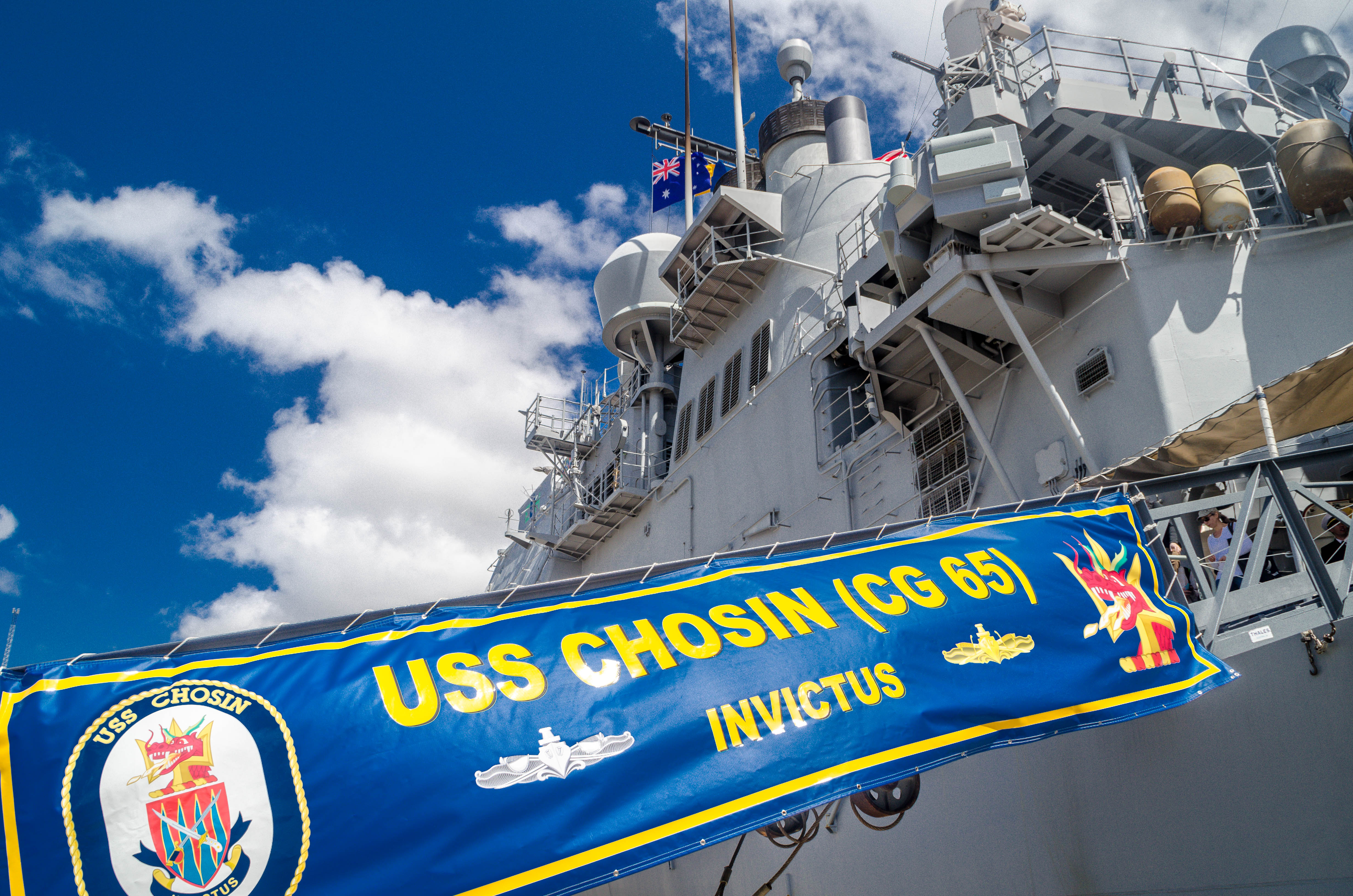

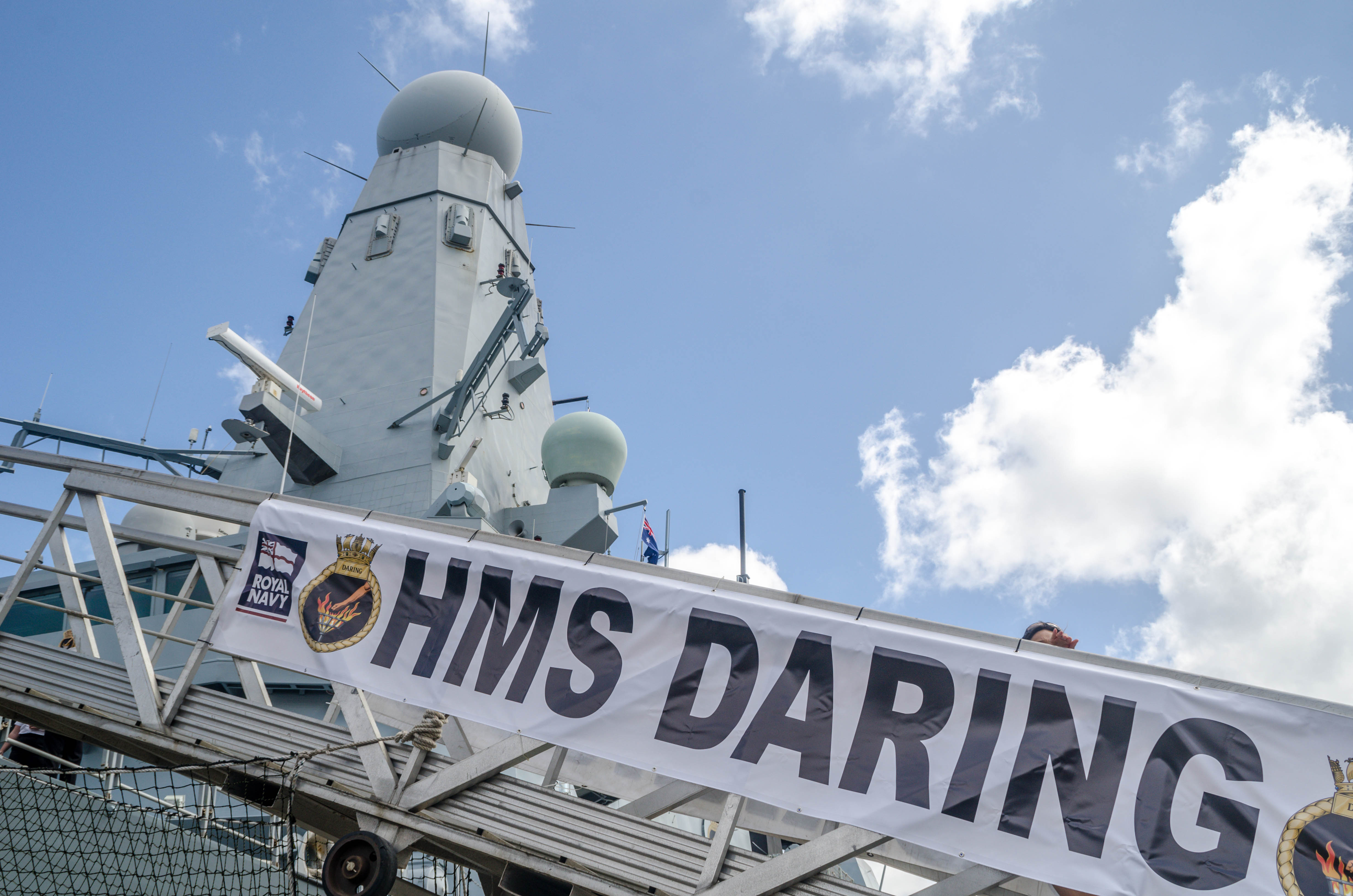

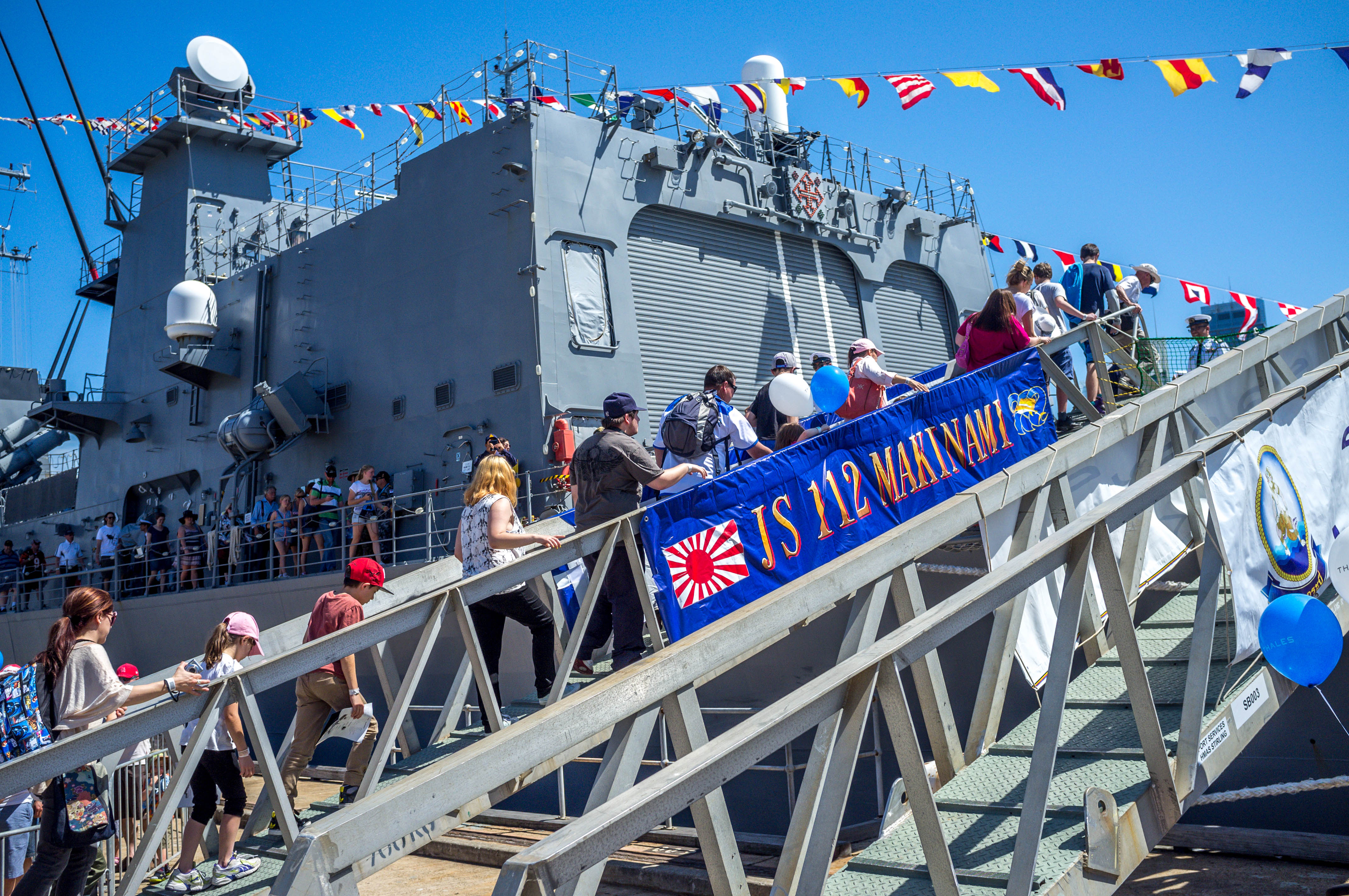

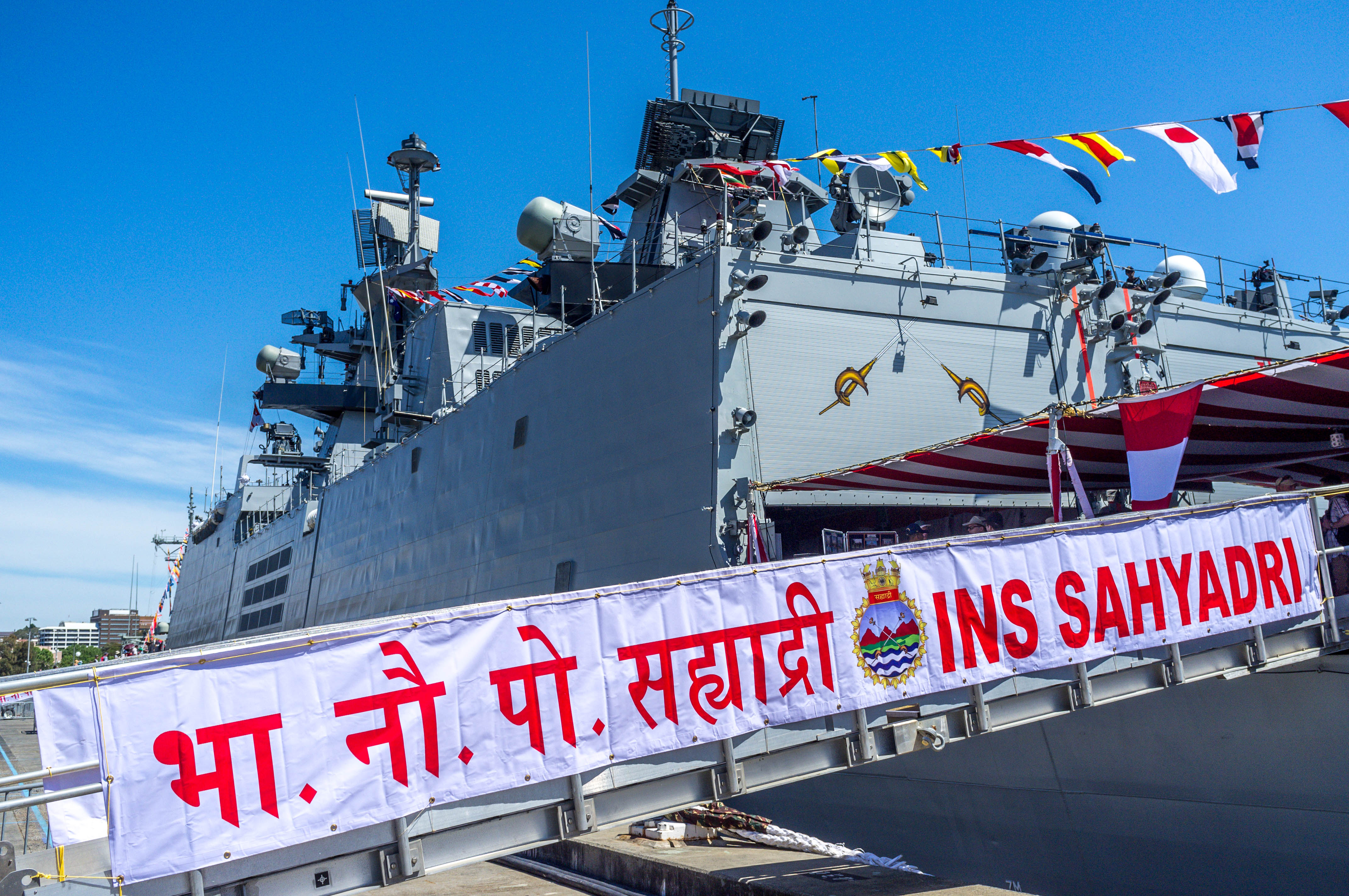

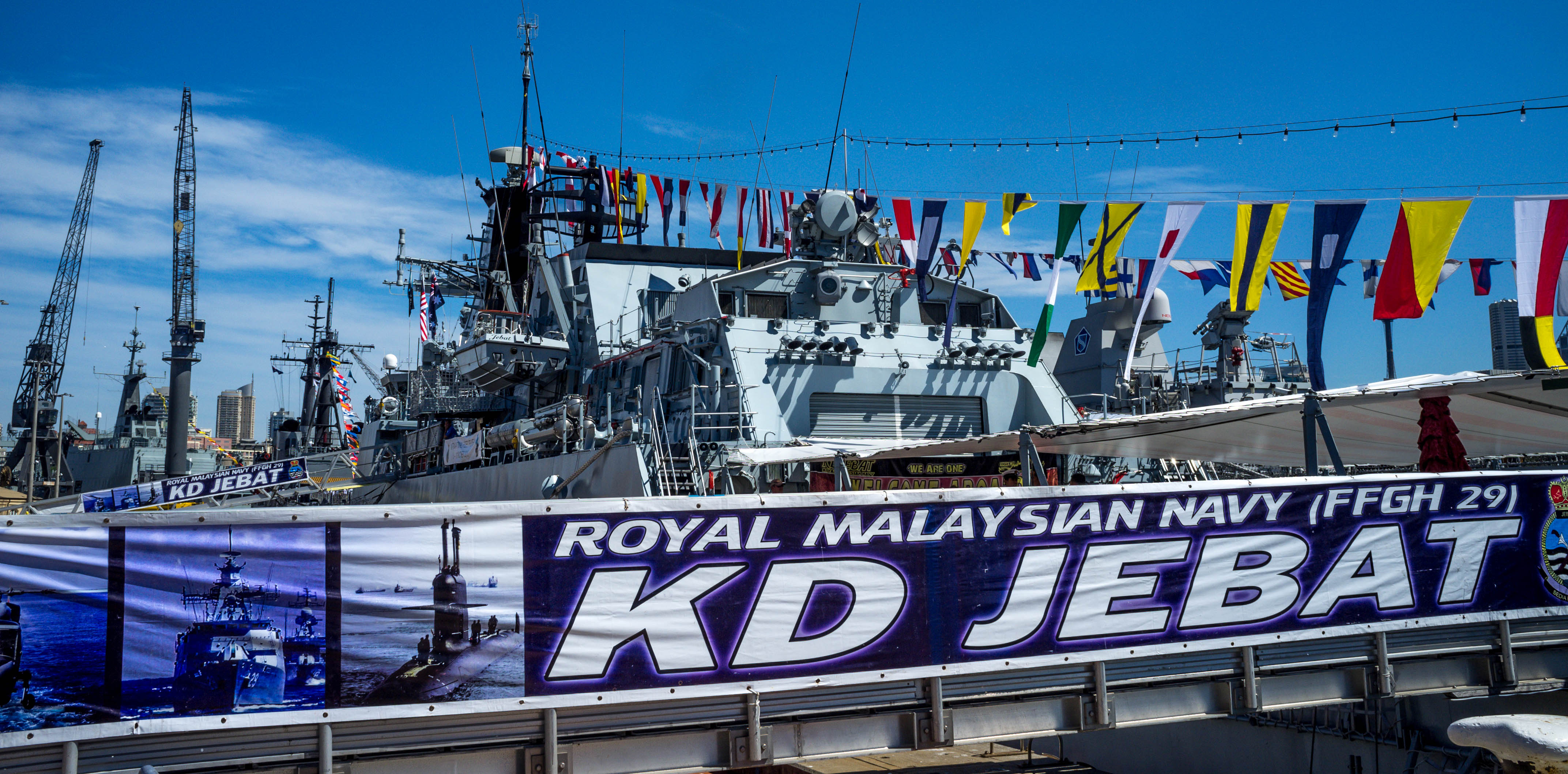

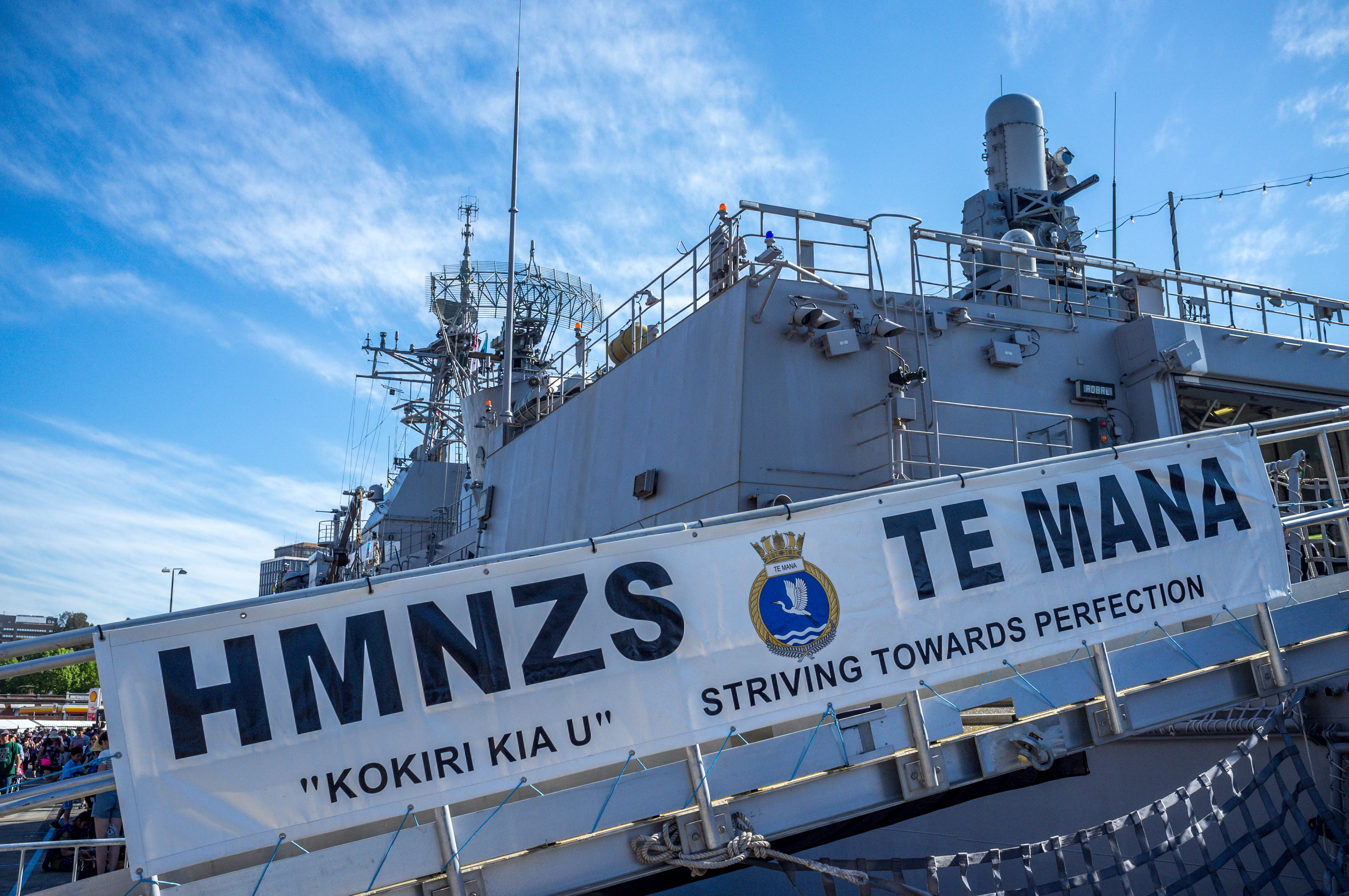

=== Frigate ===
- HMAS Sydney
- HMAS Darwin
- HMAS Parramatta
- HMAS Perth
- HMAS Stuart

=== Patrol boat ===
- HMAS Broome
- HMAS Bundaberg

=== Submarines ===
- HMAS Farncomb

=== Support & auxiliary vessels ===
- HMAS Benalla
- HMAS Diamantina
- HMAS Huon
- HMAS Gascoyne
- HMAS Leeuwin
- HMAS Shepparton
- HMAS Success
- HMAS Tobruk
- HMAS Yarra

=== Offshore support ships ===
- ADV Ocean Shield (civilian operated)

=== Landing ships ===
- HMAS Labuan
- HMAS Tarakan

== International naval representatives ==
=== Amphibious transport dock ===
==== Republic of Singapore Navy ====
- RSS Endeavour

=== Cruisers ===
==== United States Navy ====
- USS Chosin

=== Destroyers ===
==== Royal Navy ====
- HMS Daring

==== Japan Maritime Self-Defense Force ====
- JS Makinami

==== People's Liberation Army Navy ====
- PLANS Qingdao

=== Frigates ===
==== French Navy ====
- Vendémiaire

==== Indian Navy ====
- INS Sahyadri

==== Malaysian Navy ====
- KD Jebat

==== Royal New Zealand Navy ====
- HMNZS Te Mana

=== Corvettes ===
==== Indonesian Navy ====
- KRI Sultan Iskandar Muda

=== Patrol ships ===
==== Royal Brunei Navy ====
- KDB Darulaman

==== Royal Thai Navy ====
- HTMS Krabi

==== Nigerian Navy ====
- NNS Thunder, a former Hamilton-class US Coast Guard cutter, was the sole vessel from an African nation.

=== Replenishment oilers ===
==== Spanish Navy ====
- Cantabria

== Non-naval ships ==
=== Australian ===
==== Tall ships ====
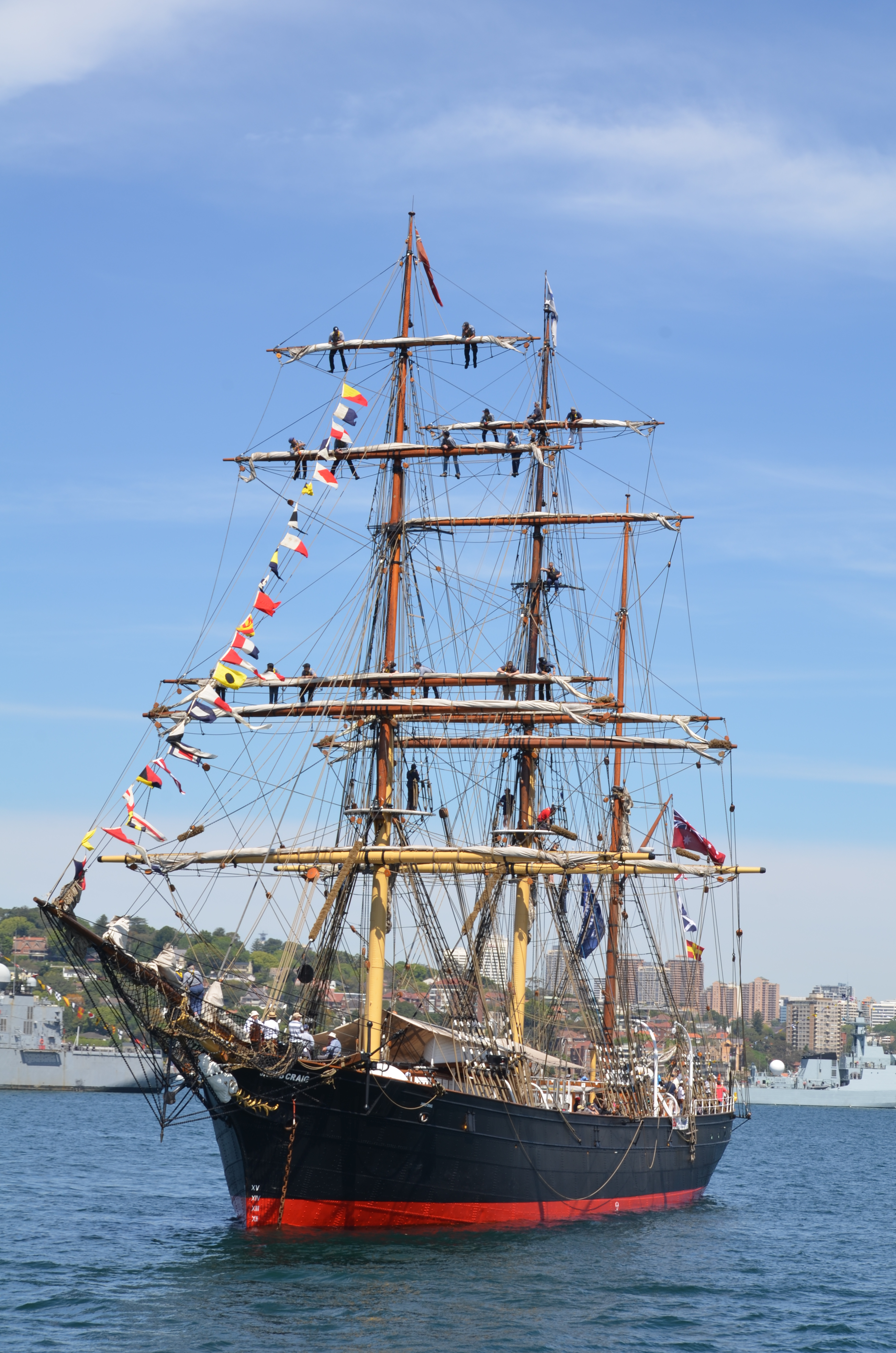
James Craig during the review

- STS Young Endeavour
- James Craig
- Lady Nelson (replica)
- Windeward Bound
- HM Bark Endeavour (replica)
- Southern Swan
- Søren Larsen
- Coral Trekker
- South Passage
- Rainbow Gypsy

==== Steam launch ====
- Lady Hopetoun

==== Patrol boat ====
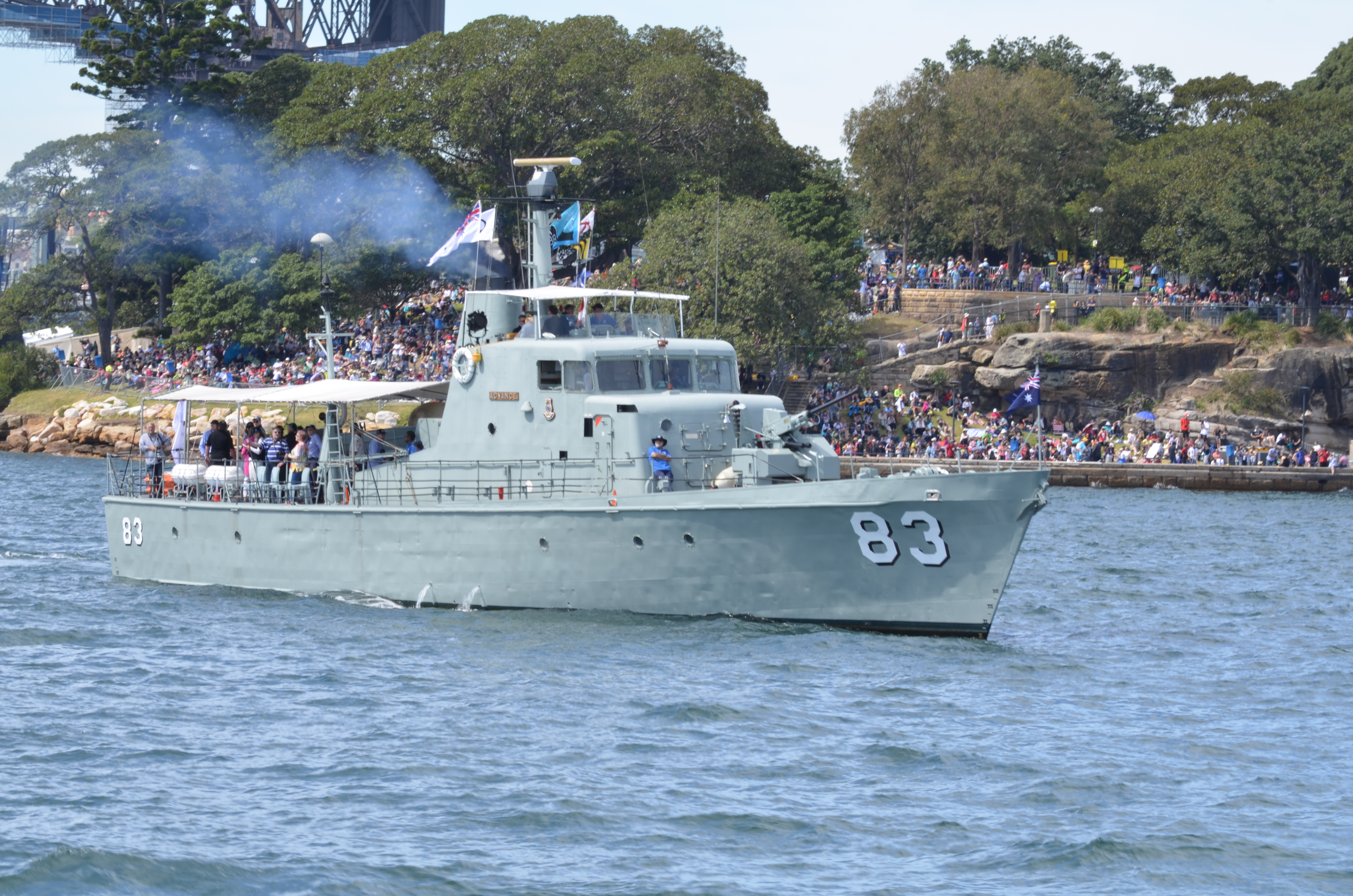
HMAS Advance on Sydney Harbour in October 2013

- ex-HMAS Advance

=== Netherlands ===
- Oosterschelde
- Tecla
- Europa

=== New Zealand ===
- Spirit of New Zealand

=== British ===
- STS Lord Nelson

=== Cook Islands ===
- Picton Castle
