= Operation Yasi Assist =

- Part of Response to Severe Tropical Cyclone Yasi
- Type: National emergency response contingency
- Location: Cyclone affected areas of Queensland
- Planned by: Emergency Management Queensland (EMQ)
- Objective: Cyclone relief
- Date: 3 February 2011 – 14 February 2011; 12pm
- Executed by: Joint Task Force 664
- Casualties: 1 killed

Operation Yasi Assist was a multi-Service activity by the Australian Defence Force (ADF) as part of the response to Severe Tropical Cyclone Yasi. Coordinated to aid civilian emergency response efforts, at Federal inter-departmental level it was managed by Emergency Management Queensland. It comprised units and personnel from the Royal Australian Navy (RAN), Australian Army, and Royal Australian Air Force (RAAF) operating as Joint Task Force 664 (JTF 664). The operation was initially commanded by Brigadier Stuart Smith, based at Lavarack Barracks in Townsville.

== Activities ==
JTF 664 was established on 2 February 2011 to command the ADF units responding to the cyclone. The RAAF provided aeromedical evacuations for 255 patients in Cairns Base Hospital and Cairns Private Hospital on the night of 1–2 February. The operation was described by Queensland Premier Anna Bligh as the largest aeromedical evacuation in Australia's history.

By 9 February, one week after the cyclone, the ADF had deployed 1,200 personnel to affected regions with another 400 outside those regions providing air transport and aerial survey. An AP-3C Orion configured for Defence Imagery and Geospatial Organisation aerial survey mapped the damage across a wide area of Queensland. The Army Aviation Corps deployed four S70A-9 Black Hawk, one CH-47D Chinook and three NH90 helicopters. Army engineers deployed to coastal towns by LCM-8 and LARC-V landing craft as roads were blocked by debris. Engineers cleared 230 km of roads in the first week.

The hydrographic survey ship HMAS Benalla surveyed the port of Townsville for submerged debris, allowing the port to reopen three days after the cyclone.

The Landing Craft Heavy, HMAS Brunei under the command of LCDR Carl Jordan, RAN was Force Assigned immediately after the cyclone had made landfall and sailed from Cairns to Townsville to embarked Army engineers and equipment for offload at Mourilyan Harbour in support of Disaster relief operations.

The heavy landing ship HMAS Tobruk, in dry dock for major repairs, was rushed back into service to assist in logistic support.

== See also ==
- Operation Queensland Flood Assist
