= Europa (barque) =

Steel-hulled barque

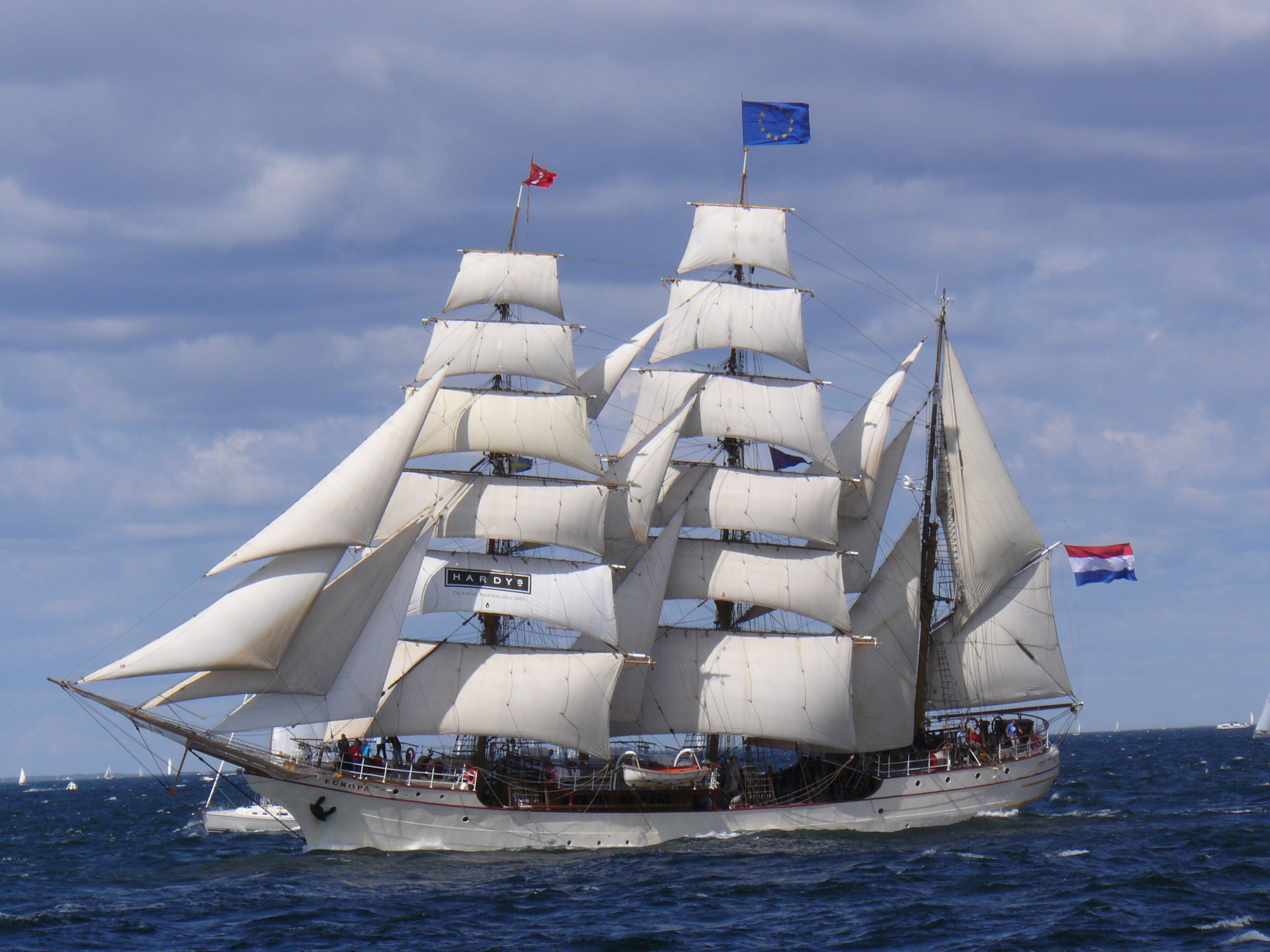
- Europa 2007

History

Germany
- Name: Senator Brockes
- Namesake: Barthold Heinrich Brockes (1680-1747)
- Builder: H. C. Stülcken & Sohn, Hamburg, Germany
- Cost: 300,000 Reichsmark
- Yard number: 409
- Launched: 1911 There was an earlier ship named Europa.
- Out of service: 1977
- Fate: Sold, 1985

History

Netherlands
- Name: Europa
- Owner: Rederij bark EUROPA, Rotterdam, The Netherlands
- Operator: Rederij bark EUROPA, Rotterdam, The Netherlands
- Port of registry: The Hague, The Netherlands
- Christened: 1994
- Acquired: 1985
- In service: 1994
- Home port: The Hague
- Identification: IMO number: 8951932; Call Sign: PDZS
- Status: Active

General characteristics
- Type: Three-masted steel barque
- Tonnage: 303 GT
- Length: 39.8 m (131 ft)
- Beam: 7.45 m (24.4 ft)
- Height: 33 m (108 ft)
- Draught: 3.8 m (12 ft)
- Depth of hold: 4.6 m (15 ft)
- Installed power: 2 × 365 HP Caterpillar 6-cyl. Diesel
- Propulsion: Sail; auxiliary Diesel engine
- Sail plan: 30 sails (incl. 6 studding sails; 1,250 m^{2} (13,500 sq ft) sail area
- Speed: 13 knots (24 km/h; 15 mph)
- Range: Worldwide
- Complement: 64

Europa is a steel-hulled barque registered in the Netherlands. Originally she was a German lightship, named Senator Brockes and built in 1911 at the H.C. Stülcken & Sohn shipyard in Hamburg, Germany. Until 1977, she was in use by the German Federal Coast Guard as a lightship on the river Elbe. A Dutchman bought the vessel (or what was left of her) in 1985 and in 1994 she was fully restored as a barque, a three-mast rigged vessel, and retrofitted for special-purpose sail-training.

Europa cruises worldwide and accepts paying voyage crew (trainees) for short or long trip segments, including ocean crossings, Sail Training Association races, and annual voyages to Antarctica, and between South Georgia, Tristan da Cunha, and Cape Town.

In 2002 and 2013 she rounded Cape Horn. In 2010 she participated in Velas Sudamerica 2010, an historical Latin American tour by eleven tall ships to celebrate the bicentennial of the first national governments of Argentina and Chile.

In 2013-2014 Europa circumnavigated the world together with two other Dutch tall ships, Tecla and Oosterschelde. They sailed from South Africa to Mauritius, Australia and New Zealand. In October 2013 Europa participated in the International Fleet Review 2013 in Sydney. From New Zealand, the ship sailed an official Cape Horn rounding (October - December 2013). In June 2014 Europa completed her circumnavigation by arriving in Amsterdam.

On 20 May 2023, Europa fell over during an attempt to transfer the steel-hulled barque back into the water from drydock at a Cape Town ship repair facility. One crewmember was injured in the attempt.

== Gallery ==
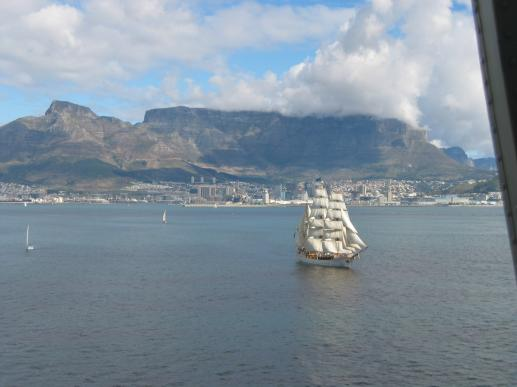
Europa sailing in front of Table Mountain, South Africa

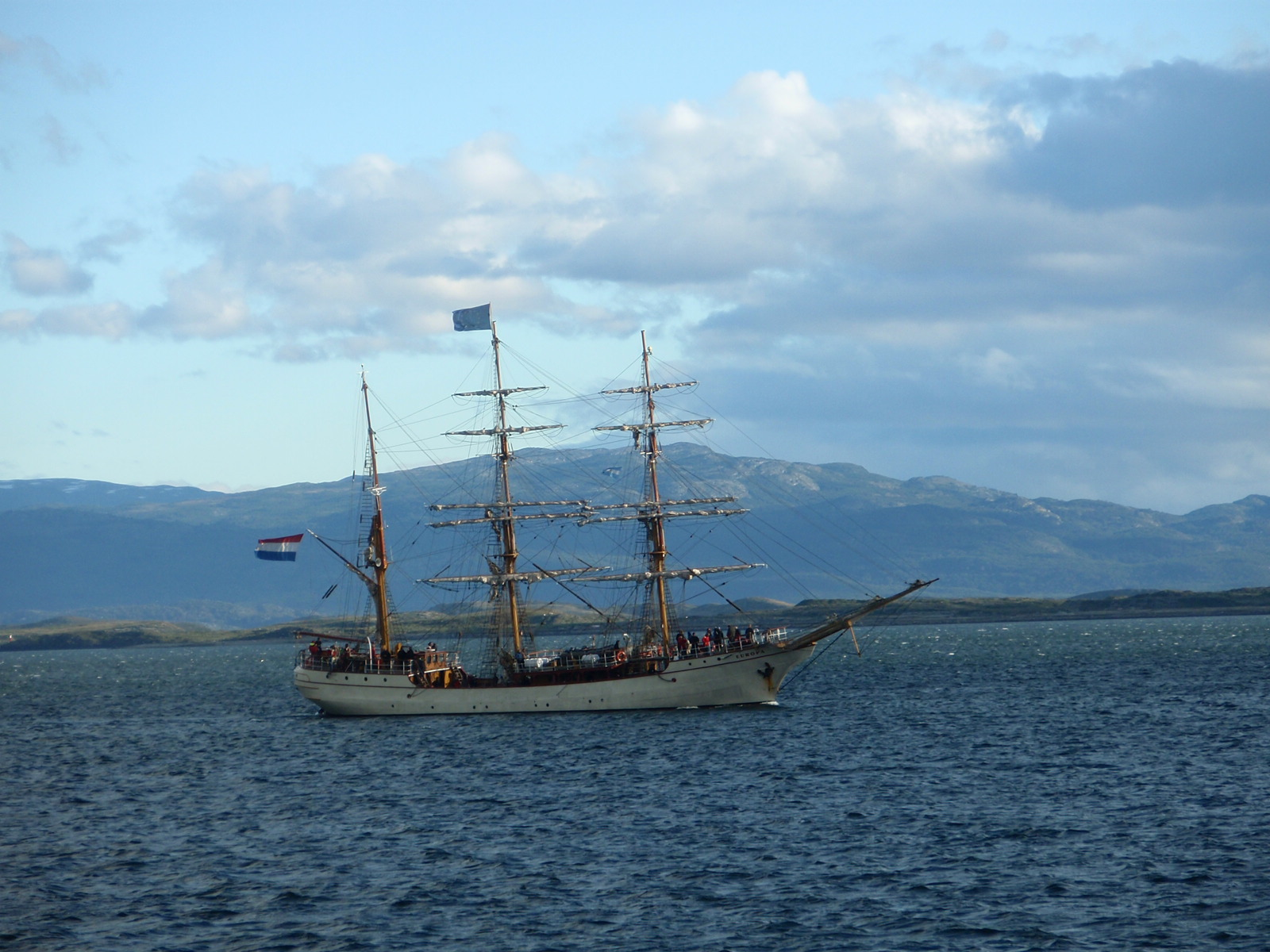
Europa sailing off Ushuaia, Argentina

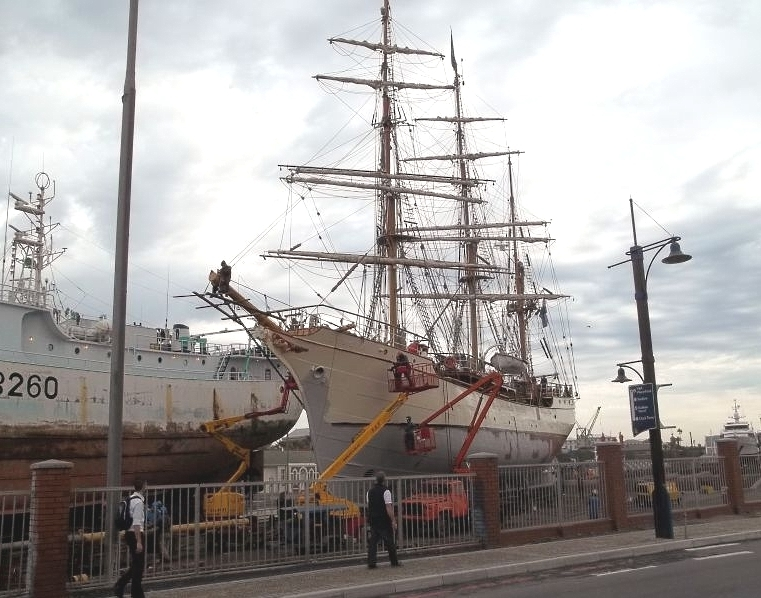
Europa in a shipyard in Cape Town, South Africa

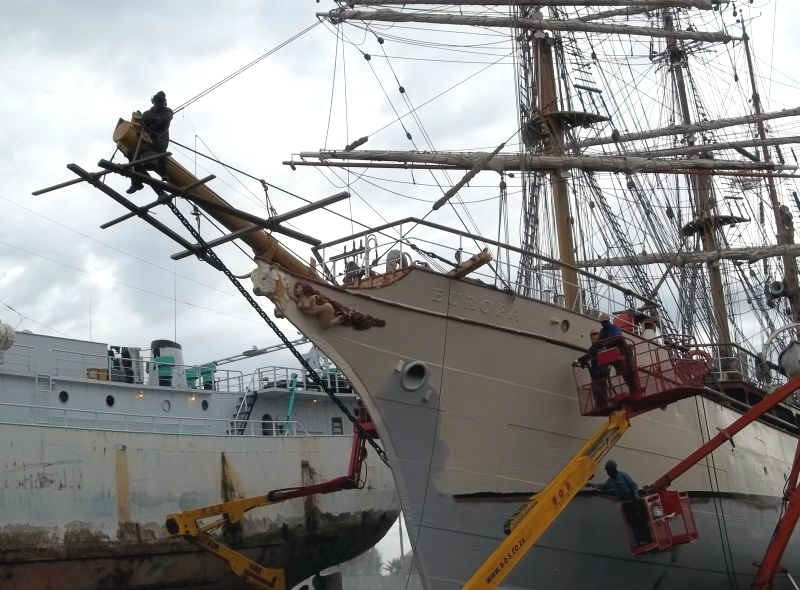
Shipyard workers at work, Cape Town - South Africa

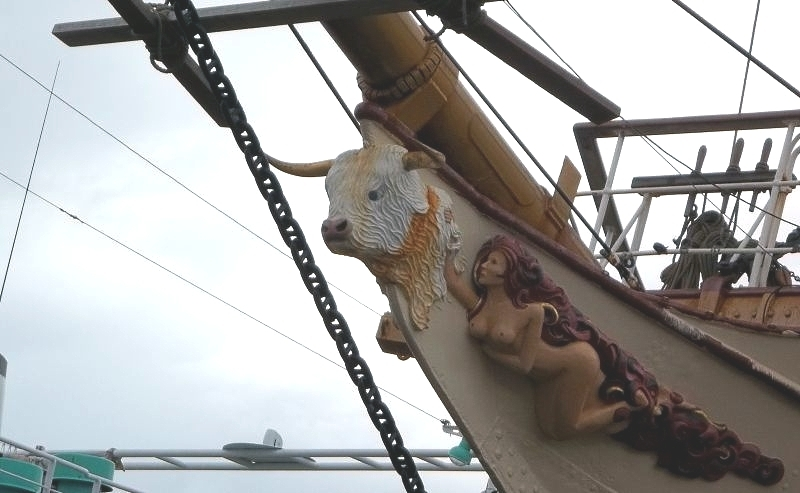
Figurehead with Europa and the bull

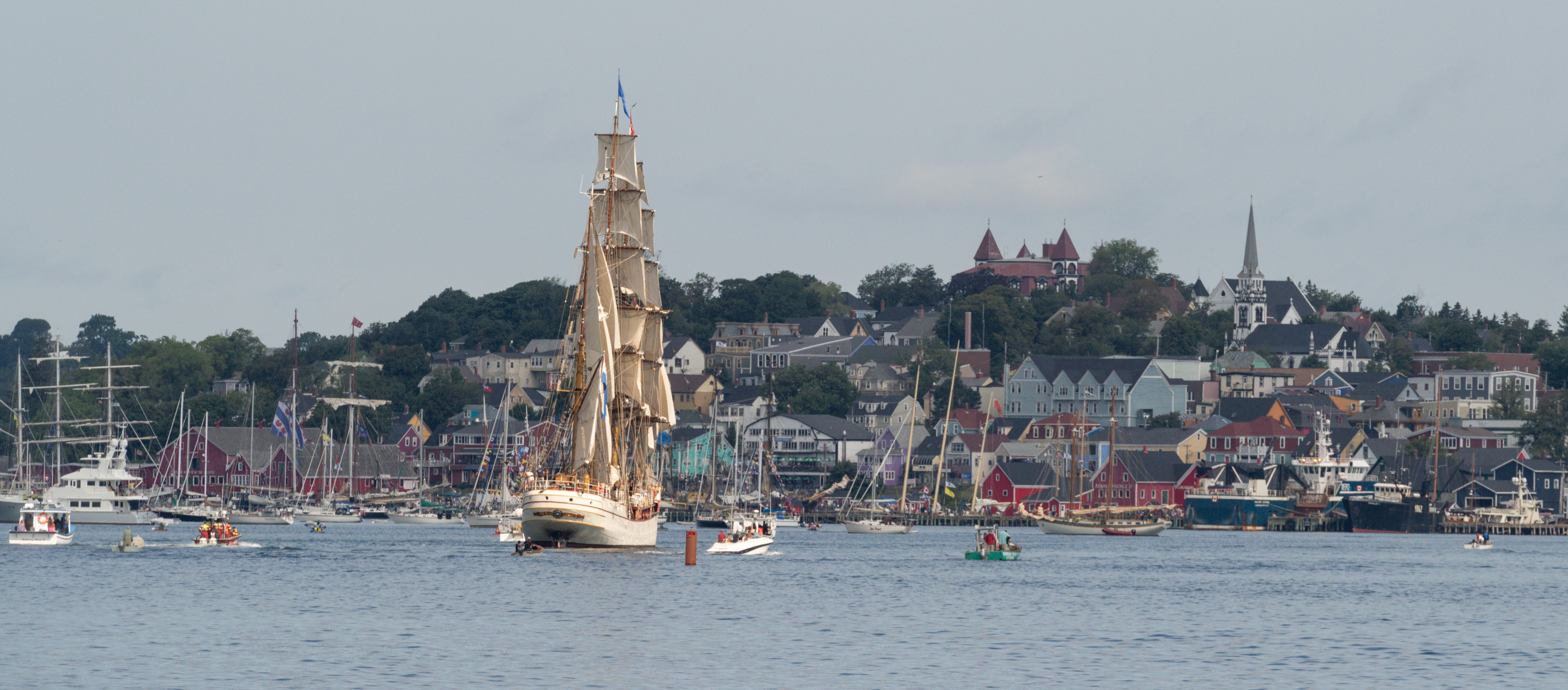
The Dutch barque STS Europa entering Lunenburg Harbour, Nova Scotia, Canada, during the Rendez-Vous 2017 Tall Ships Regatta. The UNESCO World Heritage town of Lunenburg forms the background.
