= HMAS Benalla =

Two ships of the Royal Australian Navy (RAN) have been named HMAS Benalla, after the city of Benalla, Victoria.

- HMAS Benalla (J323), a Bathurst-class corvette commissioned in 1943 and sold for scrap in 1958
- HMAS Benalla (A 04), a Paluma-class motor launch commissioned in 1990 and active as of 2016

== Battle honours ==
One battle honour is carried by ships named HMAS Benalla:

- New Guinea 1943–44
