= Cyclone Yasi =

Category 5 South Pacific and Australian region cyclone in 2011

Severe Tropical Cyclone Yasi
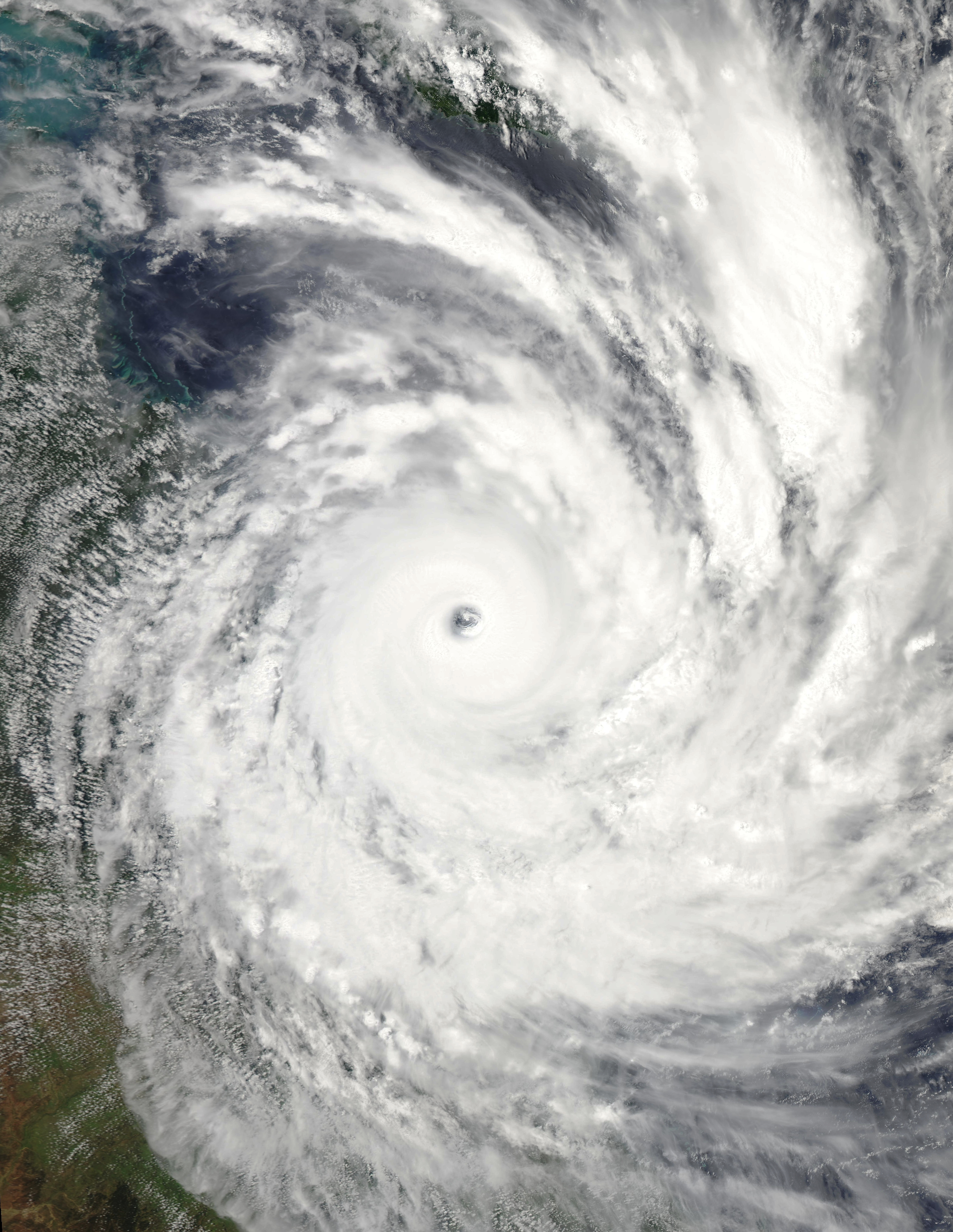
- Cyclone Yasi approaching Queensland near peak intensity on 2 February 2011

Meteorological history
- Formed: 26 January 2011
- Remnant low: 3 February 2011
- Dissipated: 6 February 2011

Category 5 severe tropical cyclone
- 10-minute sustained (BOM)
- Highest winds: 205 km/h (125 mph)
- Highest gusts: 285 km/h (180 mph)
- Lowest pressure: 929 hPa (mbar); 27.43 inHg

Category 4-equivalent tropical cyclone
- 1-minute sustained (SSHWS/JTWC)
- Highest winds: 250 km/h (155 mph)
- Lowest pressure: 922 hPa (mbar); 27.23 inHg

Overall effects
- Fatalities: 1 indirect
- Damage: A$3.5 billion (Costliest tropical cyclone in the Australian region basin)
- Areas affected: Tuvalu, Fiji, Solomon Islands, Vanuatu, Papua New Guinea, Australia
- IBTrACS
- Part of the 2010–11 South Pacific and Australian region cyclone seasons

Severe Tropical Cyclone Yasi (/ˈjɑːsiː/; Fijian: [ˈjasi], lit. 'sandalwood') was a powerful and destructive tropical cyclone that made landfall in northern Queensland, Australia in early 2011, causing major damage to the affected areas. Originating as a tropical low near Fiji on 26 January, the system intensified to tropical cyclone status during the evening of 30 January. Yasi deepened rapidly over the next 24 hours, and was classified as a Category 3 cyclone at about 5 PM AEST (07:00 UTC) on 31 January 2011. Late on 1 February, the cyclone strengthened to a Category 4 system; then, early on 2 February, the cyclone intensified into a Category 5 Severe Tropical Cyclone. The system had a well-defined eye and continued to track west-southwestward, maintaining a central pressure of 930 hPa (27 inHg) and a Dvorak intensity of T6.5 into the evening.

At about 12:00 AM AEST (14:00 UTC) on 3 February, Yasi crossed the Australian coastline as a Category 5 severe tropical cyclone near Mission Beach, with estimated maximum 3-second gusts of 285 km/h spanning an area from Ingham to Cairns. A record low pressure of 929 hPa (27.43 inHg) was measured as the eye passed over Tully. Due to the size of the system and its strong core, Yasi maintained cyclonic intensity farther inland than normal, finally dissipating into a tropical low near Mount Isa, at 10 PM on 3 February 2011, 22 hours after the storm first crossed the coast. The storm caused an estimated AU$3.5 billion (US$3.6 billion) in damage, making it the costliest tropical cyclone to hit Australia on record (not accounting for inflation; otherwise, Cyclone Tracy was costlier). Yasi was also indirectly responsible for the death of a 23-year-old man, who died from suffocation by generator exhaust fumes.

Tropical Cyclone Yasi was the biggest storm in Queensland's history, with more than 10,000 people moved from their homes. The storm passed between the two big cities of Cairns and Townsville which only suffered minor damage. Early estimates of damage put the cost at about AU$100 million. It did not cause as much damage as government expected, as it missed major cities. It did however destroy 30% of the houses in Tully. At least 75% of the banana crop was destroyed, and damage to the sugar cane farms was expected to cost about AU$500 million. Damage to power lines left 150,000 homes without electricity.

== Meteorological history ==
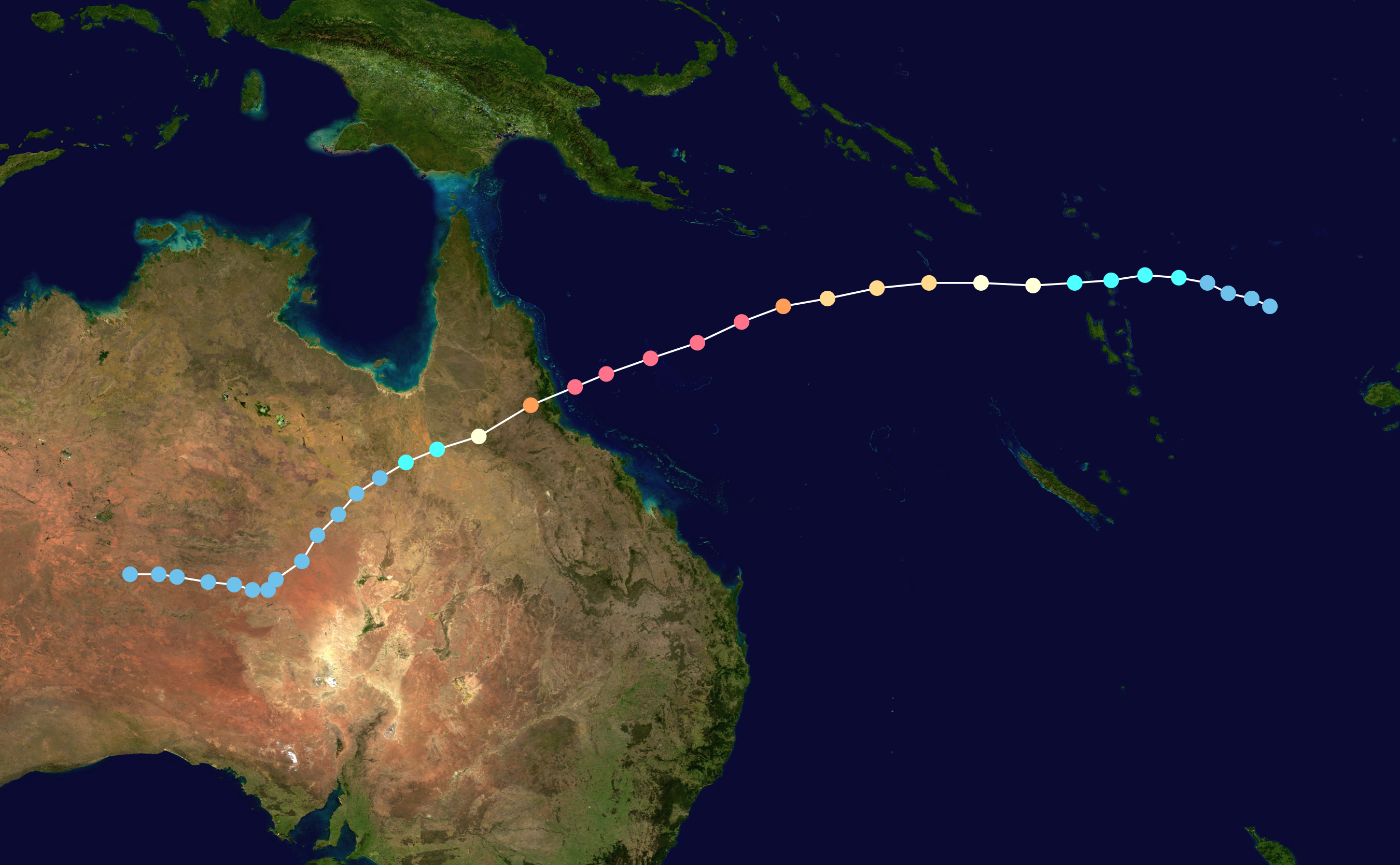
Map plotting the storm's track and intensity, according to the Saffir–Simpson scale Map key Saffir–Simpson scale Tropical depression (≤38 mph, ≤62 km/h) Tropical storm (39–73 mph, 63–118 km/h) Category 1 (74–95 mph, 119–153 km/h) Category 2 (96–110 mph, 154–177 km/h) Category 3 (111–129 mph, 178–208 km/h) Category 4 (130–156 mph, 209–251 km/h) Category 5 (≥157 mph, ≥252 km/h) Unknown Storm type Tropical cyclone Subtropical cyclone Extratropical cyclone, remnant low, tropical disturbance, or monsoon depression

Tropical Disturbance 09F was first identified on 26 January 2011 by the Fiji Meteorological Service (FMS), while it was 330 km (205 mi) south-southwest of Tuvalu. Over a region of high sea surface temperatures and low to moderate wind shear, it was expected to intensify gradually as it moved southwest. Little development took place over the following two days, though it was classified as a tropical depression on 27 January. By 28 January, the depression was characterised as a poorly-developed low, with a broad area of rotating, flaring convection. Considerable development took place on the following day, prompting the Joint Typhoon Warning Center (JTWC) to issue a Tropical Cyclone Formation Alert. The storm's low-level circulation centre became increasingly defined and convective banding features were apparent along the northern periphery of the depression.

It deepened rapidly throughout 30 January, resulting in the JTWC upgrading the system to a tropical storm after data from an ASCAT image depicted winds near gale-force around the storm's centre. Shortly thereafter, the FMS also upgraded the storm, classifying it as Tropical Cyclone Yasi. Upon being classified a tropical cyclone, Yasi was located about 370 km (230 mi) northeast of Vanuatu. Along the north edge of a strong subtropical ridge, the storm tracked generally westward, taking it through the northern islands of the country. Continuing to rapidly intensify, Yasi attained severe tropical cyclone intensity with ten-minute sustained winds of at least 120 km/h (75 mph) on 31 January, as the primary convective band wrapped around the storm's centre. Later that day, the storm crossed 160°E, prompting the final advisory from the FMS and the first advisory from the Australian Bureau of Meteorology, as the system crossed into the Australian cyclone basin.

Shortly after entering the BoM's area of responsibility, the storm initiated a period of rapid intensification under extremely favorable conditions as it turned southwestward, with a shallow eye developing by 31 January. As the storm continued to intensify, a well defined circular eye developed. The storm reached Category 4 intensity late on 1 February, and Category 5 status early on the next day. Meanwhile, the JTWC assessed the system to have reached Category 4-equivalent status on the Saffir–Simpson scale. Later that day, Yasi reached its peak intensity with 10-minute sustained winds of 125 mph (200 kilometres per hour) and a pressure of 929 hPa (27.43 inches of mercury). At the same time, the JTWC estimated Yasi's winds to have topped out at 155 mph (250 kilometres per hour).

Traveling southwestwards, Yasi remained a powerful storm until its landfall near Mission Beach, Queensland, at 14:00 UTC on February 2. Upon making landfall, the storm rapidly weakened and was no longer a Severe Tropical cyclone 6 hours after landfall. For the next several days, the storm meandered as a depression over Australia, before dissipating on February 6.

== Preparations, impact and aftermath ==
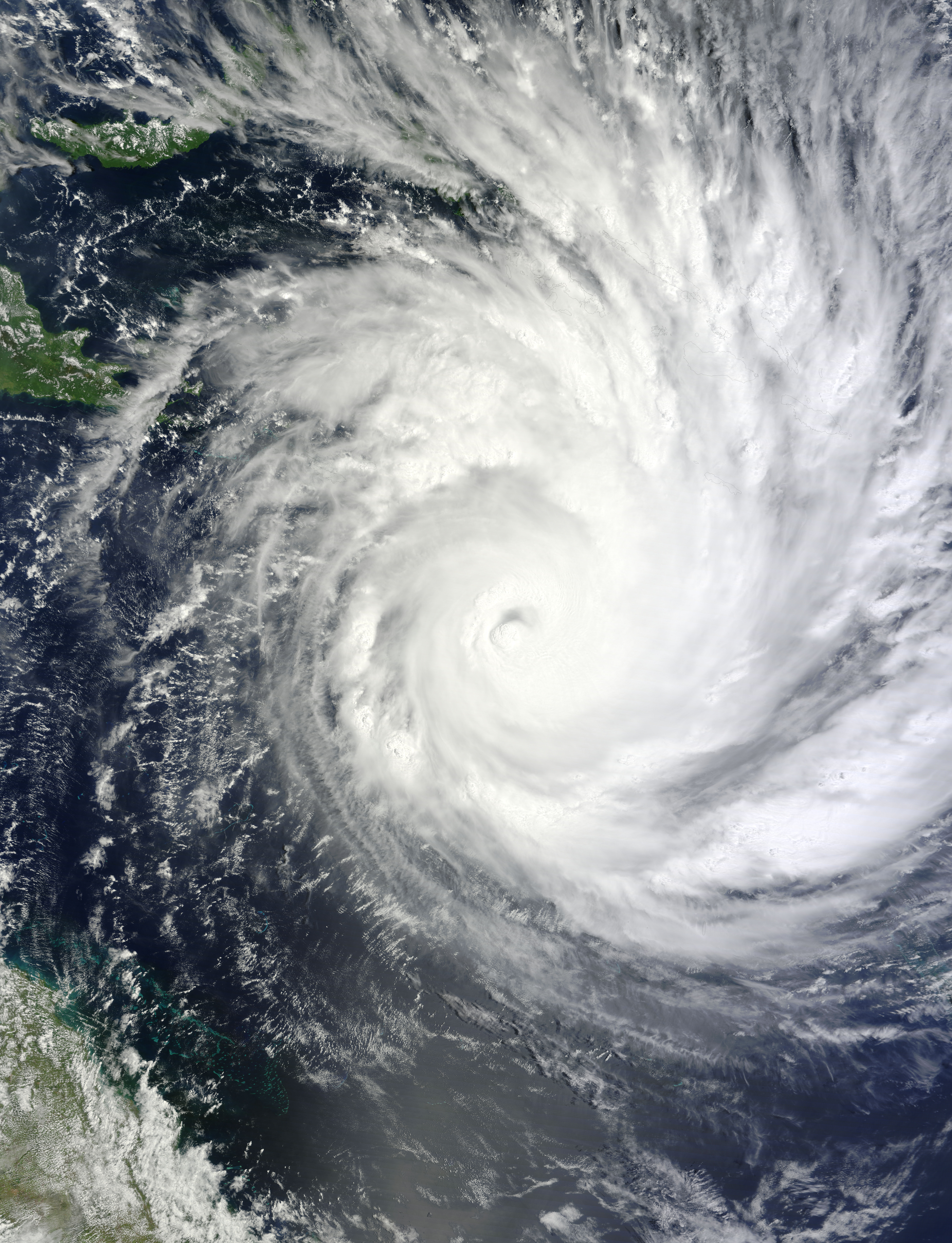
Satellite image of Cyclone Yasi intensifying on 1 February

Severe Tropical Cyclone Yasi directly impacted the Solomon Islands, Vanuatu and parts of Australia, while parts of Fiji and Papua New Guinea were indirectly impacted. As a result of the system's impacts, the name Yasi was subsequently retired from the list of South Pacific tropical cyclone names and replaced with Yvonne.

=== Fiji, Vanuatu, Papua New Guinea and the Solomon Islands ===
Between 23 and 30 January, strong winds and swells were observed in Tuvalu, as Tropical Cyclones Wilma and Yasi developed and passed. These strong winds delayed shipping schedules and affected students studying in Vaitupu and Fiji, and outer islands ran out of fresh supplies as a result of rough seas. During 28–30 January, Yasi's precursor tropical depression caused rain and strong winds over the Fijian islands off Rotuma, Vanua Levu, Taveuni and the northern Yasawa Islands.

During 30 January, Yasi became the second of three systems to directly impact Vanuatu in two months. Tropical Cyclone Yasi moved across Vanuatu's northern Torba Province, with winds reaching up to 95 km/h (60 mph). Vanuatuan officials reported difficulties making contact with the Torba Province, but it was believed that the northern area escaped major damage.

The storm was several hundred kilometres southeast of Papua New Guinea, but the outer edges of the large system brought strong winds, high seas and heavy rain to the country. In Milne Bay Province, local officials advised residents living along the coast to move to higher grounds.

=== Willis Island ===
As Yasi moved into the Australian region meteorological data from the weather station on Willis Island was used to help monitor the system. Ahead of the system impacting the island, staff battened down the buildings and were evacuated off the island by a helicopter during 1 February. Yasi subsequently passed directly over the weather station during 2 February, where wind gusts of 185 km/h (115 mph) and a minimum pressure of 937.9 hPa (27.70 inHg) were recorded, before the meteorological equipment and communications failed. After the system passed over the island, it became clear that the strong winds and storm surge had damaged the radar, key observing systems as well as communications, operational and life support infrastructure. It was also noted that the system had altered the shape of the island and cleared most of its vegetation. Most of the automated surface observing systems and communications were subsequently restored and became operational, fifteen days after Yasi had passed over the island. However, the radar and life-supporting systems took a bit longer to restore and were subsequently completed by the end of November, before staff returned to the island during December 2011.

=== Australia ===
Costliest Australian region tropical cyclones
Rank	Tropical cyclones	Season	Damage
1	4 Yasi	2010–11	$3.6 billion
2	4 Debbie	2016–17	$2.73 billion
3	TS Oswald	2012–13	$2.52 billion
4	4 Alfred	2024–25	$1.36 billion
5	4 Veronica	2018–19	$1.2 billion
6	5 Ita	2013–14	$1.15 billion
7	4 Larry	2005–06	$1.1 billion
8	4 Zelia	2024–25	$733 million
9	4 Jasper	2023–24	$670 million
10	3 Tracy	1974–75	$645 million

By the time Yasi crossed into Australian basin, preparations for the storm were under way. Media outlets referred to the storm as "what could be the state's worst cyclone in history".

Because of its great size, many feared that the tropical cyclone could cause damage more severe than Cyclone Larry in 2006 or Cyclone Tracy, which severely damaged Darwin in 1974. Thousands of residents in the path of the storm were urged to evacuate by Queensland Premier Anna Bligh. Thirty thousand people were evacuated from Cairns, including all patients from Cairns Base Hospital and Cairns Private Hospital who were airlifted by the Royal Australian Air Force and other agencies (such as the Royal Flying Doctor Service) to Brisbane. The Queensland state emergency coordinator warned residents that they would be on their own for up to 24 hours, as the conditions would be too dangerous for emergency responders.

Waves as high as 12 m (39.37 ft) were predicted to hit the north Queensland coast as the storm surge caused by Cyclone Yasi combined with a high tide of up to 7 m (23 ft) above average.

In Mission Beach near where Cyclone Yasi made landfall, wind gusts were estimated to have reached 290 km/h (180 mph), leaving behind much damage. A storm surge estimated to have reached 7 m (23 ft) destroyed several structures along the coast and pushed up to 300 m (980 ft) inland. In the hours after the storm's passage, police could not venture beyond their station grounds as the situation had yet to be declared safe. Most of the beach had lost its sand and every structure was damaged to some degree. Near sunrise on 3 February, there were no reports of fatalities or injuries in Mission Beach. As the eye of the storm moved over several towns in Queensland, news reporters took the opportunity to give brief damage assessments before the eyewall returned. The worst affected areas were around Tully, Tully Heads, Silkwood, Mission Beach, Innisfail and Cardwell.

According to residents in Tully, the town was "...a scene of mass devastation". An unknown number of homes were completely destroyed as intense winds, estimated at 209 km/h (130 mph), battered the area. Many other homes not destroyed sustained severe facade and or roof damage. As daybreak came, reports from the town stated that about 90% of the structures along the main avenue sustained extensive damage.

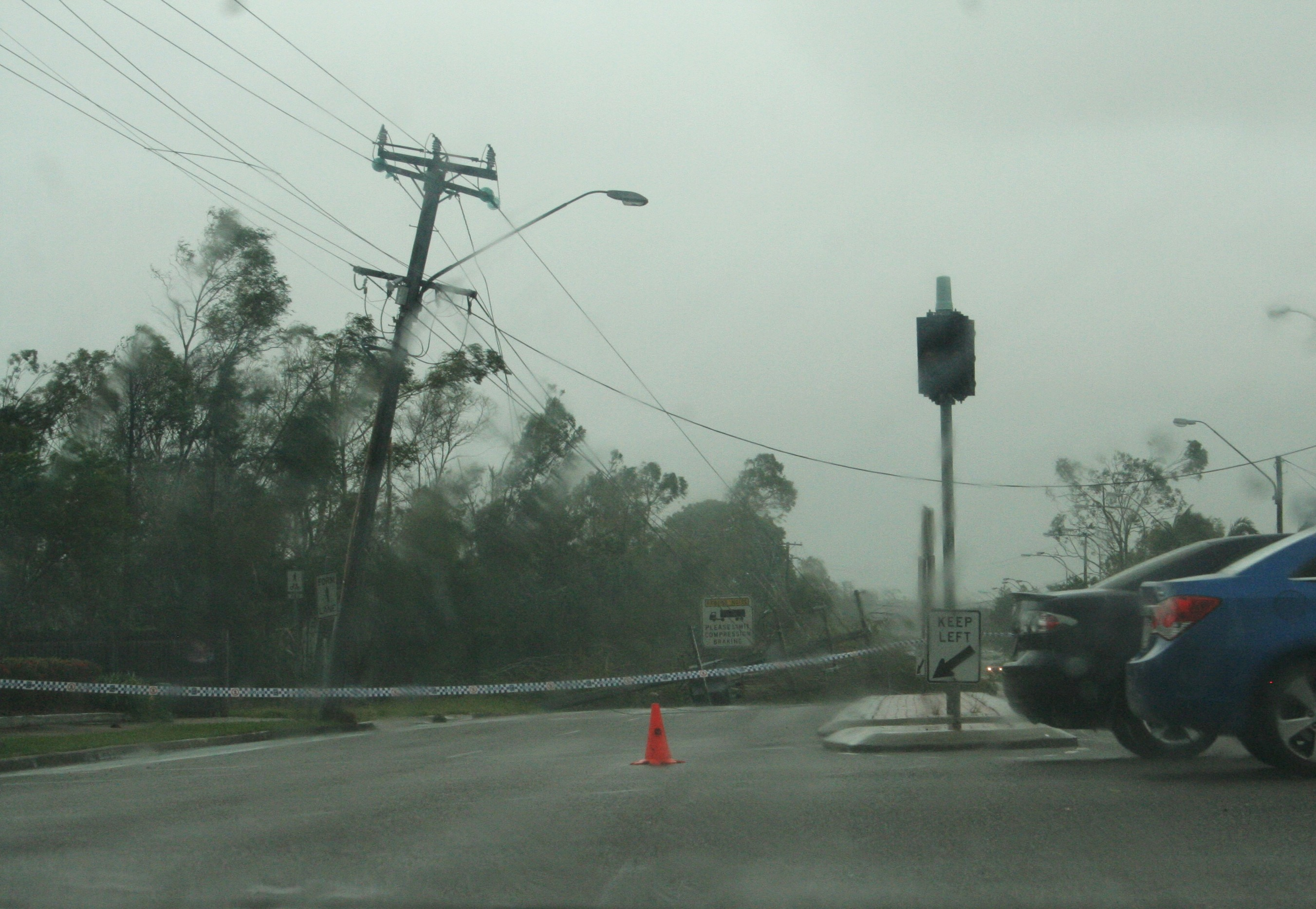
Downed power pole and lines on Kings Road in Townsville

An evacuation centre in Innisfail began to flood as the worst of Yasi's impacts neared. Evacuees were reportedly hammering boards at the bottom of doors to prevent water from further entering the structure. Additionally, concerns over the building's windows came about as they flexed amidst winds over 200 km/h (120 mph). In Townsville, numerous roofs were torn off buildings and sent hurtling down streets. Many windows are believed to have been broken as residents reported the sound of glass breaking throughout the night as the storm moved through. In Tully, the high school was destroyed and needed to be rebuilt.

Numerous emergency calls were made by residents trapped in their homes near the height of the storm. However, their calls could not be acted upon as conditions were too dangerous for police to travel in. One reported instance was of six people trapped in an apartment complex at Port Hinchinbrook near Cardwell, who could not be evacuated. The building was threatened by Yasi's storm surge which exceeded 3 m (9.8 ft). The group were later reported to be safe. Around 10:30 pm local time on 2 February, Premier Bligh stated that an estimated 90,000 structures, including evacuation centres, were without power. This figure rose to 170,000 by morning and officials stated that some residents may be without power for more than a month.

The water-supply system had failed in Townsville and there was only 24 hours supply, while the water had run out at Magnetic Island in one day.

Fears of total devastation to the banana and sugar cane crops arose as the storm struck land. Initial estimates stated that damage to sugar cane alone could reach A$505 million. On 3 February, total losses from the storm were estimated to reach A$3.5 billion (US$3.54 billion), this makes it the costliest cyclone to ever hit Australia (not accounting for inflation). By 5 February, A$2 billion (US$2.03 billion) was confirmed to have been lost in agriculture, mining and local government. An additional A$1 billion has been lost in the tourism industry.

One death was due to carbon monoxide poisoning by exhaust of a portable generator being used in a confined space at Bambaroo near Ingham.

Two days after landfall, severe flooding from the rains severed the Bruce Highway between Townsville and Ingham leaving a 10 kilometre backup of traffic. Many of those who evacuated the devastated areas including emergency workers were stranded.

On 5 February, the remnants of Yasi as a tropical low created torrential rain as rainfall of 140 mm (5.5 in) was recorded in Terowie and Yongala. Flooding was widespread in towns of northern South Australia reaching even Renmark on the River Murray. In north-west Victoria, Mildura recorded the highest daily rainfall total on record, with 142 mm (5.6 in) and Lyndhurst, a suburb of Melbourne recorded 180 mm (7.1 in) of rain in the 24 hours falling up to 9am AEDT (22:00 UTC) on 5 February.

On 6 February, the BOM reported that Ex-Tropical Cyclone Yasi was 85 km (53 mi) north of Yulara and that heavy rains continued in the Alice Springs area. The deluge also continued in northern South Australia as vast areas continued to get rain. Hallett had a record rainfall amount of 98 mm (3.9 in). Damaging winds with gusts of more than 90 km/h hit Marla and Coober Pedy. More than 100 mm (3.9 in) also fell at Arkaroola and Mt Dare, 92 mm (3.6 in) fell at Marree, and 86 mm (3.4 in) at Yunta.

Even one week after the flooding rains, areas that were affected had become completely isolated. At Challenger Gold Mine 150 people were isolated and emergency supplies had to be flown in. Cattle Stations near Oodnadatta, Glendambo and the world's largest at Anna Creek Station were all isolated.

The Australian Defence Force (ADF) response was designated Operation Yasi Assist. The ADF established Joint Task Force 664, based at Lavarack Barracks in Townsville and under the command of Brigadier Stuart Smith, for operational command on 2 February 2011.

=== Retirement ===
As a result of the storm's destruction it caused, the name Yasi was later retired by the FMS and will never will be used again for a South Pacific Tropical Cyclone it was replaced by Yvonne for future seasons.

== See also ==
- 2010–11 Queensland floods
- March 2010 Queensland floods

Related tropical cyclones

- List of Queensland tropical cyclones

- Cyclone Althea (1971) – struck north of Townsville and caused significant damage
- Cyclone Larry (2006) – the previous costliest cyclone to impact Australia, also affecting the same area as Yasi
- Cyclones Tasha (2010), Oswald (2013) and Jasper (2023) – all struck similar areas as Yasi as lower intensity systems but caused devastating flooding.
- Cyclone Ita (2014) – the next severe tropical cyclone to strike the north coast of Queensland.

- Cyclone Tracy (1974) – one of the most destructive cyclones in Australia, Tracy and Yasi are often used as benchmarks due to both systems causing similar amounts of damage despite their vastly differing sizes.
