= HMAS Paluma (A 01) =

Paluma-class survey motor launch of the Royal Australian Navy

History

Australia
- Namesake: Paluma, Queensland
- Builder: Eglo Engineering, Adelaide
- Laid down: 21 March 1988
- Launched: 6 February 1989
- Commissioned: 27 February 1989
- Decommissioned: 18 September 2021
- Home port: HMAS Cairns, Cairns
- Identification: IMO number: 8717295
- Motto: "Search With Diligence"
- Honours and awards: One inherited battle honour
- Status: in active service
- Badge

General characteristics
- Class & type: Paluma-class survey motor launch
- Displacement: 320 tonnes
- Length: 36.6 m (120 ft) length overall
- Beam: 13.7 m (45 ft)
- Draught: 1.9 m (6 ft 3 in)
- Propulsion: 2 Detroit V12 diesel engines
- Speed: 12 knots (22 km/h; 14 mph)
- Range: 1,800 nautical miles (3,300 km; 2,100 mi) at 10 knots (19 km/h; 12 mph)
- Endurance: 14 days
- Complement: 3 officers, 11 sailors (plus accommodation for 4 additional)
- Sensors & processing systems: Radar: Kelvin Hughes 1007 navigational radar; Sonars: Thales Petrel three-dimensional forward looking active high frequency MBES
- Armament: None fitted

HMAS Paluma (A 01) was the lead ship of the Paluma-class survey motor launches operated by the Royal Australian Navy (RAN).

== Design and construction ==
The Paluma-class vessels have a full load displacement of 320 tonnes. They are 36.6 metres (120 ft) long overall and 36 metres (118 ft) long between perpendiculars, have a beam of 13.7 metres (45 ft), and a draught of 1.9 metres (6 ft 3 in). Propulsion machinery consists of two General Motors Detroit Diesel 12V-92T engines, which supply 1,290 brake horsepower (960 kW) to the two propeller shafts. Each vessel has a top speed of 12 knots (22 km/h; 14 mph), a maximum sustainable speed of 10 knots (19 km/h; 12 mph) (which gives a maximum range of 1,800 nautical miles (3,300 km; 2,100 mi)), and an endurance of 14 days.

The sensor suite of a Paluma-class launch consists of a Kelvin Hughes 1007 navigational radar and Thales Petrel three-dimensional forward looking active high frequency echosounders. The vessels are unarmed. The standard ship's company consists of three officers and eleven sailors, although another four personnel can be accommodated. The catamarans were originally painted white, but were repainted naval grey in 2002.

Paluma was laid down by Eglo Engineering on 21 March 1988, launched on 6 February 1989 and commissioned into the RAN on 27 February 1989. The ship was named for Paluma, Queensland. She, along with sister ship HMAS Mermaid, was decommissioned on 18 September 2021.

== Operational history ==
In January 2011, Paluma was one of three RAN vessels deployed to survey Moreton Bay and the Brisbane River for submerged debris as part of Operation Queensland Flood Assist, the Australian Defence Force response to the 2010–11 Queensland floods.
