= Operation Queensland Flood Assist =

Military response to 2010–2011 Queensland floods

- Part of 2010–2011 Queensland floods
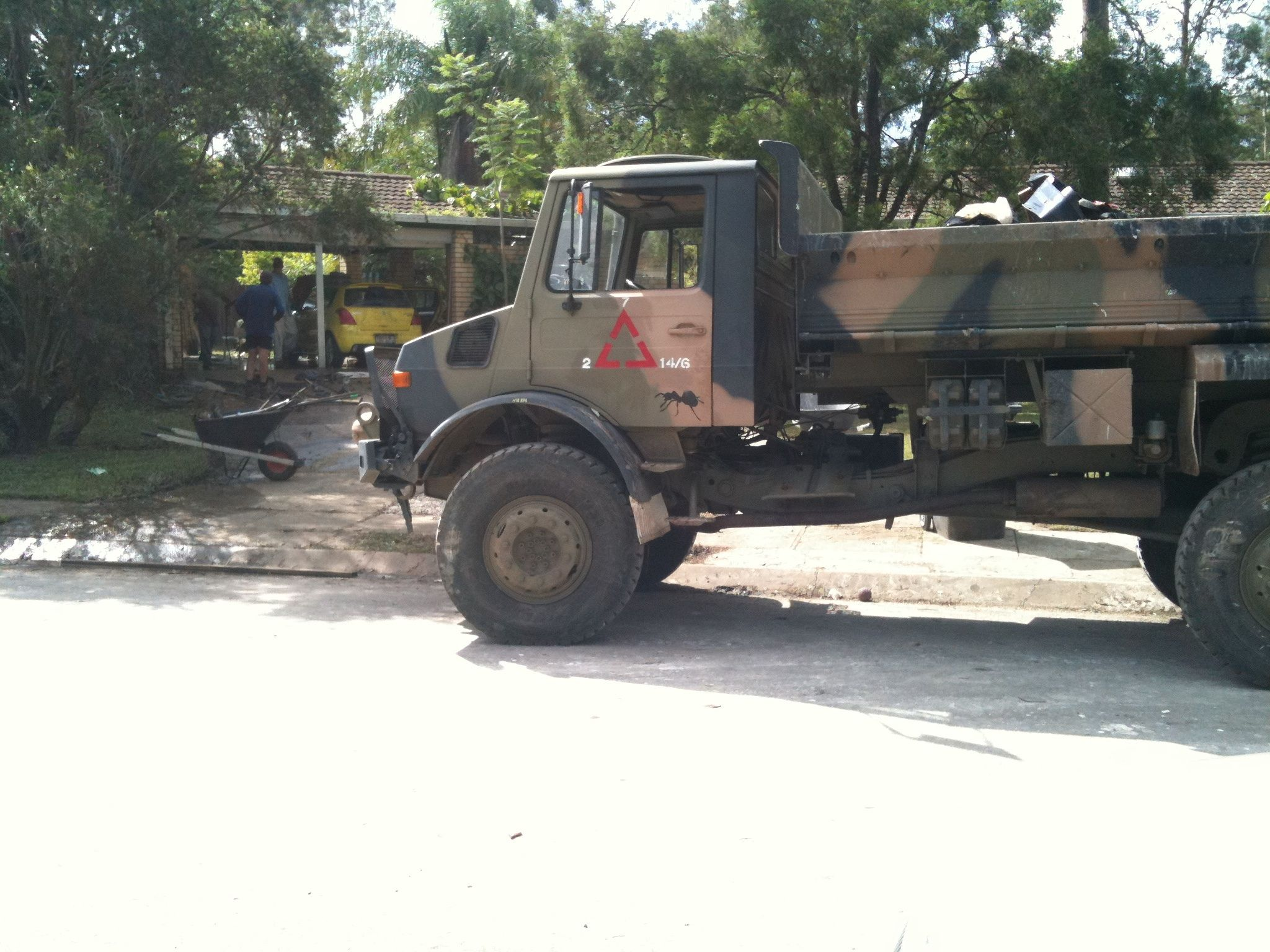
- An Australian Army truck assisting with the cleanup of a flood affected suburb of Brisbane
- Type: National emergency response contingency
- Location: Flood affected areas of Queensland
- Planned by: Emergency Management Australia (EMA)
- Target: Search & Rescue, evacuation, health management, airlift, provision of supplies, logistics operations, reestablishment of emergency communications, hydro-graphic survey, underwater clearance, recovery and reconstruction
- Objective: Flood relief
- Date: 1 January 2011 – 4 February 2011
- Executed by: Joint Task Force 637

Operation Queensland Flood Assist was a complex, multi-Service activity by the Australian Defence Force (ADF) as a contribution to the response to the 2010–2011 Queensland floods. Coordinated to aid civilian emergency response efforts, at Federal inter-departmental level it was managed by Emergency Management Australia. It comprised units and personnel from the Royal Australian Navy (RAN), Australian Army, and Royal Australian Air Force (RAAF) operating as Joint Task Force 637 (JTF 637). The operation was initially commanded by Colonel Luke Foster, based at Enoggera Barracks in Brisbane. When the ADF commitment was increased, command was transferred to Brigadier Paul McLachlan, Commander of the 7th Brigade, also based in Brisbane.

Task force activities were coordinated with the civilian Queensland Recovery and Reconstruction taskforce headed by Major-General Michael Slater.

== Activities ==
JTF 637 was established on 1 January 2011 to command the ADF units responding to the floods. At this time, these units included three Army Black Hawk helicopters, which were operating near the town of Emerald. Additional ADF units were assigned to the task force as the situation worsened, and by 14 January, the task force comprised:

- 540 personnel from all three services (including reservists and 150 personnel from Fleet Support Unit-Sydney)
- 3 RAAF Beechcraft Super King Air for personnel transport, supply tasking and aerial survey
- 2 RAAF C-130 Hercules for airlift support
- 2 RAAF C-17 Globemasters for airlift support
- 1 Army CH-47 Chinook helicopter for heavy lift support
- 9 Army Black Hawk helicopters for search and rescue, recovery and evacuations.
- 4 Army Kiowa observation helicopters for search and aerial survey
- 2 Army LARC amphibious watercraft for search and recovery
- 17 Army Bushmaster vehicles for search and recovery
- Army heavy transport vehicles
- 3 Navy Sea King helicopters for search and rescue and airlift support
- 4 Navy Augusta 109 helicopters for search and aerial survey
- Navy Hydrographic Survey force comprising HMAS Leeuwin, HMAS Paluma, HMAS Shepparton, Leeuwin's Survey Motor Boats (SMB) and the Deployable Geospatial Survey Team
- HMAS Huon to survey for submerged debris in Moreton Bay
- A Navy Clearance Diving to assess underwater hazards

On 13 January, ADF units assigned to JTF 637 were operating from Brisbane, Rockhampton, Townsville, RAAF Base Amberley, Roma, Theodore, St George and the Lockyer Valley.

On 14 January, Prime Minister Julia Gillard announced that the number of ADF personnel deployed would be increased to 1200, making it the largest deployment for a natural disaster since Cyclone Tracy in 1974. The additional deployment would include the 2nd Combat Engineer Regiment and a Navy minehunter.

By 18 January the number of defence personnel deployed had risen to 1600. On the same day, minehunter HMAS Huon and hydrographic survey ships HMAS Paluma and HMAS Shepparton commenced surveying Moreton Bay and the Brisbane River for submerged debris.

Search and recovery operations in the Lockyer Valley continued into late January 2011. Maritime survey of the Brisbane River and Moreton Bay shipping channels and cleanup in the Grantham and Lockyer Valley continued into February 2011.

JTF 637 was disestablished on 4 February, although Army engineers and Navy survey ships continued to provide support. Some of the assets were redeployed to Operation Yasi Assist.

== See also ==
- Operation Yasi Assist
