= HMAS Paluma =

Four Australian naval vessels have been named HMAS Paluma after an Aboriginal word meaning "thunder":

- HMQS Paluma was a gunboat built for the Queensland colonial navy in 1884. She was acquired by the Royal Australian Navy (RAN) in 1913, and was sold into civilian service in 1916.
- HMAS Paluma (1941), an auxiliary patrol boat built in 1941
- HMAS Paluma (1946), formerly Motor Stores Lighter No. 252 (MSL 252), was altered during construction into a survey ship, and completed in 1945
- HMAS Paluma (A 01), lead ship of the Paluma-class motor launches, built in 1989 and in service as of 2016

== Battle honours ==
Ships named HMAS Paluma are entitled to bear a single battle honour:

- New Guinea 1942–43
