= HMAS Shepparton =

Two ships of the Royal Australian Navy have been named HMAS Shepparton, after the city of Shepparton, Victoria.

- HMAS Shepparton (J248), a Bathurst-class corvette launched in 1942 and sold for scrap in 1958
- HMAS Shepparton (A 03), a Paluma-class survey vessel launched in 1989 and active as of 2016

== Battle honours ==
Ships named HMAS Shepparton are entitled to carry two battle honours:

- Pacific 1943
- New Guinea 1943–44
