= HMAS Mermaid =

1989 Paluma-class survey motor launch

History

Australia
- Builder: Eglo Engineering, Adelaide
- Laid down: 19 July 1988
- Launched: 28 September 1989
- Commissioned: 4 December 1989
- Decommissioned: 18 September 2021
- Home port: HMAS Cairns, Cairns
- Identification: MMSI number: 503152000
- Motto: "No Task Too Arduous"

General characteristics
- Class & type: Paluma-class survey motor launch
- Displacement: 320 tonnes
- Length: 36.6 m (120 ft) length overall
- Beam: 13.7 m (45 ft)
- Draught: 1.9 m (6 ft 3 in)
- Propulsion: 2 Detroit V12 diesel engines
- Speed: 12 knots (22 km/h; 14 mph)
- Range: 1,800 nautical miles (3,300 km; 2,100 mi) at 10 knots (19 km/h; 12 mph)
- Endurance: 14 days
- Complement: 3 officers, 11 sailors (plus accommodation for 4 additional)
- Sensors & processing systems: Radar: JRC JMA-3710-6 navigational radar; Sonars: ELAC LAZ 72 side-scan mapping sonar; Skipper 113 hull-mounted scanning sonar
- Armament: None fitted

HMAS Mermaid (A 02) is a Paluma-class survey motor launch serving in the Royal Australian Navy (RAN).

== Design and construction ==
The Paluma-class vessels have a full load displacement of 320 tonnes. They are 36.6 metres (120 ft) long overall and 36 metres (118 ft) long between perpendiculars, have a beam of 13.7 metres (45 ft), and a draught of 1.9 metres (6 ft 3 in). Propulsion machinery consists of two General Motors Detroit Diesel 12V-92T engines, which supply 1,290 brake horsepower (960 kW) to the two propeller shafts. Each vessel has a top speed of 12 knots (22 km/h; 14 mph), a maximum sustainable speed of 10 knots (19 km/h; 12 mph) (which gives a maximum range of 1,800 nautical miles (3,300 km; 2,100 mi)), and an endurance of 14 days.

The sensor suite of a Paluma-class launch consists of a JRC JMA-3710-6 navigational radar, an ELAC LAZ 72 side-scan mapping sonar, and a Skipper 113 hull-mounted scanning sonar. The vessels are unarmed. The standard ship's company consists of three officers and eleven sailors, although another four personnel can be accommodated. The catamarans were originally painted white, but were repainted naval grey in 2002.

Constructed by Eglo Engineering, Mermaid was laid down on 19 July 1988, launched on 28 September 1989, and commissioned into the RAN on 4 December 1989.
