= HMAS Shepparton (A 03) =

History

Australia
- Namesake: City of Shepparton, Victoria
- Builder: Eglo Engineering, Adelaide
- Laid down: 21 September 1998
- Launched: 5 December 1989
- Commissioned: 24 January 1990
- Decommissioned: 16 June 2023
- Home port: HMAS Cairns, Cairns
- Identification: MMSI number: 503153000; Callsign: VLRZ
- Motto: "By Wisdom And Courage"
- Honours and awards: Two inherited battle honours

General characteristics
- Class & type: Paluma-class survey motor launch
- Displacement: 320 tonnes
- Length: 36.6 m (120 ft) length overall
- Beam: 13.7 m (45 ft)
- Draught: 1.9 m (6 ft 3 in)
- Propulsion: 2 Detroit V12 diesel engines
- Speed: 12 knots (22 km/h; 14 mph)
- Range: 1,800 nautical miles (3,300 km; 2,100 mi) at 10 knots (19 km/h; 12 mph)
- Endurance: 14 days
- Complement: 3 officers, 11 sailors (plus accommodation for 4 additional)
- Sensors & processing systems: Radar: JRC JMA-3710-6 navigational radar; Sonars: ELAC LAZ 72 side-scan mapping sonar; Skipper 113 hull-mounted scanning sonar
- Armament: None fitted

HMAS Shepparton (A 03) is a Paluma-class survey motor launch of the Royal Australian Navy (RAN).

== Design and construction ==
The Paluma-class vessels have a full load displacement of 320 tonnes. They are 36.6 metres (120 ft) long overall and 36 metres (118 ft) long between perpendiculars, have a beam of 13.7 metres (45 ft), and a draught of 1.9 metres (6 ft 3 in). Propulsion machinery consists of two General Motors Detroit Diesel 12V-92T engines, which supply 1,290 brake horsepower (960 kW) to the two propeller shafts. Each vessel has a top speed of 12 knots (22 km/h; 14 mph), a maximum sustainable speed of 10 knots (19 km/h; 12 mph) (which gives a maximum range of 1,800 nautical miles (3,300 km; 2,100 mi)), and an endurance of 14 days.

The sensor suite of a Paluma-class launch consists of a JRC JMA-3710-6 navigational radar, an ELAC LAZ 72 side-scan mapping sonar, and a Skipper 113 hull-mounted scanning sonar. The vessels are unarmed. The standard ship's company consists of three officers and eleven sailors, although another four personnel can be accommodated. The catamarans were originally painted white, but were repainted naval grey in 2002.

Shepparton was laid down at Eglo Engineering's shipyard in Port Adelaide, South Australia on 21 September 1988, launched on 5 December 1989, and commissioned into the RAN on 24 January 1990. The ship was named for the city of Shepparton, Victoria.

== Operational history ==
In January 2011, Shepparton was one of three RAN vessels deployed to survey Moreton Bay and the Brisbane River for submerged debris as part of Operation Queensland Flood Assist, the Australian Defence Force response to the 2010–11 Queensland floods.

In October 2013, Shepparton participated in the International Fleet Review 2013 in Sydney.

On 16 June 2023, HMAS Shepparton and HMAS Benalla were decommissioned at HMAS Cairns, with the acceleration of the Defence Strategic Review released in May 2023.
