= Oosterschelde (ship) =

1918 Dutch three-masted schooner

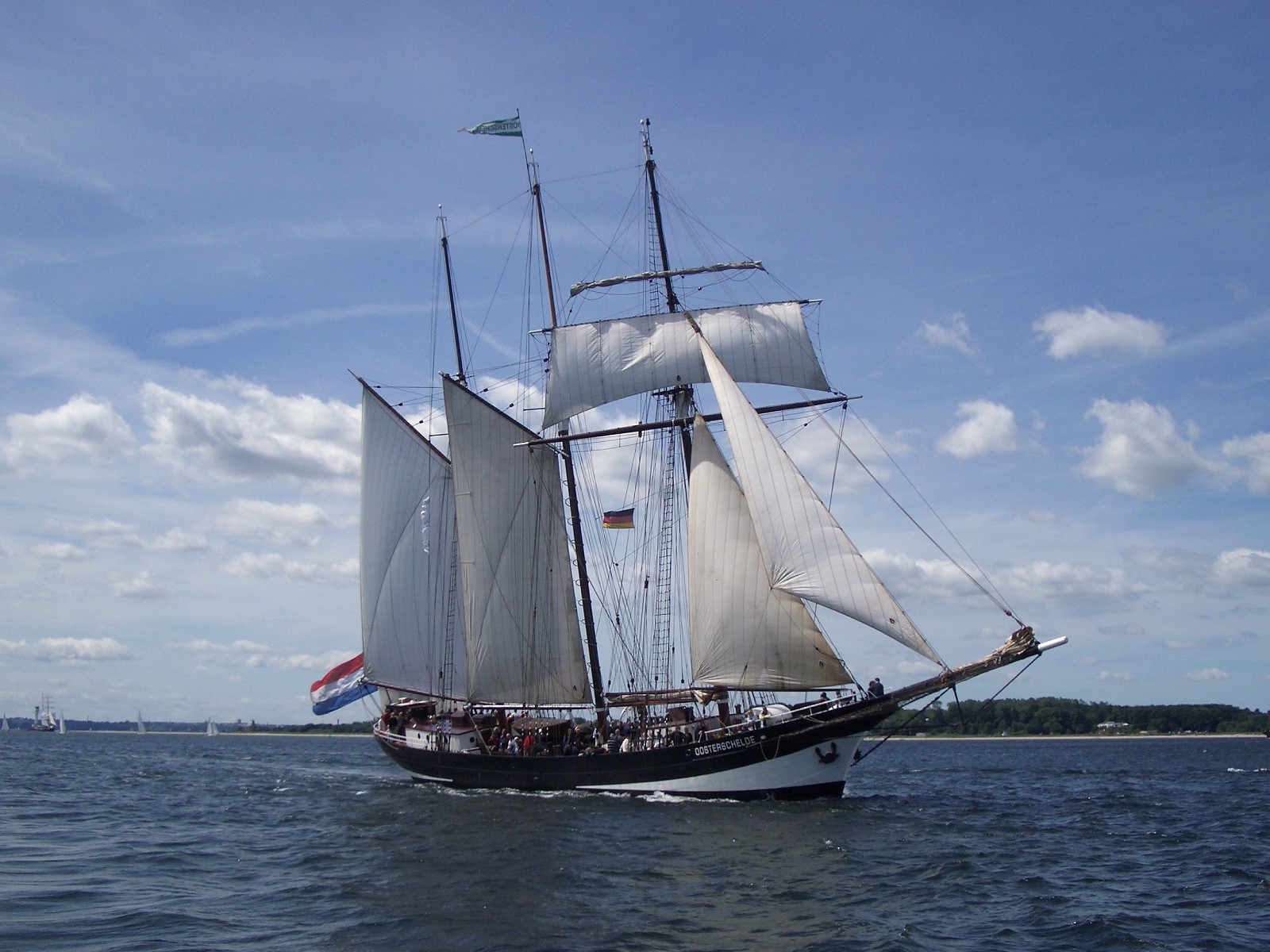

History

Netherlands
- Name: Oosterschelde
- Completed: 1918
- Identification: IMO number: 5347221; MMSI number: 246011000; Callsign: PGNP
- Status: Active

General characteristics
- Type: Topsail Schooner
- Tonnage: 370 tons
- Length: 50 metres (160 ft)
- Beam: 7.5 metres (25 ft)
- Height: 34.5 metres (113 ft)
- Depth: 2.95 metres (9 ft 8 in)
- Installed power: John Deere 6 cylinder, 500 hp
- Sail plan: Topsail schooner, 891 square metres (9,590 sq ft) sail area
- Capacity: Room for 24 embarked passengers, up to 120 passengers on daytrips
- Crew: 4 to 8

Oosterschelde is a three-masted topsail schooner from the Netherlands, built in 1918. She is the largest restored Dutch freightship and the only remaining Dutch three-masted topsail schooner. Her home port is Rotterdam.

As a freighter with a deadweight of 400 tons, she transported mainly clay, stone and wood, but also herring, bran, potatoes, straw and bananas. In the 1930s, a heavier diesel engine was installed and some sail-rigging was removed (including the aft mast). In 1939, she was sold to a Danish shipping company and, rebaptised Fuglen II, became one of the most modern ships in the Danish fleet. In 1954, she was sold to a Swede, renamed Sylvan and thoroughly rebuilt to a modern motorised coaster.

In 1988, she was brought back to the Netherlands. She had always been maintained well, but restoration to the original state turned out too expensive for private funding. So a foundation collected money from various sources, partly by selling shares in the ship. Restoration lasted from 1990 to 1992, with the help of her last Dutch captain, Jan Kramer, and three maritime museums to ensure authenticity.

From 1996 through 1998 she made a trip around the world (route: Red Sea, Indonesia, Hong Kong, Japan, Australia, New-Zealand, Cape Horn, Antarctic, Açores). Maintenance is paid for through paying passengers and company presentations. A new voyage around the world started on 3 November 2012 and ended in May 2014. This brought the ship to Cabo Verde, Brazil, Cape Of Good Hope, Mauritius, Cape Leeuwin, New Zealand, Cape Horn and Antarctica.

In October 2013 Oosterschelde participated in the International Fleet Review 2013 in Sydney, Australia.

A further trip around the world, following the same route as the Beagle with Charles Darwin, culminated in Falmouth in July 2025.

== See also ==
- List of schooners
