= HMAS Benalla (A 04) =

1990 Survey ship

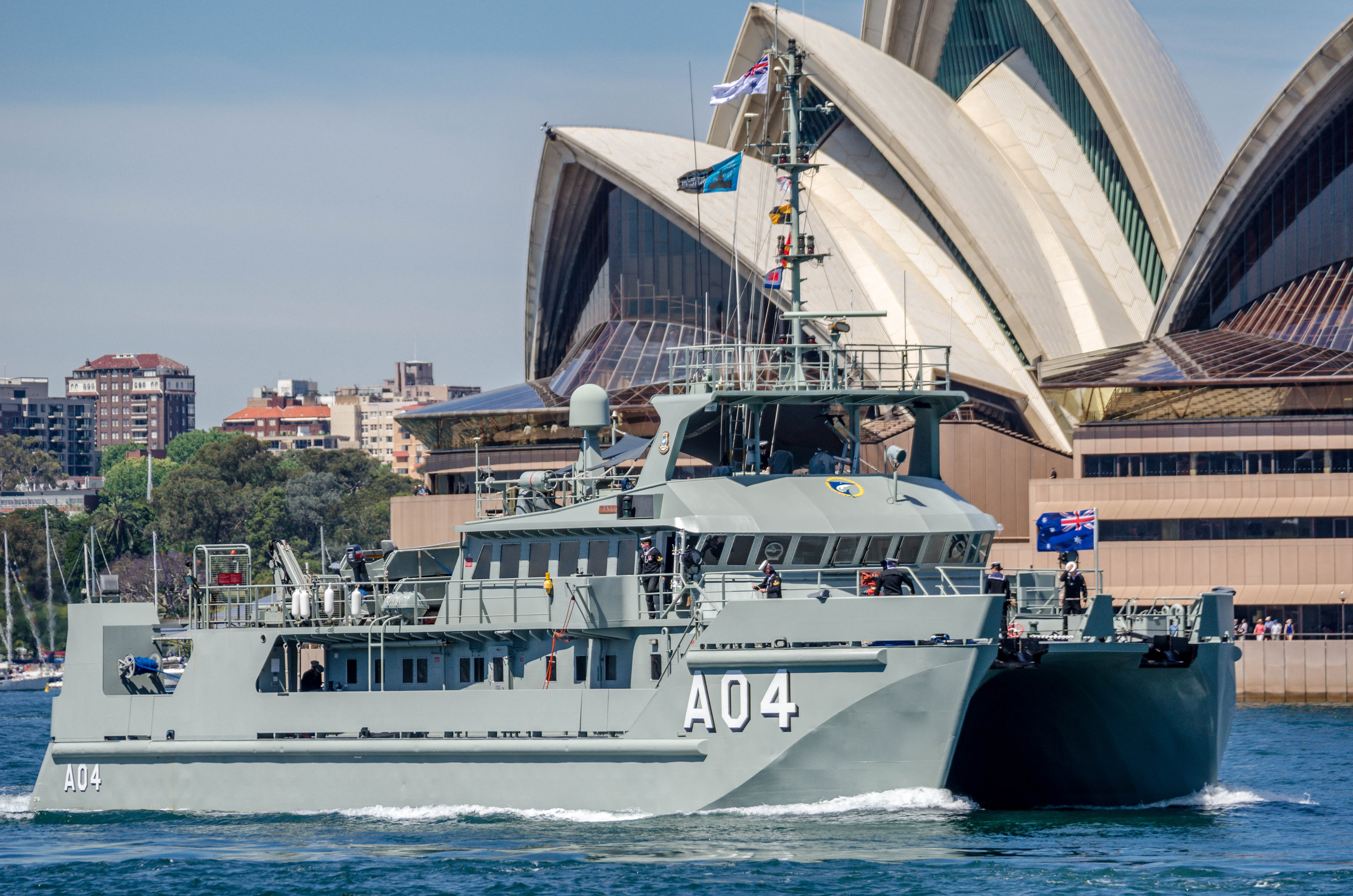
- HMAS Benalla during the International Fleet Review 2013

History

Australia
- Namesake: City of Benalla, Victoria
- Builder: Eglo Engineering, Adelaide
- Laid down: 25 November 1988
- Launched: 31 January 1990
- Commissioned: 20 March 1990
- Decommissioned: 16 June 2023
- Home port: HMAS Cairns
- Identification: MMSI number: 503154000; Callsign: VLRW
- Motto: "We Lead Others Follow"
- Honours and awards: One inherited battle honour
- Badge

General characteristics
- Class & type: Paluma-class survey motor launch
- Displacement: 320 tonnes
- Length: 36.6 m (120 ft) length overall
- Beam: 13.7 m (45 ft)
- Draught: 1.9 m (6 ft 3 in)
- Propulsion: 2 Detroit V12 diesel engines
- Speed: 12 knots (22 km/h; 14 mph)
- Range: 1,800 nautical miles (3,300 km; 2,100 mi) at 10 knots (19 km/h; 12 mph)
- Endurance: 14 days
- Complement: 3 officers, 11 sailors (plus accommodation for 4 additional)
- Sensors & processing systems: Radar: JRC JMA-3710-6 navigational radar; Sonars: ELAC LAZ 72 side-scan mapping sonar; Skipper 113 hull-mounted scanning sonar

HMAS Benalla (A 04) is a Paluma-class survey motor launch of the Royal Australian Navy (RAN).

== Design and construction ==
The Paluma-class vessels have a full load displacement of 320 tonnes. They are 36.6 metres (120 ft) long overall and 36 metres (118 ft) long between perpendiculars, have a beam of 13.7 metres (45 ft), and a draught of 1.9 metres (6 ft 3 in). Propulsion machinery consists of two General Motors Detroit Diesel 12V-92T engines, which supply 1,290 brake horsepower (960 kW) to the two propeller shafts. Each vessel has a top speed of 12 knots (22 km/h; 14 mph), a maximum sustainable speed of 10 knots (19 km/h; 12 mph) (which gives a maximum range of 1,800 nautical miles (3,300 km; 2,100 mi)), and an endurance of 14 days.

The sensor suite of a Paluma-class launch consists of a JRC JMA-3710-6 navigational radar, an ELAC LAZ 72 side-scan mapping sonar, and a Skipper 113 hull-mounted scanning sonar. The vessels are unarmed. The standard ship's company consists of three officers and eleven sailors, although another four personnel can be accommodated. The catamarans were originally painted white, but were repainted naval grey in 2002.

Benalla was laid down by Eglo Engineering, on 25 November 1988, was launched on 31 January 1990, and commissioned into the RAN on 20 March 1990. The ship was named for the city of Benalla, Victoria.

== Operational history ==
In October 2013, Benalla participated in the International Fleet Review 2013 in Sydney.

HMAS Benalla, along with HMAS Shepparton were decommissioned at HMAS Cairns on 16 June 2023, with the acceleration of the Defence Strategic Review released in May 2023.
