= Paluma-class motor launch =

Australian hydrographic vessels

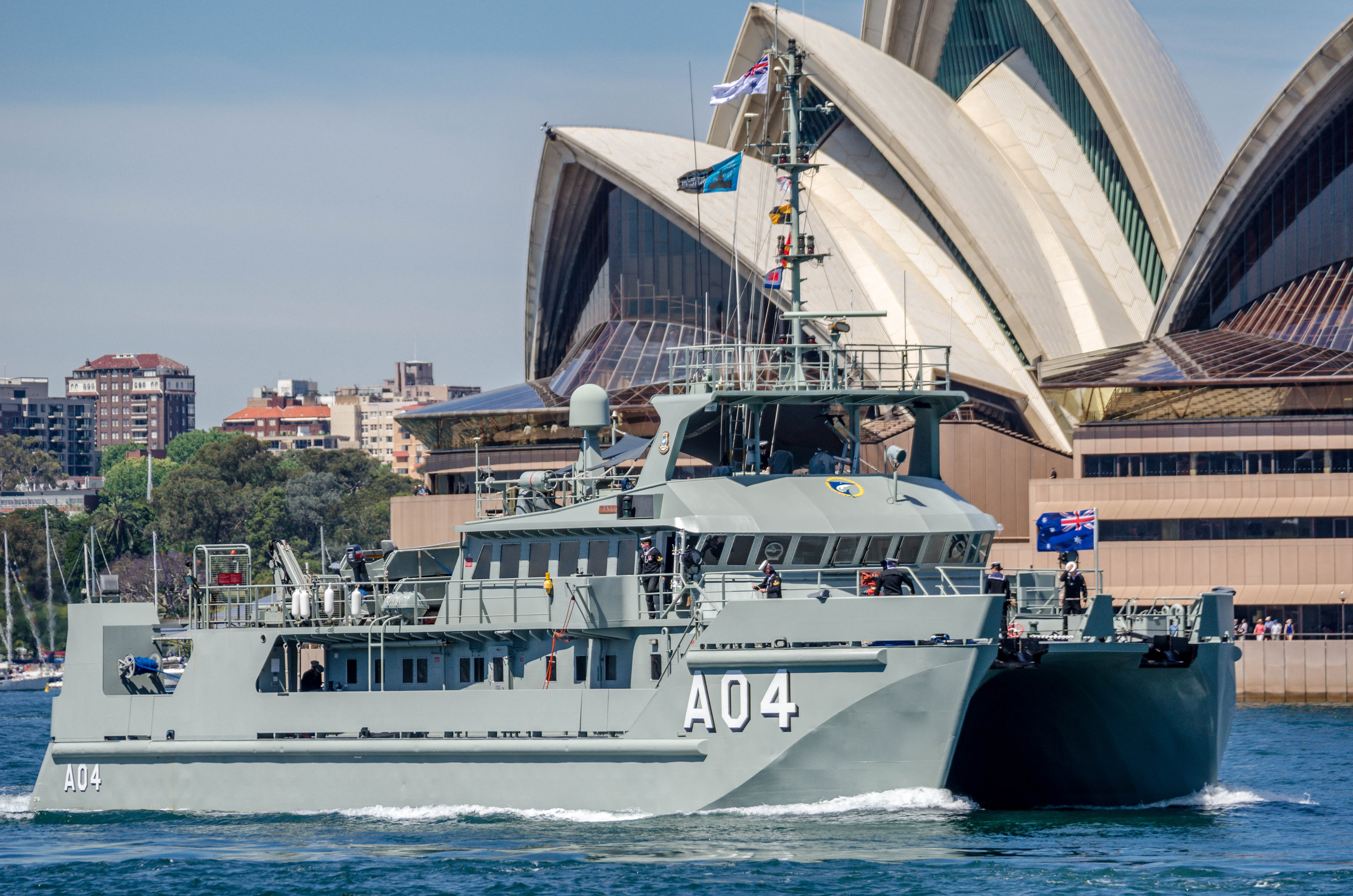
- HMAS Benalla on Sydney Harbour in October 2013

Class overview
- Name: Paluma
- Builders: Eglo Engineering, Adelaide
- Operators: Royal Australian Navy
- In service: March 1988 – March 1990
- In commission: February 1989 – June 2023
- Completed: 4
- Retired: 4

General characteristics
- Type: Motor launch
- Displacement: 320 tonnes
- Length: 36.6 m (120 ft) length overall
- Beam: 13.7 m (45 ft)
- Draught: 1.9 m (6 ft 3 in)
- Propulsion: 2 Detroit V12 diesel engines
- Speed: 12 knots (22 km/h; 14 mph)
- Range: 1,800 nautical miles (3,300 km; 2,100 mi) at 10 knots (19 km/h; 12 mph)
- Endurance: 14 days
- Complement: 3 officers, 11 sailors (plus accommodation for 4 additional)
- Sensors & processing systems: Radar: JRC JMA-3710-6 navigational radar; Sonars: ELAC LAZ 72 side-scan mapping sonar; Skipper 113 hull-mounted scanning sonar
- Armament: None fitted

The Paluma-class motor launch was a class of four hydrographic survey motor launches operated by the Royal Australian Navy (RAN). Built in Port Adelaide between 1988 and 1990, the four catamarans were primarily based at HMAS Cairns in Cairns, Queensland, and operated in pairs to survey the waters of northern Australia.

== Design and construction ==
The Paluma-class vessels are based on the design of the Prince-class roll-on/roll-off ferry. They have a full load displacement of 320 tonnes, are 36.6 metres (120 ft) long overall and 36 metres (118 ft) long between perpendiculars, have a beam of 13.7 metres (45 ft), and a draught of 1.9 metres (6 ft 3 in). Propulsion machinery consists of two General Motors Detroit Diesel 12V-92T engines, which supply 1,290 brake horsepower (960 kW) to the two propeller shafts. Each vessel has a top speed of 12 knots (22 km/h; 14 mph), a maximum sustainable speed of 10 knots (19 km/h; 12 mph) for a range of 1,800 nautical miles (3,300 km; 2,100 mi), and an endurance of 14 days.

The sensor suite of a Paluma-class launch consists of a JRC JMA-3710-6 navigational radar, an ELAC LAZ 72 side-scan mapping sonar, and a Skipper 113 hull-mounted scanning sonar. The vessels are unarmed. The standard ship's company consists of three officers and eleven sailors, although another four personnel can be accommodated. The catamarans were originally painted white, but were repainted naval grey in 2002.

The four ships were built by Eglo Engineering, at their shipyard in Port Adelaide, South Australia. The first, HMAS Paluma, was laid down in March 1988, and commissioned into the RAN in February 1989. All four ships were under construction by November 1988, and the last, HMAS Benalla, commissioned in March 1990.

== Operations ==
All four vessels were homeported at HMAS Cairns in Cairns, Queensland. They were used for hydrographic surveys of the shallow waters around northern Australia, primarily in the Great Barrier Reef. The vessels generally operated in pairs.

== Ships ==
Name	Pennant number	Builder	Laid down	Launched	Commissioned	Decommissioned	Status
Paluma	A01	Eglo Engineering, Adelaide	21 March 1988	6 February 1989	27 February 1989	18 September 2021	Retired
Mermaid	A02	Eglo Engineering, Adelaide	19 July 1988	28 September 1989	4 December 1989	18 September 2021	Retired
Shepparton	A03	Eglo Engineering, Adelaide	21 September 1988	5 December 1989	24 January 1990	16 June 2023	Retired
Benalla	A04	Eglo Engineering, Adelaide	25 November 1988	31 January 1990	20 March 1990	16 June 2023	Retired

== Replacement ==
Defending Australia in the Asia Pacific Century: Force 2030, the 2009 Department of Defence white paper, proposed replacing the Palumas, along with the RAN's patrol and mine warfare vessels, with a single class of multi-role offshore combatant vessels (OCVs). The new vessels, which could displace up to 2,000 tonnes and be equipped for helicopter or unmanned aerial vehicle operations, will use a modular mission payload system to change between roles as required.

Although the 2013 White Paper committed to the OCV as a long-term plan, it announced that life-extending upgrades to the Palumas would be sought as a short-term solution.
