= History of Portsmouth =

Portsmouth is an island port city situated on Portsea Island in the county of Hampshire, England. Its history has been influenced by its association with the sea, and its proximity to London, and mainland Europe.

== Roman ==
Portus Adurni which later became known as Portchester Castle, was one of the Saxon Shore forts and was a major base of the Classis Britannica and possibly its Headquarters.

== Pre-Norman ==
Although there have been settlements in the area since before Roman times, mostly being offshoots of Portchester, Portsmouth is commonly regarded as having been founded in 1180 by John of Gisors (Jean de Gisors). Most early records of Portsmouth are thought to have been destroyed by Norman invaders following the Norman Conquest. The earliest detailed references to Portsmouth can be found in the Southwick Cartularies.

However, the Oxford Dictionary of British Place Names gives the Anglo-Saxon name "Portesmūða" as late as the 9th century, meaning "mouth [of the harbour called] Portus" (from Latin). In Anglo-Saxon times a folk etymology "[harbour] mouth belonging to a man called Port" arose, which caused a statement in the Anglo-Saxon Chronicle that in 501 AD "Port and his 2 sons, Bieda and Mægla, came with 2 ships to Britain at the place which is called Portsmouth". It has been suggested that this is more likely to refer to the area around Portchester.

== Medieval ==
=== Norman ===
In the Domesday Book there is no mention of Portsmouth. However, settlements that later went on to form part of Portsmouth are listed. These are Buckland, Copnor, Fratton on Portsea Island and Cosham, Wymering and Drayton on the mainland. At this time it is estimated the Portsmouth area had a population not greater than two or three hundred.

While in the primary diocese of Portsea there was a small church prior to 1166 (now St Mary's in Fratton) Portsmouth's first real church came into being in 1181 when John of Gisors granted an acre (4,000 m^{2}) of land to Augustinian monks at the Southwick Priory to build a chapel dedicated to Thomas Becket. This chapel continued to be run by the monks of Southwick Priory until the Reformation after which its possession was transferred to Winchester College. The modern Portsmouth Anglican Cathedral is built on the original location of the chapel. The original grant referred to the area as Sudewde however a later grant a few years later used the name Portsmouth.

=== Growth of the city ===
In 1194, after he returned from being held captive by Duke Leopold V of Austria, King Richard I (The Lionheart) set about summoning a fleet and an army to Portsmouth, which he had taken over from John of Gisors. On 2 May 1194 the king gave Portsmouth its first royal charter granting permission for the city to hold a fifteen-day annual fair (which became known as the Free Market Fair), weekly markets (on Thursdays), to set up a local court to deal with minor matters, and exemption from paying the annual tax ("farm") of £18 a year—instead the money would be used for local matters. The actual physical charter was handed over by the Bishop of Ely William de Longchamps. The present location of the charter is currently unknown but its text survives, as when later royal charters were granted to the city reaffirming and extending its privileges large parts of the original charter were quoted verbatim.

As a crescent and an eight-point star (as appear on the city's coat of arms) were to be found on both the seals of King Richard and William de Longchamps it is commonly thought that this may have been the source of them, although there is no known documentary evidence for this.

King Richard later went on to build a number of houses and a hall in Portsmouth. The hall is thought to have been at the current location of the Clarence Barracks (the area was previously known as Kingshall Green).

In 1200 King John issued another charter to Portsmouth reaffirming the rights and privileges awarded by King Richard. Acquiring this second charter cost Portsmouth ten marks and a type of riding horse known as a Palfrey. King John's desire to invade Normandy resulted in the establishment of Portsmouth as a permanent naval base.

In 1212 William of Wrotham (Archdeacon of Taunton, Keeper of the King's Ships) started constructing the first docks of Portsmouth. At about the same time Pierre des Roches, Bishop of Winchester, founded Domus Dei (Hospital of St Nicholas) which performed its duties as an almshouse and hospice until 1540 when like other religious buildings it was seized by King Henry VIII.

During the 13th century, Portsmouth was commonly used by King Henry III and Edward I as a base for attacks against France.

In 1265, the city was on the receiving end of a serious raid by the Barons of the Cinque Ports. After scattering the defenders, they seized various ships and cargo and burned the town.

By the 14th century, commercial interests had grown considerably, despite rivalry with the dockyard of nearby Southampton. Common imports included wool, grain, wheat, woad, wax and iron, however the port's largest trade was in wine from Bayonne and Bordeaux.

=== 14th century ===
In 1313, the town received a charter from Edward II. This is the oldest of the city's charters that is known to have survived.

In 1338, a French fleet led by Nicholas Béhuchet arrived at Portsmouth docks flying English flags before anyone realised that they were a hostile force. The French burned down most of the buildings in the town; only the local church and Domus Dei survived. The population was subjected to rape and slaughter. As a result of this, King Edward III gave the remaining townsfolk exemption from national taxes so that they could afford to rebuild the town.

Only ten years after this devastation, the town for the first time was struck by the plague known as the Black Death. In order to prevent the regrowth of Portsmouth as a threat, the French again sacked the city in 1369, 1377 and 1380.

=== 15th century ===
In 1418, King Henry V ordered a wooden Round Tower be built at the mouth of the harbour, which was completed in 1426.

In 1450, Adam Moleyns Bishop of Chichester was murdered while in Portsmouth.

== Tudor period ==
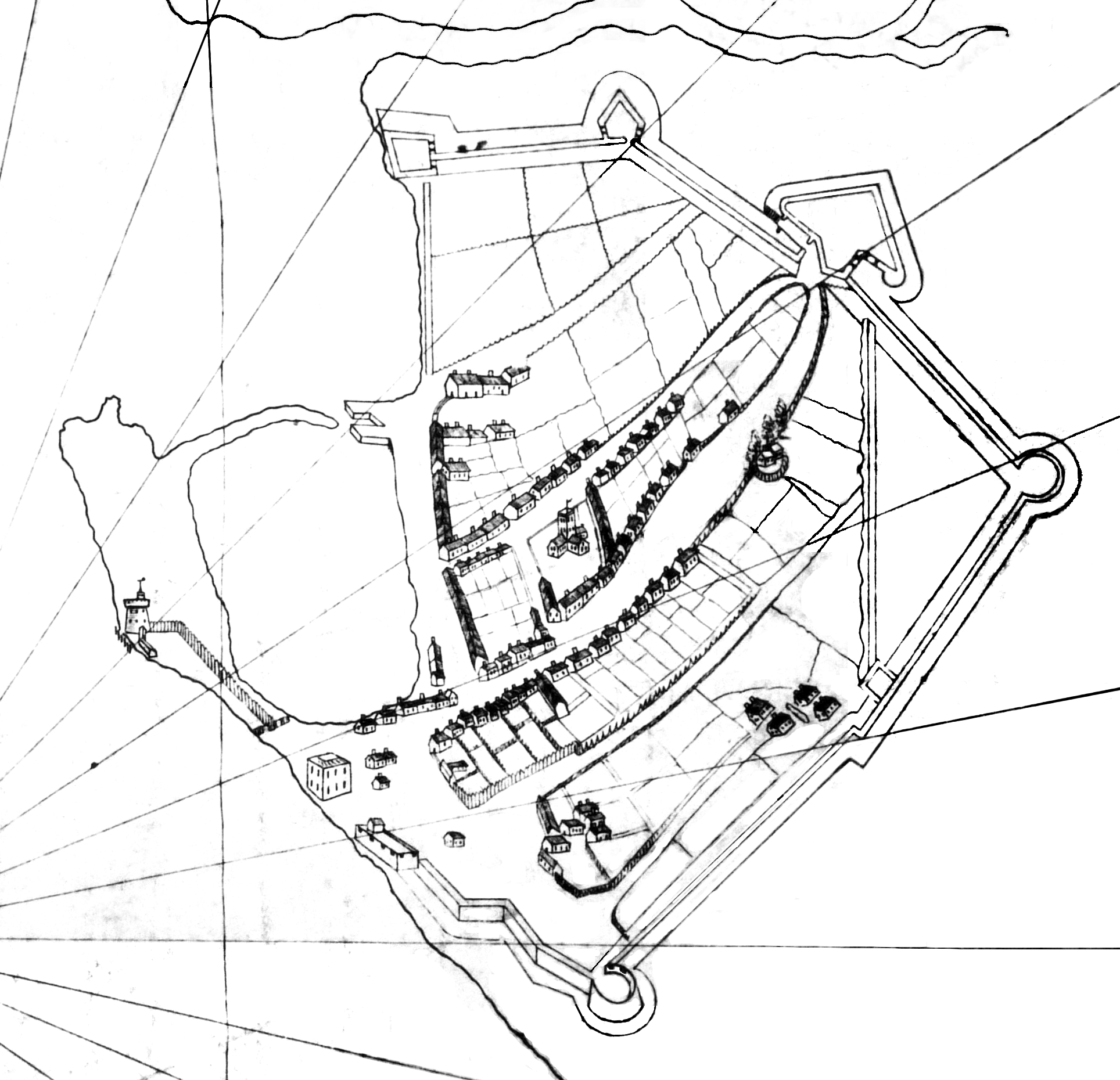
Portsmouth in the early Tudor period

Through the Tudor period, Portsmouth's fortification's were subject to almost continuous reworking. Under King Henry VIII the Round Tower was rebuilt out of stone and a Square Tower was raised. It was at this time that Robert Brygandine and Sir Reginald Bray, with the support of the king, commenced the building in Portsmouth of the country's first dry dock. In 1527 with some of the money obtained from the dissolution of the monasteries Henry VIII built the fort which became known as Southsea Castle. In 1545, he saw his vice-flagship Mary Rose founder off Southsea Castle, with a loss of about 500 lives, while going into action against the French fleet. It was during the Tudor period that the town gained its first military governor. The role of managing military operations in Portsmouth had previously been the duty of the constable of Portchester Castle.

In 1563, the city was struck by a plague that killed around 300 people.

It was also in the Tudor period that two mills were built at the end of the creek just above the town. The creek later developed into the body of water known as the mill pond.

== Stuart period ==
During the English Civil War, the city was initially held by the royalist faction before falling to parliament after the Siege of Portsmouth in September 1642.

In 1665, Charles II of England ordered Bernard de Gomme to begin the reconstruction of Portsmouth's fortifications a process which was to take many years.

Portsmouth's overland links to London started to be improved with an early turnpike trust being set up to improve the road where it passed Butser Hill.

In 1714, the crown purchased the two mills at the entrance to the millpond.

== 18th century ==
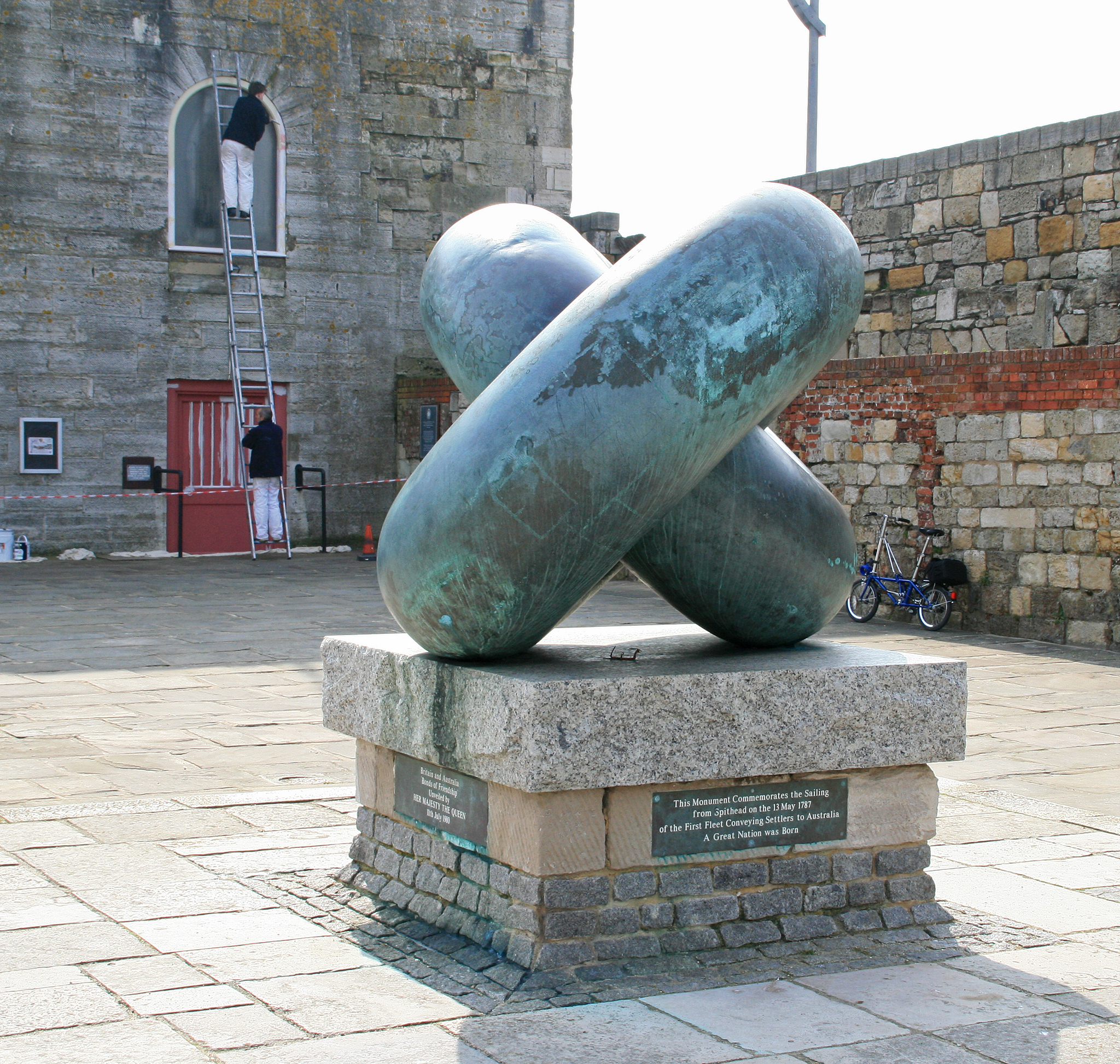
The First Fleet memorial in Portsmouth.

The first local newspaper in the city was the Portsmouth and Gosport Gazette. First published in 1745 it continued to publish until around 1790. There was then a 3-year gap before foundation of The Portsmouth Gazette and Weekly Advertiser. The final newspaper to begin publication in the 18th century was the Portsmouth Telegraph; or, Mottley's Naval and Military Journal which was first published in 1799.

In 1774, the two mills at the entrance to the millpond were rebuilt as one mill known as the Kings's mill.

On 13 May 1787 the First Fleet of ships left Portsmouth Harbour bound for Australia, taking the first British settlers there. They would arrive in Botany Bay on 18 January 1788. A memorial, officially unveiled by HM The Queen on 11 July 1980, commemorates the First Fleet, with a similar memorial in Sydney, New South Wales.

== Modern ==
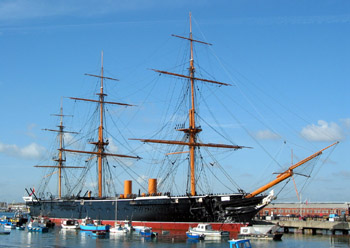
HMS Warrior

=== 19th century ===
==== Naval ====
Admiral Nelson left Portsmouth for the final time in 1805 to command the fleet that would defeat the larger Franco-Spanish fleet at Trafalgar. The Royal Navy's reliance on Portsmouth led to the city becoming the most fortified in Europe, with a network of forts circling the city.

From 1808, the Royal Navy's West Africa Squadron, who were tasked to stop the slave trade, operated out of Portsmouth.

The King's mill burned down in 1868 and over the next decade land was reclaimed from the millpond until it ceased to exist.

==== Transport ====
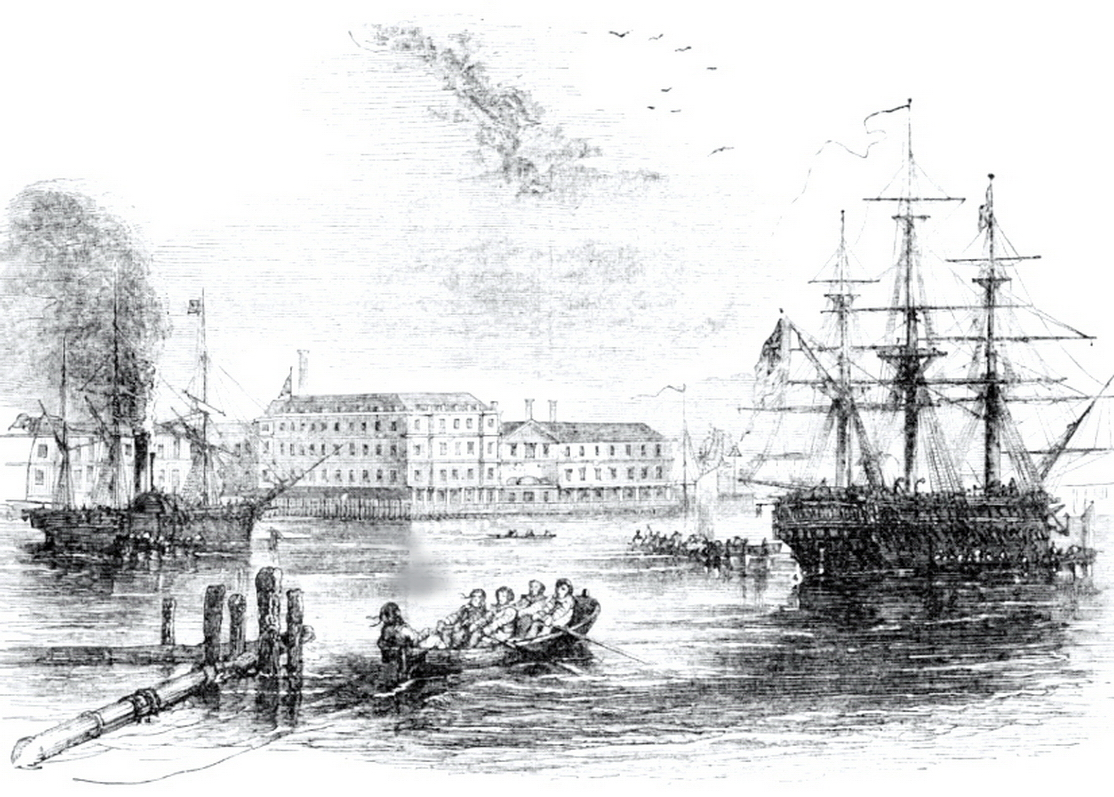
View of Portsmouth harbour near 1860

New transport links were constructed during this century. In 1823, the Portsmouth and Arundel Canal, along with the Wey and Arun Canal, provided an inland waterway route to London. This did not last long, with parts of the Portsmouth and Arundel Canal being closed after just 4 years. Portsmouth gained its first railway link in 1847, with a direct route to London arriving in 1859.

==== Media ====
In 1802, The Portsmouth Gazette and Weekly Advertiser was purchased by the Portsmouth Telegraph and ceased publication. The Portsmouth Telegraph then went through 3 rapid name changes, before settling on the Hampshire Telegraph and Sussex Chronicle. In 1850, the Portsmouth Times and Naval Gazette (often known simply as the Portsmouth Times) began publication. The Evening News began publication in 1877 and came under common ownership with the Hampshire Telegraph in 1883. In 1884, the Portsmouth Times gained a sister paper called the Evening Mail, which was later renamed the Southern Daily Mail.

==== Education and science ====
On 21 December 1872, a major scientific expedition, the Challenger Expedition, was launched from Portsmouth.

While an extensive number of subscription libraries were formed in Portsmouth in the early part of the 19th century, Portsmouth trailed many other cities in the provision of public libraries, with the first not being opened until 1884.

==== Battle of Southsea ====
In August 1874, a series of riots broke out over access to a section of Southsea beach. Lasting over 4 days, this became known as the "Battle of Southsea". The Riot Act was eventually invoked with soldiers from the 9th Regiment dispersing the crowd from Southsea Common.

=== 20th century ===
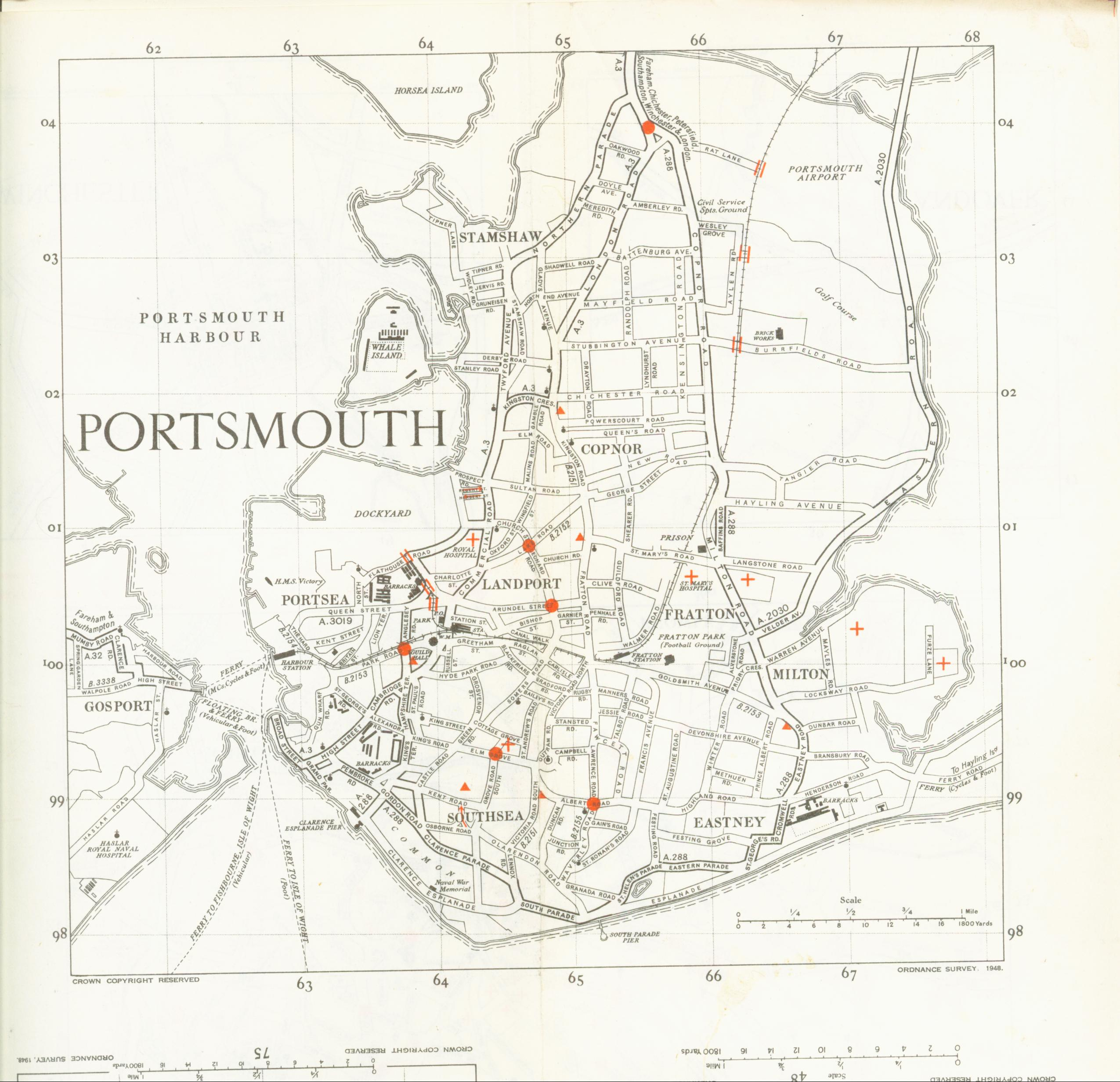
A partial roadmap of part of Portsmouth in 1948

Gosport in 1960

The city in the form of Portsmouth Corporation Transport purchased the private horse-drawn tram lines in 1901. The Connaught Drill Hall was opened by Lord Northbrook in March 1901.

In 1904, the boundaries of Portsmouth were extended to finally include the whole of Portsea Island. The boundaries were further extended in 1920 and 1932, taking in areas of the mainland.

In 1916, the city experienced its first aerial bombardment when a Zeppelin airship bombed it during the First World War.

Council housing was built on a large scale from the 1920s onwards, with families from inner city slums being rehoused on new estates including Paulsgrove, mostly in the north of Portsmouth.

Portsmouth was elevated from Town to City status on 21 April 1926.

==== The Portsmouth Blitz ====
As a major Royal Navy Dockyard, the Portsmouth Royal Naval Dockyard and surrounding city were bombed extensively during the Second World War. Nazi German Luftwaffe night-time air raids began on 24 August 1940 when 1,320 high explosive bombs and 38,000 incendiary devices were dropped on the city, damaging 30 churches, eight schools, one hospital and over 80,000 homes. 930 people were killed and 1,216 people were injured. Public buildings, such as the Southsea Baths and Assembly Rooms, located adjacent to Clarence Pier were so extensively damaged they would be demolished after the war. One especially damaging raid occurred on the night of 10 January 1941 in which the Guildhall was partial destroyed by bombing and 172 people were killed.

The extensive bombing of housing in Portsmouth resulted in even greater need for new private and council housing in the city. While most of the city has since been rebuilt, to this day developers still occasionally find unexploded bombs.

==== D-Day ====
Southsea beach and Portsmouth Harbour were military embarkation points for the D-Day landings on 6 June 1944. Southwick House, in Southwick five miles to the north of Portsmouth, had been chosen as the headquarters for the Supreme Allied Commander, US General Dwight D. Eisenhower, during D-Day.

==== Return of Lively Lady ====
On 4 July 1968, an estimated 250,000 people witnessed the return of Alec Rose, a greengrocer in Osborne Road, after he completed his single-handed circumnavigation in Lively Lady; he was knighted immediately and made Freeman of the City of Portsmouth. 400 motor-boats, yachts, catamarans and canoes welcomed him into harbour.

==== The University of Portsmouth ====
The University of Portsmouth gained university status in 1992, having held polytechnic status since 1969.

=== 21st century ===
In 2003 erection was started of a 552 feet high Spinnaker Tower sited at Portsmouth Harbour, and celebrating the city's maritime tradition. Completed in 2005, the tower has twin concrete legs meeting at half height to form a single column from which steel sails are mounted; an observation deck at the top provides a view of the city and harbour for tourists.

In late 2004, the Tricorn Centre, dubbed "The ugliest building in the UK" was finally demolished after years of delay and wrangling over the cost of doing so, and controversy as to whether it was worth preserving as an example of 1960s Brutalist architecture.

In 2005, Portsmouth was a focus for Sea Britain, a series of events to mark the 200th anniversary (bicentenary) of Lord Nelson's victory at the Battle of Trafalgar. In particular, in June, there was the massive Fleet Review, by HM Queen Elizabeth II and a mock battle (son et lumière) that evening, after dark.

Portsmouth Harbour, taken from Gosport showing Portsdown Hill in the centre and the city of Portsmouth on the right including the home of the Royal Navy, HMNB Portsmouth.

== Chronology ==
The full timeline to Portsmouth's rich maritime history.

Population change
Year	Dwellings	Population	Source
1560		1000 (est)	
1801	5310	32,160	1801 census
1811	6852	40,567	1811 census
1821	8627	45,048	1821 census
1831	9410	50,389	1831 census
1841	9886	53,032	1841 census
1851	12,825	72,096	1851 census
1861	15,819	94,799	1861 census
1871	19,013	112,954	1871 census
1881	22,701	127,989	1881 census
1891	29,353	159,251	1891 census
1901	36,368	188,133	1901 census
1911		231,165	1911 census
1921		247,343	1921 census
1931		249,300	1931 census
1951		233,545	1951 census
1961	68,618	215,077	1961 census
1971		197,431	1971 census
1981		175,382	1981 census
1991		177,142	1991 census
2001		186,700	2001 census
2011		238,137	2011 census
2021		251,169	2021 census

== Pre-18th century ==
=== Medieval Portsmouth ===
- 1181 – The chapel of Southwick Priory is established on the site of the current Portsmouth Cathedral.
- 1194 – 2 May: Portsmouth is awarded its royal charter (town status) by Richard I.
- 1212
  - The docks are established.
  - Domus Dei, which is the first hospital of the city, is built on the site of the Royal Garrison Church.
- 1256 – Portsmouth is given permission to form a local guild of merchants.
- 1265 – The town is sacked and burnt during the Second Barons' War.
- 1338 – French invaders burn down most of the town.
- 1348 – The Black Death strikes Portsmouth for the first time.
- 1426 – The Round Tower, which is Portsmouth's first permanent defensive works, is completed.
- 1449 – Portsmouth is placed under Greater Excommunication as a result of the murder of Adam Moleyns, Bishop of Chichester.

=== Tudors and 17th century ===
- 1495 – Britain's first dry dock is built in Portsmouth.
- 1510 – The Mary Rose is built in Portsmouth dockyard by King Henry VIII, who then sees her sink in The Solent from Southsea Castle in 1545.
- 1543 – Southsea Castle is built.
- 1544 – The Keep is built alongside the Hot Walls as part of Portsmouth's coastal defence.
- 1561 – Britain's first state lottery funds further fortifications.
- 1563 – 300 locals die of the plague.
- 1590 – The first buildings in the area known as Portsmouth Point, or Spice Island as some people call it, are built.
- 16th century: Wymering Manor is built and is the oldest domestic building in Portsmouth as of 2025.
- 1625 – The Plague strikes Portsmouth.
- 1653 – Portsmouth in New Hampshire is incorporated.
- 1687 – The modern King James's Gate is built.
- Late 17th century – The Hot Walls are built as a line of defense in Old Portsmouth. They're then reconstructed between 1847 and 1850 using Flemish bond brickwork.

== 18th and 19th centuries ==
=== 1700 to 1849 ===
- 1729 – The Royal Naval Academy is established.
- 1732 – Portsmouth Grammar School is established.
- 1747 – Fort Cumberland is built in Eastney.
- 1753 – Portsmouth in Virginia is founded.
- 1760 – The modern Landport Gate is built.
- 1787 – The First Fleet of ships depart from Portsmouth bound for Australia.
- 1805 – Vice-Admiral Horatio Nelson, 1st Viscount Nelson sails from Portsmouth for the Battle of Trafalgar on HMS Victory, where he dies in battle.
- 1806 – The engineer Isambard Kingdom Brunel is born in Portsmouth.
- 1809 – The development of Southsea begins.
- 1811 – Piped water is introduced in Portsmouth.
- 1812 – The author Charles Dickens is born in Landport.
- 1820 to 1823 - The Little Morass marsh near Old Portsmouth is drained.
- 1823 – The Portsmouth and Arundel Canal is completed, but then it closes in 1827 after being used for only 4 years due to a lack of use.
- 1831? – Southsea Common is laid out.
- 1834 – Portsmouth is hit by an earthquake.
- 1835 – The Municipal Corporations Act 1835 abolishes Southampton's jurisdiction of the port.
- 1847 – The London and South Western Railway (L&SWR) opens to Portsmouth station, which then changes its name to Portsmouth & Southsea in 1925.

=== 1850 to 1899 ===
- 1854 – The 2nd HMS Illustrious ship to bear the name docks in Portsmouth to be used as a Navy training ship, where she remains until she's scrapped in 1868.
- 1861 – Clarence Pier built.
- 1862 – Dirt dredged out from Portsmouth Harbour is used to expand the size of Whale Isle by 125%, which is the start of the construction of HMNB Portsmouth. A viaduct is then built across to it in 1867, and various buildings and artillery are added throughout the years until it is fully completed in 1898.
- 1870 – Portsmouth Polytechnic is founded.
- 1872 – The Challenger Expedition is launched from Portsmouth.
- 1876
  - 26 April: The shore establishment HMS Vernon opens for the Royal Navy as a Torpedo Branch and lasts until 1996.
  - Portsmouth Harbour railway station opens for L&SWR services from London Waterloo station and the Portsmouth and Ryde Joint Railway.
- 1878
  - Spitbank Fort and St Helens Fort are open as forts for the Royal Navy, and they remain operational until 1956. Spitbank became a museum in 1982 and then a hotel in 2012, and St Helens remains in use as a navigational lighthouse for ships entering and departing The Solent.
  - Victoria Park, Portsmouth opens.
- 1879
  - 26 July: Southsea Pier opens, with its most recent renovations being completed in November 2019.
  - Brough Asylum (St James' Hospital) opens.
- 1880 – Horse Sand Fort and No Man's Fort open as forts for the Royal Navy, and they remain operational until 1956. No Man's was converted into a hotel in 2015, and although Horse Sand was featured in several TV shows in the years following, it remains empty as of 2022.
- 1882 – The Roman Catholic Cathedral of St John the Evangelist is dedicated.
- 1883 – The Gosport Ferry starts operating passenger services between Portsmouth Harbour railway station and Gosport.
- 1886 – Southsea Lifeboat Station opens.
- 1887 – Arthur Conan Doyle writes A Study in Scarlet, in which Sherlock Holmes makes his first appearance, at 1 Bush Villas, Elm Grove, Southsea, where he is practicing as a doctor.
- 1888 – County borough created.
- 1890 – Portsmouth Town Hall is built.
- 1891 – Portsmouth's population is 159,278.
- 1894 – Portsmouth power station opens.
- 1898 – Portsmouth F.C., which is the city's principal football club, is founded.
- 1899 – 15 August: Fratton Park stadium opens.
- Late 19th century - The Great Morass in Southsea is drained.

== 20th century ==
=== 1900 to 1949 ===
- 1901:
  - The Portsmouth Corporation Transport takes over the horse tram system, which they then electrify shortly after.
  - Portsmouth's population is 188,133.
- 1911 – The National Museum of the Royal Navy and the Royal Naval Museum opens, which later merge and is renamed Portsmouth Historic Dockyard.
- 1912:
  - 12 March: The former Labour Prime Minister James Callaghan is born at 38 Funtington Road in Copnor.
  - The RMS Titanic passes Portsmouth on her maiden and final voyage to New York City.
- 1916 - Portsmouth experiences its first aerial bombardment when a Zeppelin airship bombed it during World War I.
- 1918 – Southsea Lifeboat Station closes.
- 1922:
  - HMS Victory is permanently dry docked in Portsmouth Historic Dockyard after it was at risk of collapsing into the harbour after it was left to rot for many decades.
  - Southsea Common is purchased by Portsmouth City Council, who then lay it out with gardens, bowling greens, and tennis courts.
- 1924 – 15 October: The Portsmouth Naval Memorial is unveiled by Albert, Duke of York (Later George VI) to commemorate the 24,591 seamen who died during the 1st World War. This was then extended to commemorate the seamen who died during the 2nd World War, which was unveiled by the Queen Elizabeth, the Queen Mother, on 29 April 1953.
- 1925:
  - Peter Sellers is born in Castle Road in Southsea, Portsmouth.
  - The orchestral overture Portsmouth Point by William Walton is composed, with its first performance taking place in June 1926 as a piano duet. The full orchestral score is then published in 1928.
- 1926 – 21 April: Portsmouth is elevated to city status.
- 1927 – The Anglican parish church of St Thomas of Canterbury is elevated to the status of Portsmouth Cathedral.
- 1929 – Portsmouth F.C. play in their first FA Cup Final, but they lose 2–0 to the Bolton Wanderers.
- 1932 – Portsmouth Airport opens, which then closes in 1971 after a series of accidents.
- 1934 – The first trolleybuses operate in Portsmouth.
- 1936 – Portsmouth Corporation Transport runs the trams for the last time.
- 1939 – Portsmouth F.C. win the FA Cup for the first time.
- 1941 – Large areas of the city are destroyed in air raids, which results in the deaths of 930 people. Then in 1944, Southsea Beach and Portsmouth Harbour used as embarkation points for the D-Day landings invasion force.
- 1949 – Portsmouth F.C. are crowned as the Champions of England for the first time, and then for the second time in 1950.

=== 1950 to 1999 ===
- 1950 – Portsmouth is twinned with Duisburg in Germany.
- 1960 – Portsmouth City Council buy Southsea Castle, and they then renovate it to its pre-1850 appearance to open it as a tourist attraction. As of 2011–12, it has received over 90,000 visitors.
- 1963 – Portsmouth's trolleybuses run for the last time.
- 1965:
  - May: Portsmouth Lifeboat Station opens on Eastney Head, with a new lifeboat station being built in 1975 and renovations taking place in 1991.
  - Hovertravel starts operating a hovercraft service between Southsea and Ryde, making it the longest-running passenger hovercraft service in the world after Hoverspeed replaced their hovercraft with catamarans in 2000 and ceased operations in 2005.
- 1966
  - The Tricorn Centre opens.
  - HMS Andromeda is the last warship to be launched from Portsmouth Royal Dockyard.
- 1967 - Southsea Castle reopens as a museum.
- 1968 – Alec Rose completes his single-handed circumnavigation of the globe in Portsmouth Harbour after starting in 1964, and is knighted by HM Queen Elizabeth II the day after he completes this.
- 1972:
  - 4 March: Hovertravel's SR.N6 overturns and capsizes due to gale-force winds and massive swells, causing the deaths of 5 people.
  - Wightlink starts operating a ferry service between Portsmouth and Fishbourne under British Rail's Sealink brand, with the current name being introduced in 1990, and passenger services to Ryde pier head started as early as 1825.
- 1974 – Portsmouth becomes a local government district within the county of Hampshire.
- 1976
  - The M275 motorway, which links southern Portsmouth with the M27 and A27, opens.
  - Portsmouth International Port opens for ferry services to France, Spain and the Channel Isles as well as for Cruise and Freight/Cargo services.
  - IBM North Harbour opens
- 1982
  - 20 June: The Invincible-class ship HMS Illustrious (R06), which was the 5th warship and 2nd aircraft carrier to bear the name, was commissioned in Portsmouth by Princess Margaret, Countess of Snowdon.
  - 11 October: The hull of the Mary Rose is raised from The Solent and moved to a permanent dry dock in the Historic Dockyard.
- 1984 - The D-Day Story museum opens in Southsea.
- 1986 - The Sea Life Centre opens.
- 1987:
  - 5 June: Portsmouth is twinned with Caen in France.
  - 12 June: HMS Warrior arrives in Portsmouth after an 8-year restoration project in Hartlepool, and she opens as a museum ship on 27 July.
- 1988:
  - Portsmouth Corporation Transport is privatised.
  - July: The Pyramids Centre opens in Southsea.
- 1991 – The nave of the Anglican Portsmouth Cathedral is completed.
- 1992 – Portsmouth Polytechnic gains university status to become Portsmouth University.
- 1994
  - 2 May: Portsmouth celebrates its 800th anniversary by holding a pageant on Castle Field.
  - Portsmouth is used as the start and end point for a stage of the Tour de France.
  - The brownfield site around Camber Docks in Old Portsmouth is built up as a new housing estate, which is completed in 1996, and the surrounding parts of Old Portsmouth are developed in the following years.
- 1996 – 1 April: HMS Vernon closes when the various areas forming the establishment are split up and moved to different commands within the Royal Navy.
- 1997 – 1 April: The City of Portsmouth becomes a unitary authority.
- 1998 – Portsmouth hosts the second International Festivals of the Sea.
- 1999:
  - Serbian–American businessman Milan Mandarić buys Portsmouth F.C., taking it out of financial administration.
  - Southsea Town Council is formed.

== 21st century ==
=== 2000 to 2019 ===
- 2000
  - January: The Millennium Walk opens from Portsmouth Historic Dockyard to Clarence Pier via Gunwharf Quays and the Hot Walls to celebrate the new millennium.
  - 3 December: The SR.N4 hovercraft 'Princess Anne' passes Portsmouth on its way to the Hovercraft Museum in nearby Lee-on-the-Solent. Her sister craft, the 'Princess Margaret', passes a few days later.
  - Portsmouth suffers flooding due to the failure of the emergency water drainage system during heavy rainfall.
- 2001
  - MyTV, which is later renamed PortsmouthTV, is launched.
  - Gunwharf Quays opens on the site of the former HMS Vernon.
  - Portsmouth hosts the third International Festival of the Sea.
- 2003
  - The construction of the Spinnaker Tower begins.
  - Portsmouth F.C. enters the Premier League for the first time.
- 2004 – The Tricorn Centre is demolished after the last shops were closed in 2002.
- 2005
  - Portsmouth hosts the International Fleet Review and fifth International Festival of the Sea.
  - 18 October: The Spinnaker Tower opens.
- 2006 – The launch of HMS Clyde marks the return of shipbuilding to the city.
- 2008 – Portsmouth F.C. win the FA Cup for the second time, but they then enter administration in 2010 due to mounting debts.
- 2011 – The census taken this year shows that Portsmouth's population density is 11 times greater than that of London, making it the most densely populated city in the UK.
- 2014 – 28 August: HMS Illustrious (R06), which is the 5th ship and 2nd aircraft carrier to bear the name, is decommissioned in Portsmouth, where she spends the rest of her retirement. Then in 2016, she gets towed away to Turkey, where she's scrapped.
- 2015
  - June: The Land Rover BAR building is completed in Old Portsmouth after Olympic sailor Ben Ainslie established his team Ineos Team UK in 2014 and base themselves in Portsmouth.
  - July: The Spinnaker Tower is first sponsored by Emirates and is renamed the Emirates Spinnaker Tower, but they cause an outrage after they announce that the tower was going to be painted red. It was instead painted blue on the base and gold on the main structure.
- 2016 – Portsmouth's Hot Walls are converted into artist's studios and a cafe after having been abandoned and left empty for a few decades.
- 2017
  - 22 February: A World War 2 bomb containing 131 kg of 'high explosives' is found in Portsmouth harbour during its dredging work, and it is then towed out to sea to be detonated in the Solent.
  - 7 December: HMS Queen Elizabeth, which is the first of the Queen Elizabeth-class aircraft carriers, is commissioned in Portsmouth after being sponsored by HM Queen Elizabeth II. Being 280 m long, she is the largest-ever ship to enter Portsmouth Harbour.
- 2018:
  - 19 February: The University of Portsmouth is under fire over a £800,000 rebrand costs as departments face cuts.
  - 24 February: Snow settles in Portsmouth for the first time since 2011.
  - 27 May: Two people die after falling ill at this year's Mutiny Festival.
  - 26 August: Wightlink's newest ship, 'Victoria of Wight', starts service between Portsmouth and Fishbourne on this day after Portsmouth Gunwharf terminal undergoes a major upgrade in preparation for he arrival.
- 2019
  - 5–9 June: Portsmouth celebrates the 75th anniversary of the D-Day landings with celebrations in Southsea Common and a flyover featuring heritage aircraft, Royal Navy helicopters, RAF aircraft and the Red Arrows.
  - 10 December: HMS Prince of Wales, which is the sister ship of HMS Queen Elizabeth and the second of the Queen Elizabeth-class aircraft carriers, is commissioned in Portsmouth after being sponsored by Queen Camilla. Being 280 m long, she is the largest-ever ship to enter Portsmouth Harbour alongside her sister ship.
  - Plans are announced to expand Portsmouth International Port so it can accommodate larger ferries and a larger number of cruise ships.

=== 2020 to 2029 ===
- 2020
  - 23 March: Portsmouth goes into lockdown with the rest of the UK due to the COVID-19 pandemic, which allows the sea to become crystal clear for the first time in many decades.
  - 24 August: The D-Day landing craft LCT 7074, which is the last of its kind in existence, arrives in Southsea after being brought by the D-Day museum to add to its collection.
  - 7 September: The construction of the Southsea Coast Defense Scheme, which is to redevelop a 2.8 mile (4.5 km) stretch of coastline, begins. Upon its completion in 2026, it will be the largest-ever coastal defence project to be led by a local authority in the UK.
  - 5 November: Portsmouth joins the rest of the UK in a nationwide lockdown that lasts until 2 December in an attempt to reduce the number of COVID-19 cases.
  - 23 November: Portsmouth City Council announces that the Spinnaker Tower will return to its original white colour in the spring and summer of 2021 after the original sponsorship by Emirates ended on 30 June of this year.
  - 20 December: Portsmouth moves to Tier 4 restrictions after being in Tier 3 since 2 December.
- 2021
  - 4 January: The Prime Minister Boris Johnson announces that Portsmouth, along with the rest of the UK, will go into another nationwide lockdown to control the new variants of COVID-19 from 6 January, which will last at least until the Spring. Then on 22 February, he announces plans to bring the UK, including Portsmouth, out of lockdown, with restrictions being fully lifted by 21 June.
  - 6 February: Portsmouth council plans to reclaim land from sea for 2,000 new homes in Tipner West, which are then halted on 18 October.
  - 30 March: The repainting of the Spinnaker Tower into its original white begins, which is then completed on 20 July.
  - 14 June:
    - Plans to end COVID-19 restrictions are delayed by 4 weeks to 19 July due to a sharp rise of the Delta variant.
    - Plans are announced for Fratton Park stadium to undergo a £10m revamp, making it the first major change to it since 1997.
  - 22 June: Scarlet Lady of Virgin Voyages makes her maiden sailing into Portsmouth, making her the largest cruise ship to enter Portsmouth Harbour and the first of 4 sister ships. She then makes her maiden voyage on 6 August for round-the-UK cruises over a 6-week period. She then leaves Portsmouth for the last time on 3 September on her way to New York City.
  - 19 July: COVID-19 restrictions in England, including Portsmouth, come to an end after Prime Minister Boris Johnson confirms this on 12 July.
  - 19 October: Plans are announced to redevelop the side of the former Tricorn Centre into shops and thousands of new homes after Portsmouth council agreed to purchase the land.
  - 27 October: Plans are announced the replace Wightlink's St Faith with a 100% electric replacement, which is due in be in service in 2026 at the earliest.
  - 28 October: Horse Sand Fort is brought for £715,000 by business Mike Clare, who has previously transformed two of the other Palmerston forts into luxury hotels.
  - 8 December: Prime Minister Boris Johnson announces plan B of COVID-19 restrictions due to a sharp increase of the Omicron variant.
- 2022
  - 12 January: HMS Victory undergoes major structural renovations to celebrate its 100th anniversary of being in dry dock as part of its ongoing renovations, which is due to be completed by the end of the decade.
  - 26 January: Plan B measures for COVID-19 restrictions across the UK, including Portsmouth, come to an end after Prime Minister Boris Johnson announces this on 19 January following a decline in the Omicron variant.
  - 18 February: Wightlink's 'St Faith' struggles to come into Portsmouth Harbour as a result of Storm Eunice, and so she resorts to anchoring in The Solent in order to make the entry easier.
  - 24 February: Prime Minister Boris Johnson removes the last of the COVID-19 restrictions (compulsory isolation with a positive test) in Portsmouth and the rest of the UK.
  - 1 March: Valiant Lady of Virgin Voyages makes her maiden sailing into Portsmouth, making her the largest cruise ship to enter Portsmouth Harbour alongside her sister ship Scarlet Lady.
  - 5 March: The former Gosport ferry 'Portsmouth Queen' makes a brief visit to Portsmouth on her way to St Peter's Port in Guernsey to become a floating cafe.
  - 31 March: A search and rescue mission was carried out by Virgin Voyages after a person fell overboard from Valiant Lady before her departure to Zeebrugge in Belgium.
  - 24 May: The redevelopment of Portsmouth International Port begins, which is due to be completed by the spring of 2023.
  - 5 July: Portsmouth Hospitals University NHS Trust is the first in the world to transport chemotherapy drugs by drone over to St Mary's Hospital in Newport, Isle of Wight.
  - 10 July: Penny Mordaunt, who is the MP for Portsmouth North, announces her bid for the leadership of the Conservative Party and Prime Minister after the resignation of Boris Johnson. She then loses out to Rishi Sunak and Liz Truss on 20 July, and then on 6 September, she becomes the leader of the House of Commons and Lord President of the Council.
  - 20 July: Wightlink's 'Victoria of Wight' helps rescue a boy who was swept out to sea near the entrance to Portsmouth Harbour and its ferry terminal.
  - 12 August: A drought is officially declared in the south of England, including Portsmouth, during the second heatwave of this year.
  - 12 October: Plans for the Tipner development move a step forward after Portsmouth City Council approved a 'set of principles' for developing the site in Tipner West. If fully approved, this would allow at least 1,250 new homes to be built.
  - 29 October: The Portsmouth-based Royal Navy warship HMS Medway seizes £24,000,000 of cocaine before blowing up the smugglers' boat in the Caribbean alongside a US Coast Guard Law Enforcement Detachment and an accompanying aircraft.
  - 15 November: The USS Gerald R. Ford, which is the world's largest warship, at 337 metres (1,106 feet), arrives and anchors in The Solent, making her the largest ship to do so. She then leaves by the end of the week.
  - December: Royal Mail strikes affect Portsmouth's Christmas post.
  - Portsmouth's railway services are affected during the National Union of Rail, Maritime and Transport Workers (RMT) and ASLEF rail strikes throughout this year and into early 2023.
- 2023
  - 3 February: Portsmouth International Port is ahead of the UK schedule to provide shore power facilities.
  - 10 February: The first part of the Southsea Coastal Schemes opens to the public.
  - 2 April: The Mary Rose museum announce plans for a 4D cinema experience of the wreck's lifting of 1982.
  - 26 April: It is announced that HMS Prince of Wales is to be 'cannabilised' in Glasgow for the refurbishment of HMS Queen Elizabeth after a major mechanical failure. Her operational programme is due to restart in the Autumn of this year.
  - 28 April: Sailors and marines' rigorous coronation rehearsals take place in Portsmouth ahead of the coronation of King Charles III on 6 May.
  - 4 May: Plans for Portsmouth's tallest building, a 38-story skyscraper with flats, shops and commcercial units, are withdrawn.
  - 5 May: It's announced that Macmillan Cancer Support is to become the new presenting partner for the Spinnaker Tower from June. Unlike the Emirates sponsorship, only a logo will be painted on the bottom section of one of the legs.
  - 18 May: The first steps are taken towards the renovation of Hilsea Lido, which will be closed until 2025 in time for its 90th anniversary.
  - 19 May: The Type 23 frigate HMS Iron Duke is set to return home to Portsmouth after spending 4 years in Devonport following a major overhaul.
  - 20 May:
    - Royal Navy jobs are created in Gosport as the Ministry of Defence (MoD) confirms £320m contracts to service offshore patrol ships.
    - It's announced that TUI Cruises' Mein Schiff 3 will come into Portsmouth Harbour throughout the summer starting on 26 May. At 293.8 metres long, she will be the largest ship ever to enter the harbour.
  - 27 June: Portsmouth is named as one of the UK’s top 50 universities in global rankings.
  - 4 August: HMS Prince of Wales returns to Portsmouth Harbour after 9 months of essential repair work.
  - 14 August: Portsmouth-born Lawrence Churcher, who is the last surviving Royal Navy Dunkirk veteran, dies a few days short of his 103rd birthday.
  - 22 August: Work to put in 8,900 solar panels at The Lakeside North Harbour business park starts.
  - 13 November: The new-look "Portsmouth News" hit newsstands on this day, making it the latest of the National World’s metro titles to be overhauled by their daily press division.
  - 11 December: HMS Prince of Wales returns to Portsmouth after its landmark US deployment.
  - Portsmouth's mainline railway services continue to be affected as the National Union of Rail, Maritime and Transport Workers (RMT) rail strikes continue into this year.
- 2024
  - 30 January: A burst sewer on the Eastern Road causes traffic chaos for the third time in a few months.
  - 17 April: Portsmouth F.C. is promoted to the Championship after 12 years in exile with 2 games to spare.
  - 3 June: Vintage and serving Royal Navy warships escort a ferry transporting around 40 men and women connected with the Normandy landings as they head to France for possibly the final salute as part of the D-Day 80th anniversary events.
  - 30 July: HMS Queen Elizabeth returns to Portsmouth tomorrow following 4 months of repairs in Scotland and a short intensive spell at sea to test her systems.
  - 7 August: Riots take place in Portsmouth and Hampshire following the Southport stabbings.
  - 3 December: A large unexploded ordnance is found in Southsea and is detonated by that evening.
  - 6-8 December: Portsmouth, alongside most of the South West of England, is issued a Yellow Weather Warning due to the strong winds of Storm Darragh.
  - Portsmouth's mainline railway services continue to be affected during ASLEF and RMT strikes during the earlier part of the year. These are called off during the summer.
- 2025:
  - 15 January: Sir Keir Starmer announces that the Isle of Wight ferries, including Wightlink and Hovertravel, are "simply not good enough".
  - 23 January: It's announced that Hovertravel will see job losses and cuts to services due to lower passenger numbers.
  - 27 January: Lightning strikes the Spinnaker Tower as a ferocious flash thunderstorm hits Portsmouth.
  - 27 January to 2 February: Wightlink car ferries are temporarily diverted to Portsmouth International Port whilst renewal and maintenance works take place at their Gunwharf Terminal.
  - Late January: The Bournemouth Symphony Orchestra visits primary schools in Portsmouth as part of its popular series of free concerts for pupils.
