= Étoile du Roy =

Tall ship

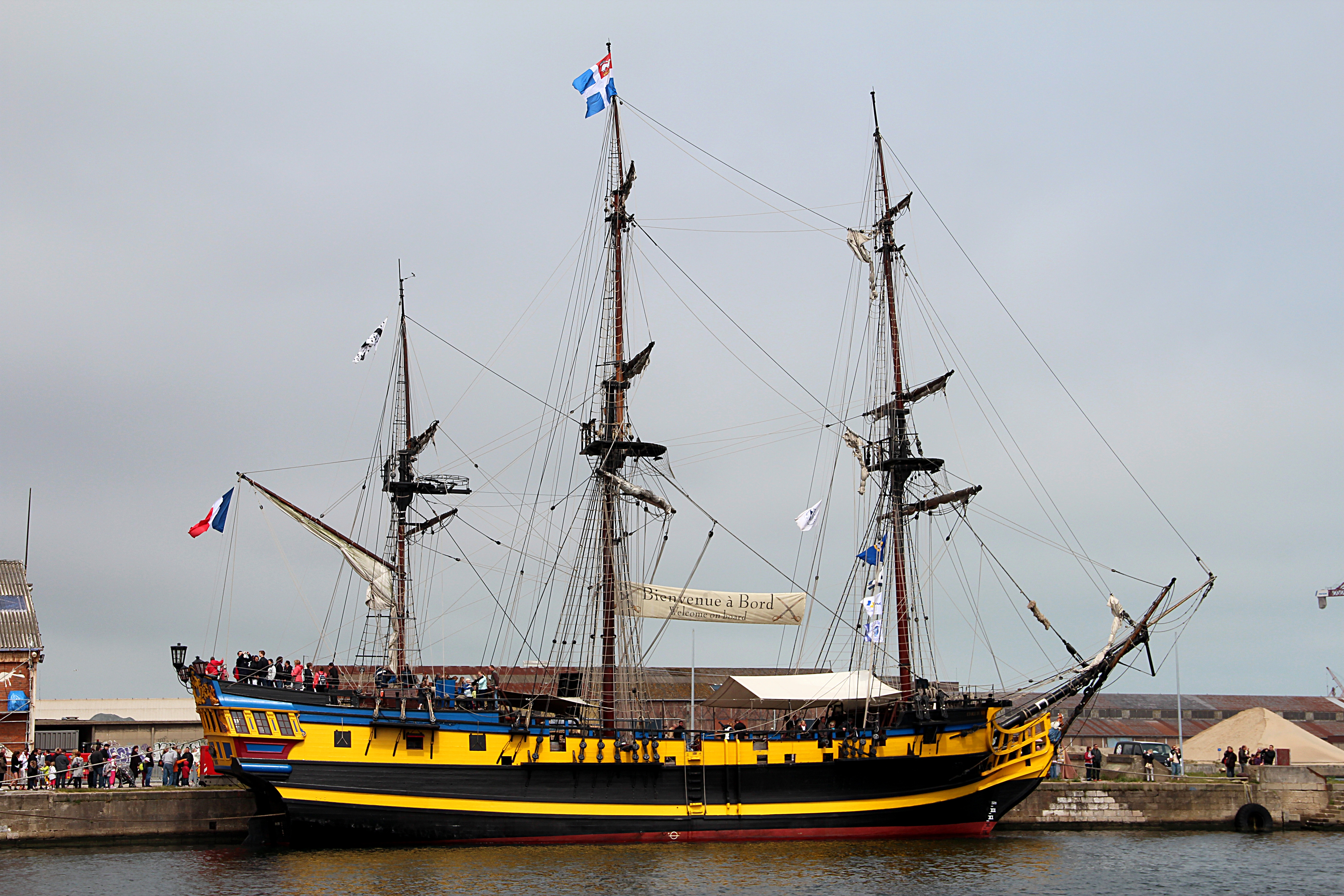
- Étoile du Roy, formerly Grand Turk, moored in Dunkirk, France.

History

United Kingdom
- Name: Grand Turk
- Owner: Turk Phoenix Ltd.
- Laid down: December 1996
- Launched: September 1997
- Fate: Sold, 2010

France
- Name: Étoile du Roy
- Owner: Étoile Marine Croisières
- Port of registry: Saint-Malo, Brittany
- Acquired: 2010
- Identification: IMO number: 900582; Call sign: FFZA; MMSI number: 228000700
- Status: in active service, as of 2019

General characteristics
- Type: Tall ship
- Tonnage: 314 GT; 94 NT
- Length: 152 ft (46 m) o/a; 125 ft (38 m) deck; 97 ft (30 m) w/l
- Beam: 34 ft (10 m)
- Draught: 10 ft (3.0 m)
- Propulsion: 2 × 400 hp (298 kW) Kelvin TAS8 diesel engines; 2 shafts; 1 × 60 hp (45 kW) bow thruster
- Sail plan: Full-rigged ship; Sail area 8,500 sq ft (790 m^{2})
- Speed: 9 knots (17 km/h; 10 mph) (engines)
- Crew: 9 permanent + up to 23 volunteers
- Armament: 6 × 9-pounder guns; 3 × 2-pounder guns

Étoile du Roy (English: "King's Star"), formerly Grand Turk, is a tall ship launched in 1997. Designed to represent a generic European warship during the Age of Sail, her design was modelled after HMS Blandford, a sixth-rate frigate of the Royal Navy. The ship was built in Marmaris, Turkey between 1996 and 1997 to provide a replica of a British frigate for the production of the ITV Network series Hornblower. In 2010, the French company Étoile Marine Croisières, based in Saint-Malo, purchased the ship and renamed her Étoile du Roy. Having been featured in several films or television series, she is currently used mainly in sailing events, for corporate or private charter, and for receptions in her spacious saloon or on her deck.

== Construction and design ==
The model for the replica was HMS Blandford, a sixth-rate frigate of the Royal Navy designed by Michael Turk of Turks Shipyard Ltd. of Chatham, Kent, which was established in 1710. The modern replica was constructed of iroko planking over laminated mahogany frames. She has an overall length of 152 ft (46 m), and is 97 ft (30 m) at the waterline, with a beam of 34 ft (10 m) and a draught of 10 ft (3.0 m). The frigate is square-rigged on three masts with a sail area of 8,500 sq ft (790 m^{2}), and has two 400 hp (298 kW) Kelvin TAS8 diesel engines, and a 60 hp (45 kW) bow thruster, as well as four AC generators for electrical power.

The ship was originally fitted with six 9-pounder replica cannon constructed by the naval dockyard of Sevastopol, Ukraine. These guns consisted of a high tensile steel tube encased in moulded alloy to resemble the original weapons, and were designed only to fire 400 g (14 oz) black powder charges. On 24 August 2001 a crew member was injured after a premature explosion during the firing of a gun, while the ship was taking part in the International Festival of the Sea at Portsmouth. The Marine Accident Investigation Branch were obliged to consult the Keeper of Artillery from the Royal Armouries museum for technical assistance and advice.

== Appearances ==
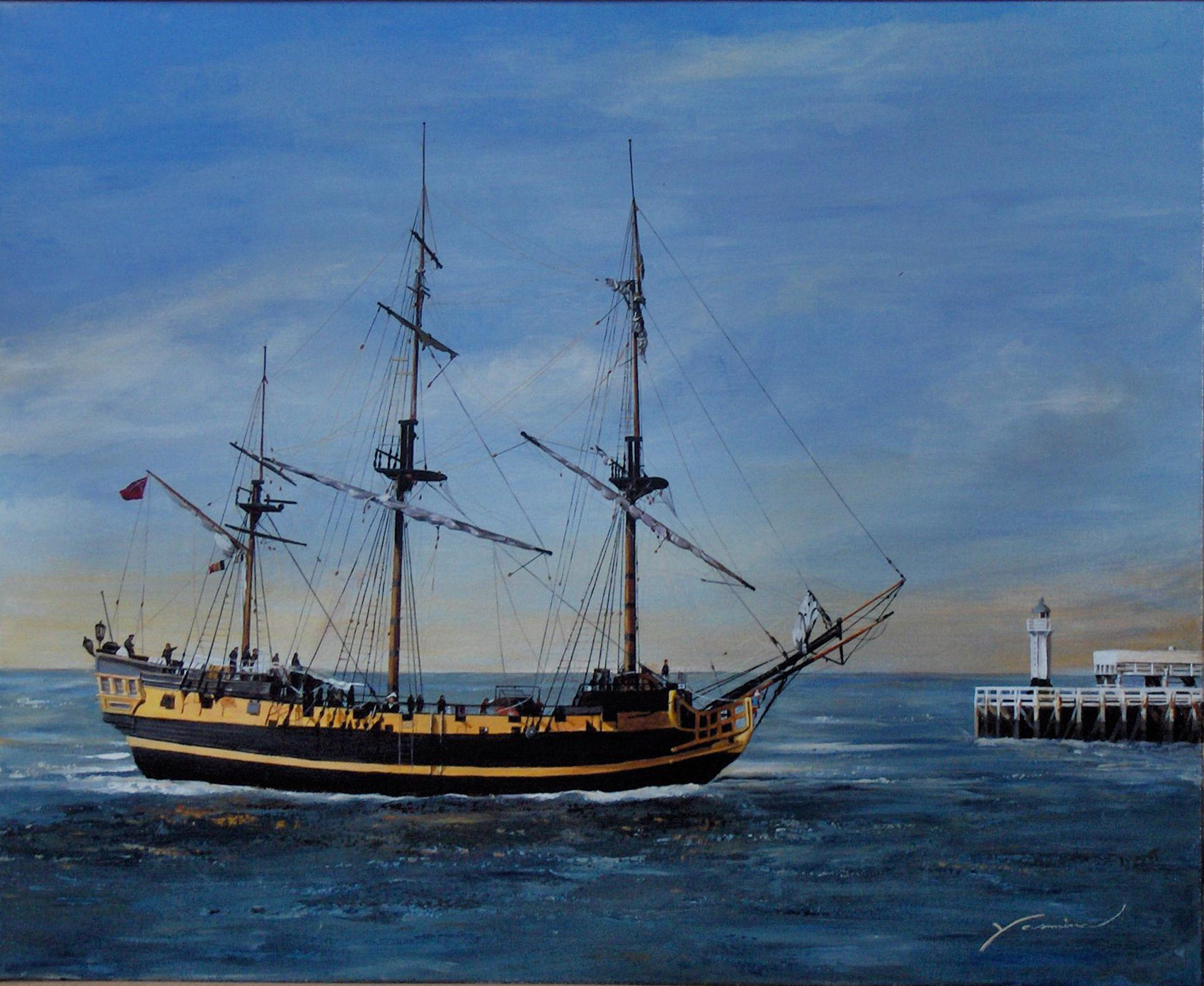
2008 painting of Grand Turk entering Ostend harbour

Grand Turk is familiar as a stand in for HMS Indefatigable in the TV series Hornblower, although the historical Indefatigable was a much larger ship. She also served in the same TV series as the French ship Papillon. In 2000, she undertook a voyage around Britain for the National Trust, calling at eight ports, where she was open to the public with the National Trust 'Coast Show' on board. On 28 June 2005 she stood in for HMS Victory, Nelson's flagship at Trafalgar, during the International Fleet Review off Portsmouth (GB), commemorating the 200th anniversary of the Battle of Trafalgar.

=== Film and TV credits ===
- Hornblower, 1998–2003.
- Longitude, 2000.
- Monsieur N., 2003.
- To the Ends of the Earth, 2005.
- Crusoe, 2008.
- Michiel de Ruyter, 2015.
- La Fortuna, 2021.
- Napoleon, 2023

== Current location ==
The frigate was purchased by Bob Escoffier of the Étoile Marine Croisières, which already operates a number of traditional sailing ships: Étoile de France, Étoile Molène, Étoile Polaire, Naire Maove' and the schooner-aviso Recouvrance in Brest (in partnership with its owner, the SOPAB). The final sale price was not disclosed.

After being moored in Whitby for over a decade, Grand Turk sailed for her current location in France on 16 March 2010.

Ship images
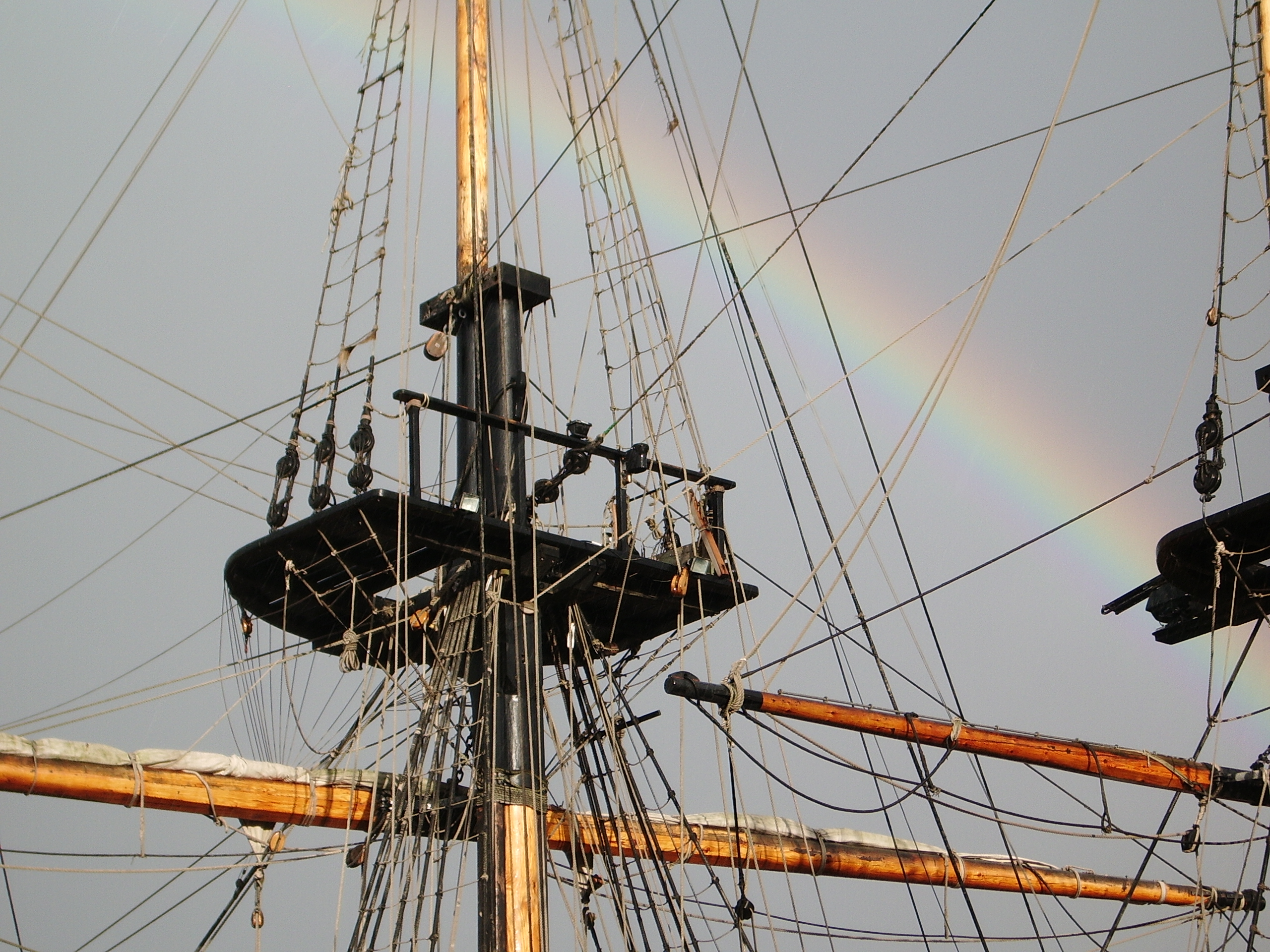
Rainbow in the rigging

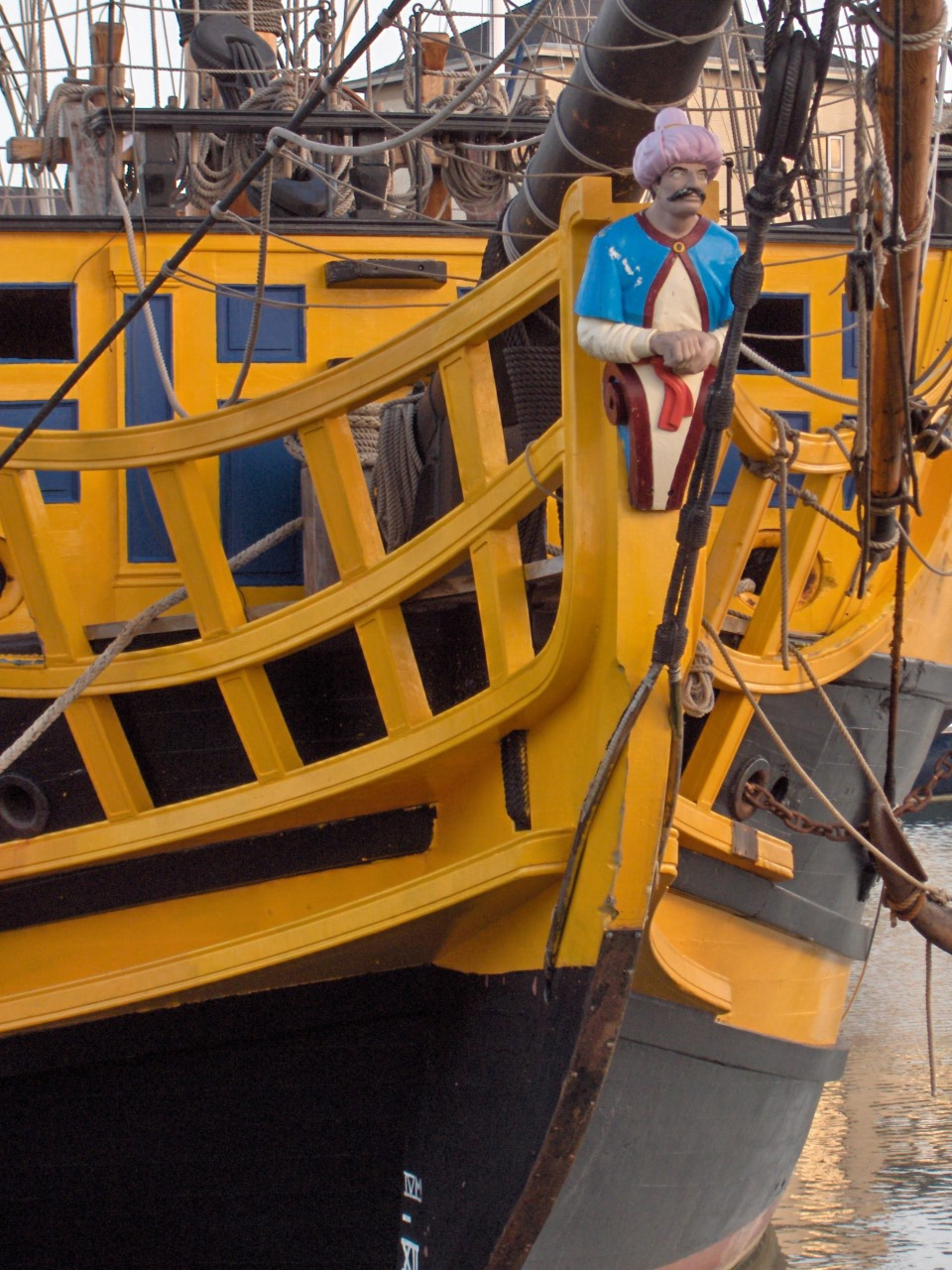
Figurehead

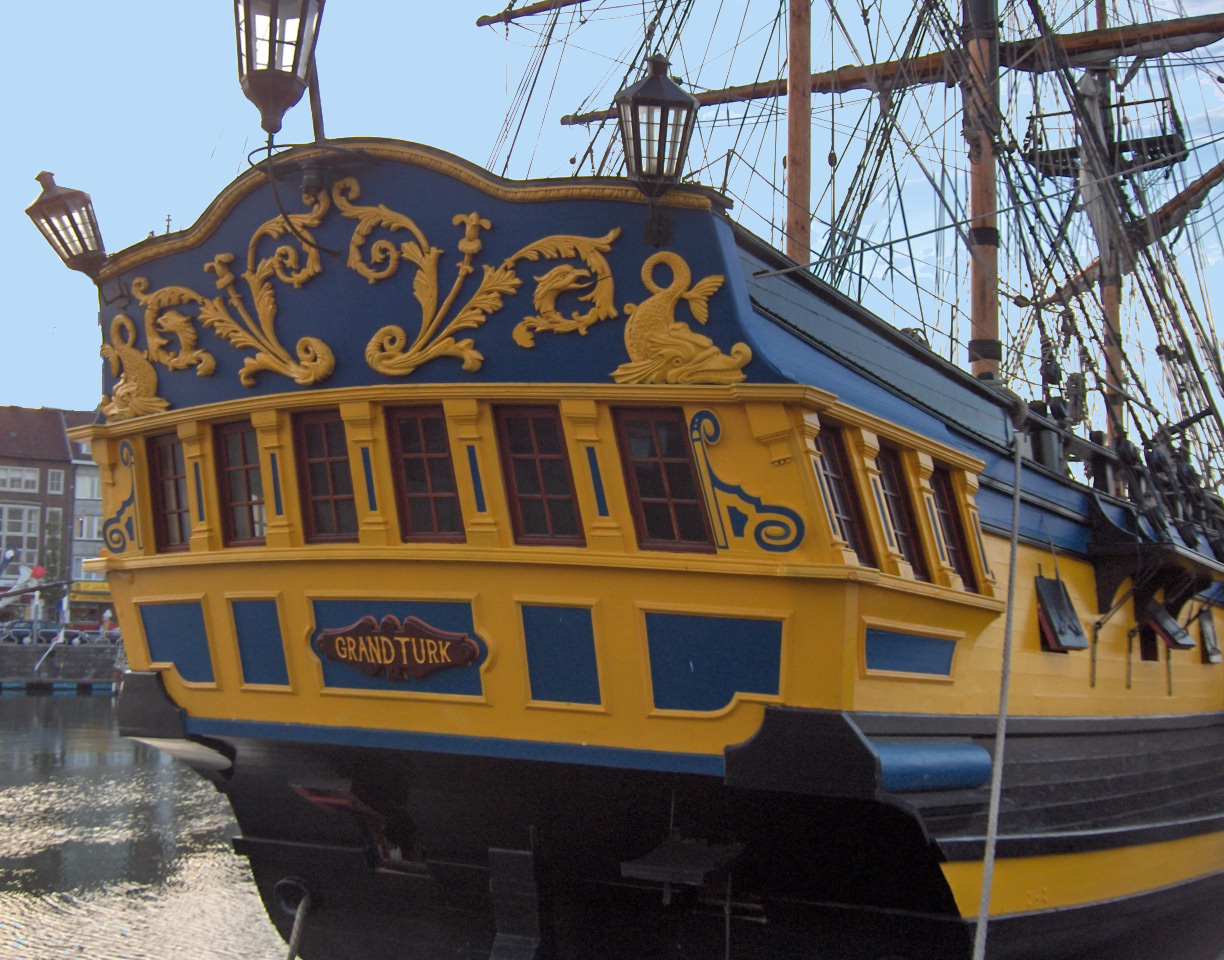
Stern

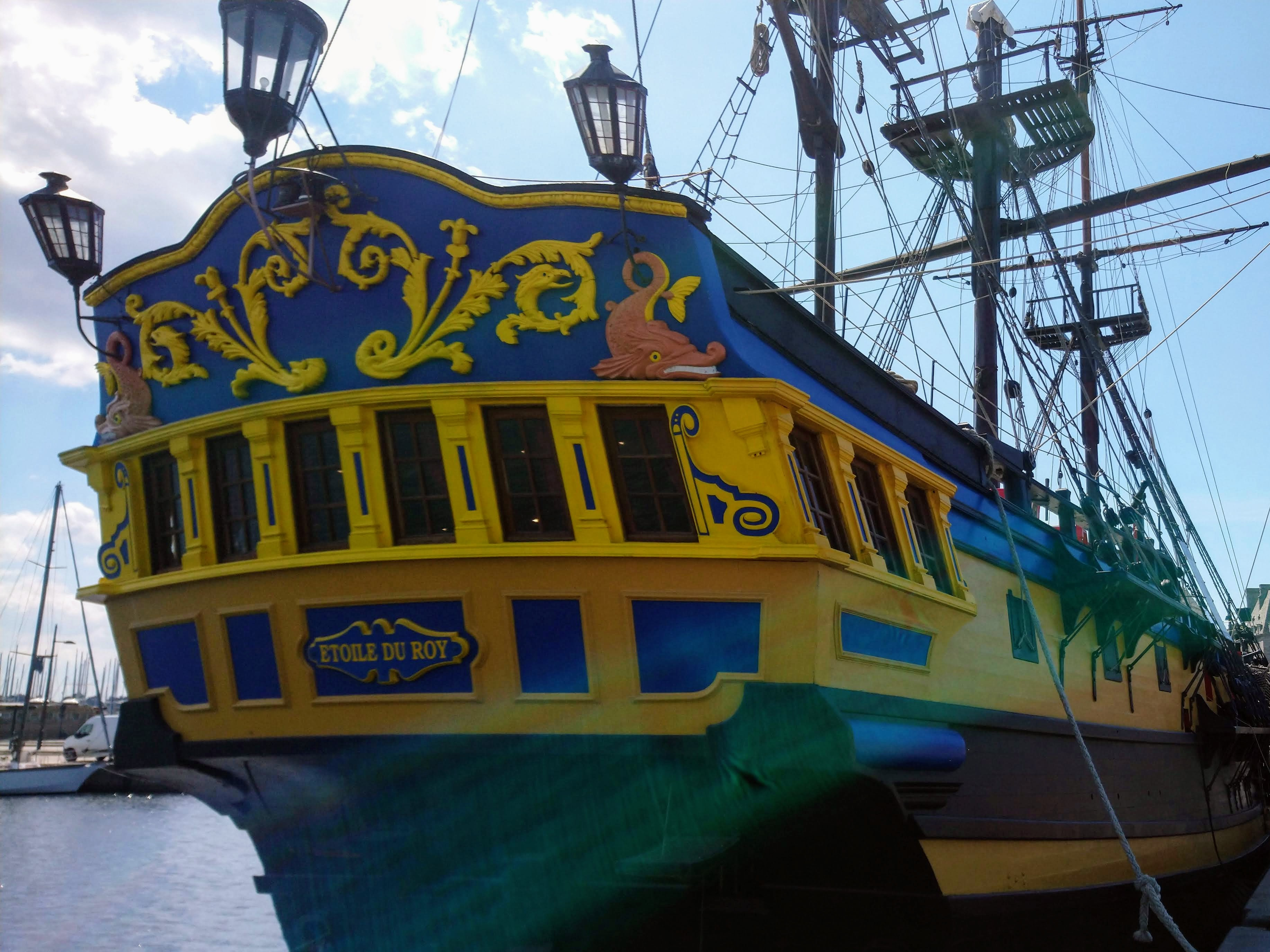
New stern after name change

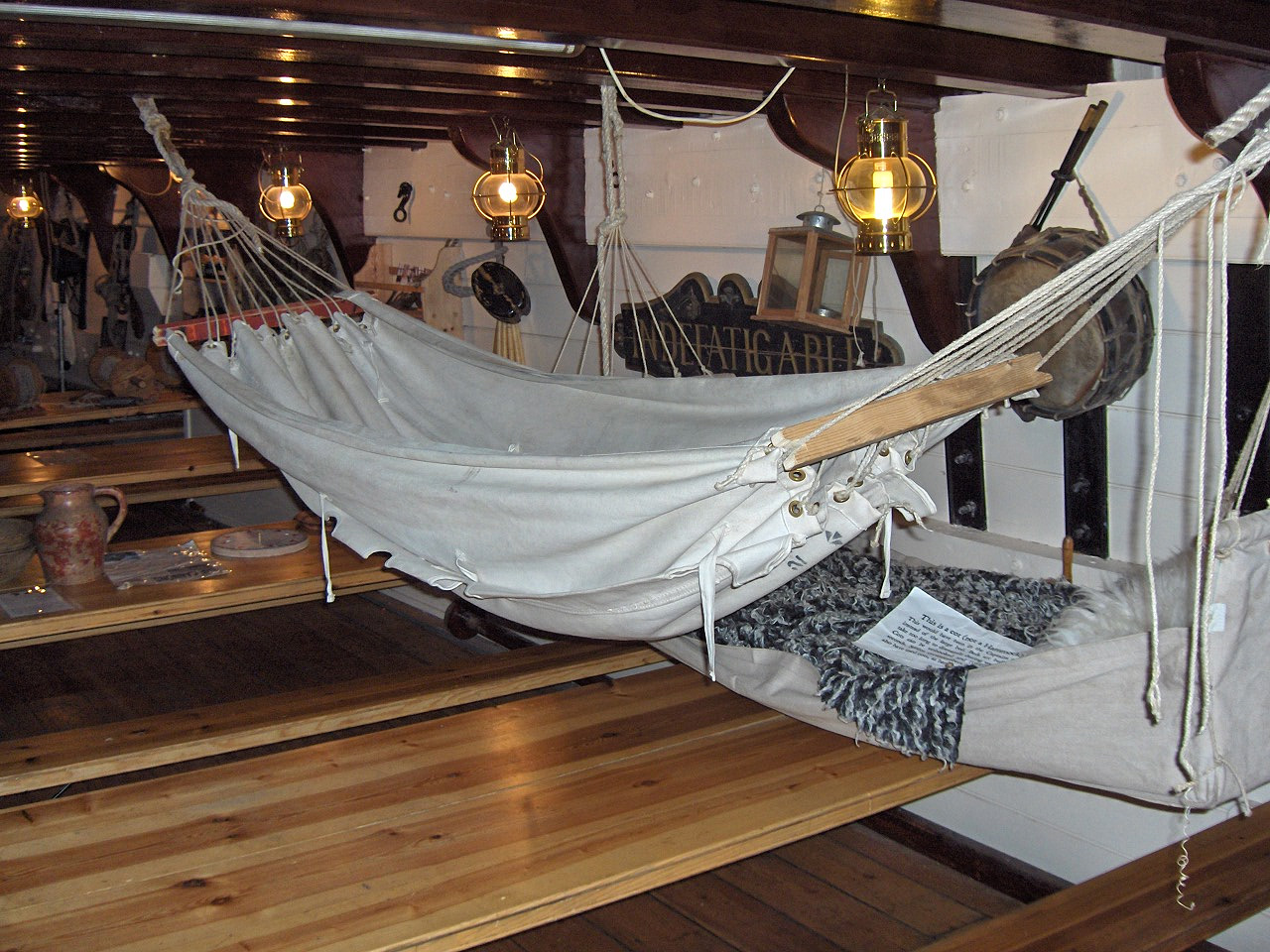
Hammocks rigged below

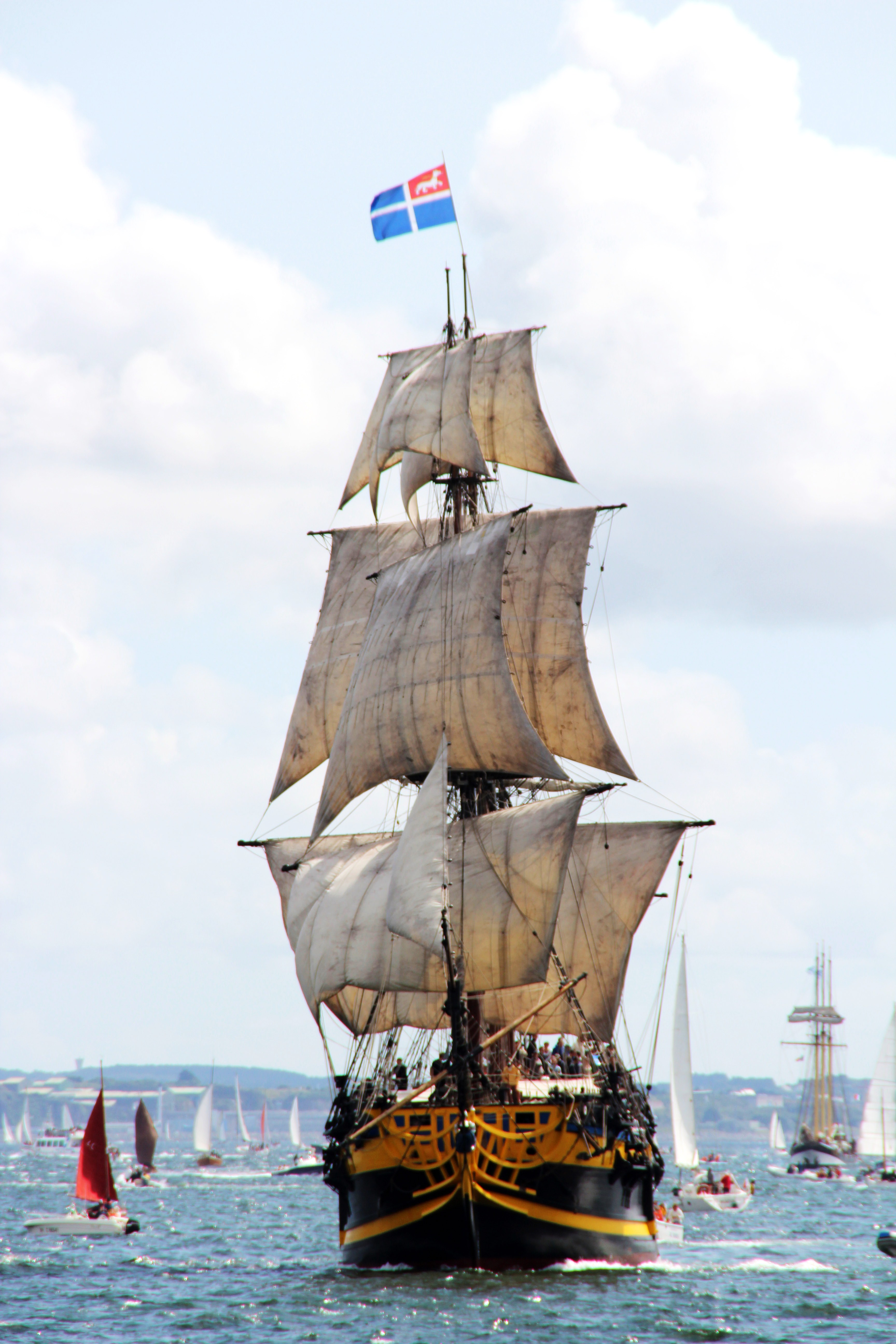
Étoile du Roy at Brest, 2012

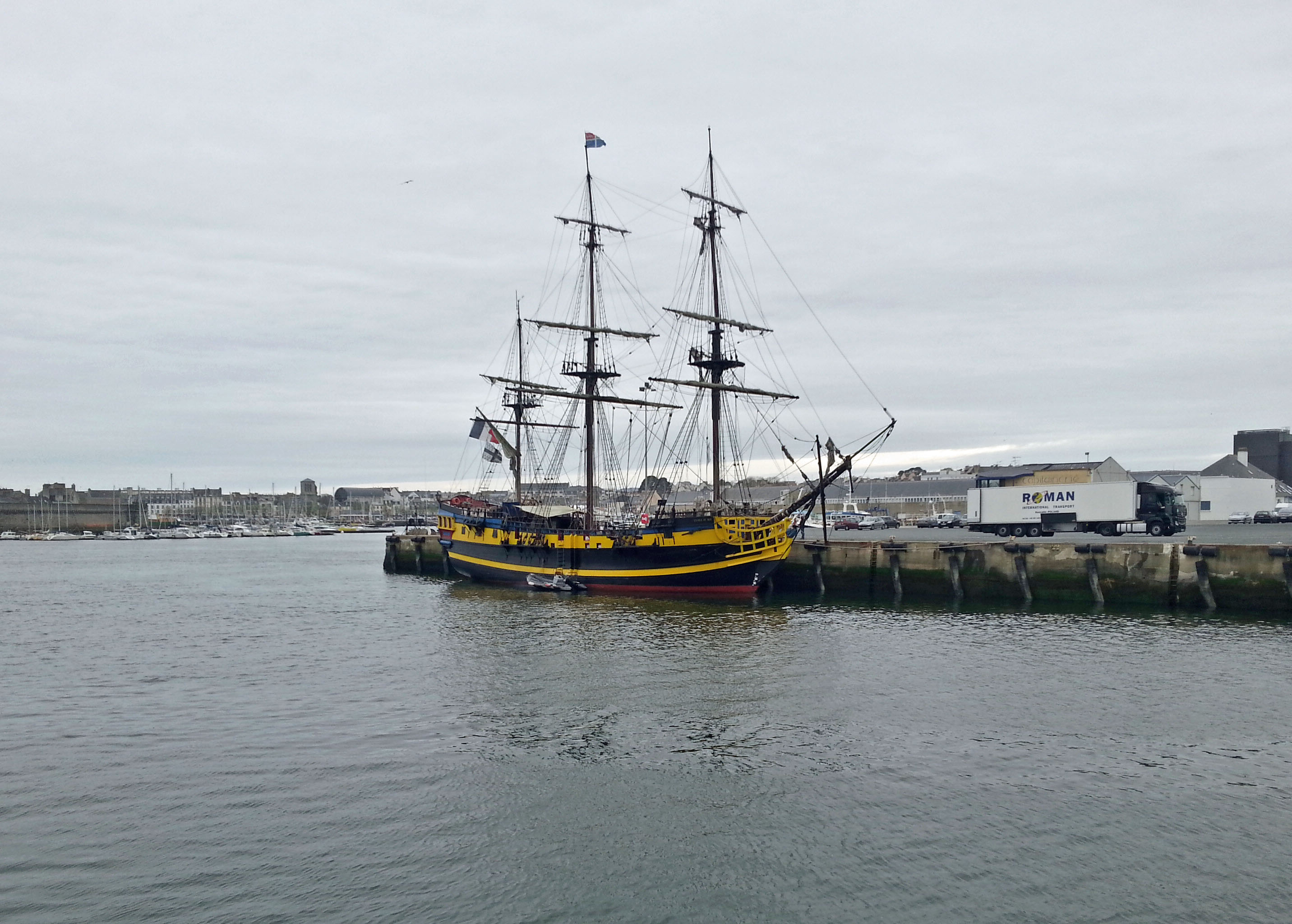
Étoile du Roy at Concarneau, 2014

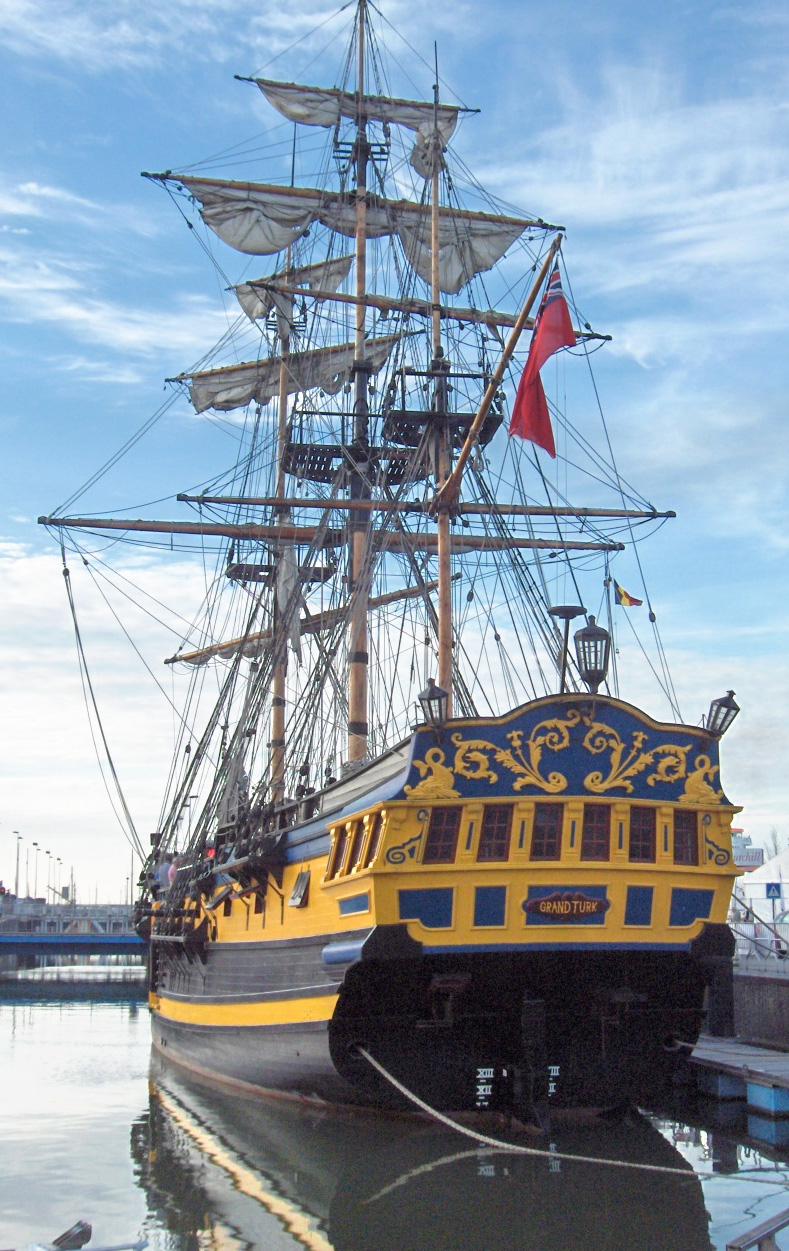
Grand Turk, moored in Ostend, Belgium.

== See also ==
- HMS Surprise – Replica of HMS Rose (1757), built in 1970.
- Ship replica (including a list of ship replicas)
