= 6th Battalion, Hampshire Regiment =

3rd Volunteer Battalion, Hampshire Regiment 6th Battalion, Hampshire Regiment (Duke of Connaught's Own) (TF) 59th (Duke of Connaught’s Hampshire) Anti-Tank Regiment Royal Artillery (TA) 383rd Field Regiment Royal Artillery (Duke of Connaught’s Royal Hampshire) (TA)
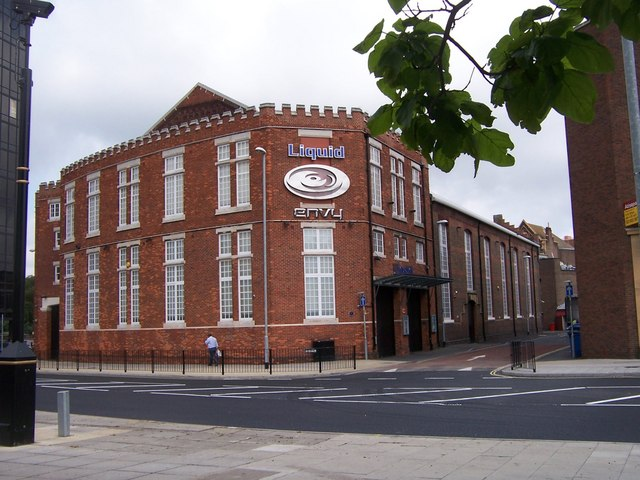
- Connaught Drill Hall, Portsmouth. Headquarters of the unit from 1902
- Active: 1860–1971
- Country: United Kingdom
- Branch: Territorial Army
- Type: Infantry (1860-1938); Anti-Tank Artillery (1938-1951); Field Artillery
- Garrison/HQ: Portsmouth, Hampshire

Commanders
- Colonel in Chief: Prince Arthur, Duke of Connaught and Strathearn

The 6th Battalion, Hampshire Regiment was an infantry battalion of the British Army. Part of the Volunteer Force, later the Territorial Force (renamed the Territorial Army in 1920), the battalion was part of the Hampshire Regiment and recruited from Portsmouth, Hampshire. It served as infantry during World War I and as a Royal Artillery regiment during and after World War II.

== Volunteer Force 1860-1908 ==
The battalion's origins lay in the enthusiasm for joining local Rifle Volunteer Corps (RVCs) engendered by an invasion scare in 1859. The volunteer units which became the battalion comprised the following:

- 4th Hampshire Rifle Volunteers – formed in Havant in February 1860
- 5th Hampshire Rifle Volunteers – formed in Portsmouth in February 1860
- 6th Hampshire Rifle Volunteers – formed in Gosport in March 1860
- 7th Hampshire Rifle Volunteers – formed in Fareham in May 1860
- 12th Hampshire Rifle Volunteers – formed in Petersfield in May 1860
- 23rd Hampshire Rifle Volunteers – formed in Cosham in November 1860

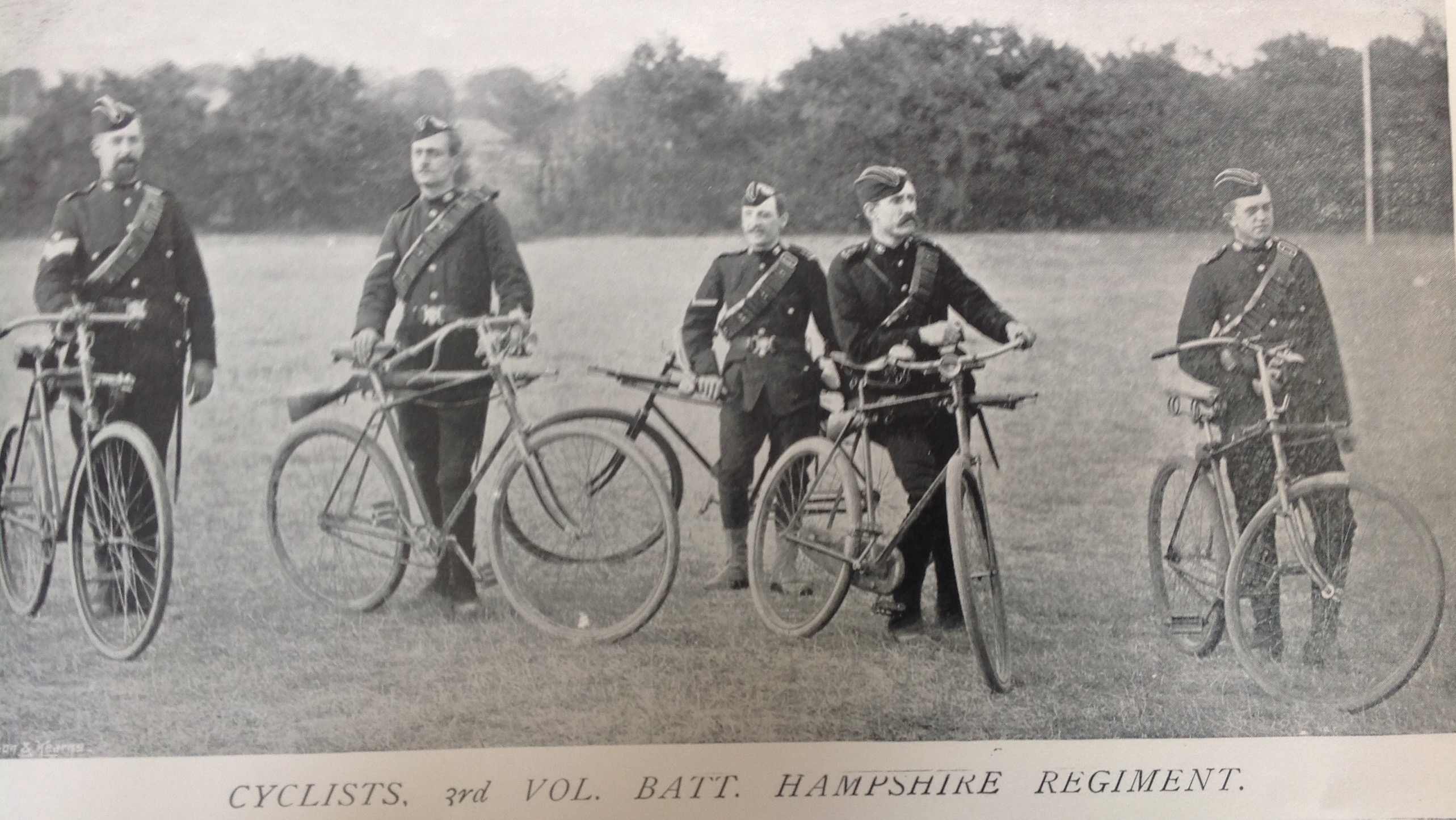
Cyclists of the 3rd Volunteer Battalion Hampshire Regiment, 1896

In 1880 the units were linked together to create the 2nd Administrative battalion Hampshire Rifle Volunteers. By 1885 the battalion was redesignated 3rd Volunteer Battalion, Hampshire Regiment. Lettered companies were created to form the following organisation:

- A-E Companies (late 5th Hampshire)
- F-G Companies (late 6th Hampshire)
- H Company (late 4th Hampshire)
- I Company (late 12th Hampshire)
- K Company (late 7th Hampshire)
- L Company (late 23rd Hampshire)

In 1893 the battalion received the designation ‘’’Duke of Connaught’s Own’’’. In 1901 the headquarters of the unit were at the newly-opened Connaught Drill Hall in Portsmouth.

== Territorial Force ==
On the formation of the Territorial Force in 1908, the unit became the 6th Battalion (Duke of Connaught's Own) Hampshire Regiment (Territorial Force), part of the Hampshire Brigade within the 43rd (Wessex) Infantry Division.

== First World War ==
=== 1/6th Battalion ===
In October 1914, the 43rd (Wessex) Division was ordered to India to relieve Regular troops there. The 1/6th (Duke of Connaught's Own) Battalion landed in India in November 1914: it remained there until transfer to Mesopotamia in 1917.

The battalion was demobilised on 11 September 1919.

=== 2/6th Battalion ===
Formed at Portsmouth in September 1914 as a home service (“second line”) unit. Initially part of 2/1st Hampshire Brigade in 2nd Wessex Division, but did not proceed with the rest of the Division to India. Moved to Petersfield, then Bournemouth and Hursley Park. On 13 February 1915 it became a Provisional Battalion. This was known at various times as the Hampshire Brigade Battalion, the 84th Provisional Battalion, and then the 17th Battalion.

== Interwar ==
The 6th Battalion Hampshire Regiment reformed in the retitled Territorial Army (TA) in 1920.

In 1938 battalion was converted into the 59th (Duke of Connaught's Hampshire) Anti-Tank Regiment, Royal Artillery (TA) .

== Second World War ==
The 59th Anti-Tank Regiment served with the 43rd (Wessex) Infantry Division and went with them to Normandy. The 6th were commanded by Lieutenant-Colonel Donald Ray on D-Day, however he was killed the following month from wounds received in action near Caen.

On the outbreak of the Second World War in 1939 the Territorial Army was doubled in size. As a result, a 2nd Line duplicate unit was raised as 69th Anti-Tank Regiment, Royal Artillery (TA) with headquarters at Gosport. The unit was redesignated in 1943 as 69th Light Anti-Aircraft /Anti-Tank Regiment RA (TA). It was subsequently converted to an infantry role and amalgamated with 51st (Westmorland and Cumberland) Field Regiment, Royal Artillery as 51st/69th Infantry Regiment, Royal Artillery, serving with the Chindits in which 69th LAA/AT Rgt provided 69 Column.

== Postwar ==
When the TA was reconstituted in 1947, the regiment was reformed as 383rd Anti-Tank Regiment, RA (Duke of Connaught's Royal Hampshire) (TA), with headquarters still in Portsmouth. In 1961 reductions in the size of the Territorial Army led to the amalgamation of the regiment with ‘P’ Battery of 256th (Wessex) Light Anti-Aircraft Regiment RA (TA) to form 383rd Field Regiment Royal Artillery (Duke of Connaught's Royal Hampshire) (TA).

With further reductions in the Territorial Army in 1967 the unit became B Company (Duke of Connaught's 6th Royal Hampshire RA) The Hants and Isle of Wight Territorials.

In 1971 on the formation of the Wessex Regiment, ‘A’ Company of the new regiment was designated Duke of Connaught's Own. On the disbandment of the company in the 1990s, the title was lost, though was resurrected in 2014 with the formation of No. 679 (The Duke of Connaught's) Squadron AAC.

== Bibliography ==
- Maj A. F. Becke,History of the Great War: Order of Battle of Divisions, Part 2a: The Territorial Force Mounted Divisions and the 1st-Line Territorial Force Divisions (42–56), London: HM Stationery Office, 1935/Uckfield: Naval & Military Press, 2007, ISBN 1-847347-39-8.
- Maj A. F. Becke,History of the Great War: Order of Battle of Divisions, Part 2b: The 2nd-Line Territorial Force Divisions (57th–69th), with the Home-Service Divisions (71st–73rd) and 74th and 75th Divisions, London: HM Stationery Office, 1937/Uckfield: Naval & Military Press, 2007, ISBN 1-847347-39-8.
- Ian F.W. Beckett, Riflemen Form: A study of the Rifle Volunteer Movement 1859–1908, Aldershot: Ogilby Trusts, 1982, ISBN 0 85936 271 X.
- Scott Daniell, David (2009). The Royal Hampshire Regiment 1918-1954. Naval & Military Press. ISBN 978-1-84574-257-7.
- Col John K. Dunlop, The Development of the British Army 1899–1914, London: Methuen, 1938.
- Gen. Sir Martin Farndale, History of the Royal Regiment of Artillery: The Years of Defeat: Europe and North Africa, 1939–1941, Woolwich: Royal Artillery Institution, 1988/London: Brasseys, 1996, ISBN 1-85753-080-2.
- Joslen, H. F. (2003) [1960]. Orders of Battle: Second World War, 1939–1945. Uckfield, East Sussex: Naval and Military Press. ISBN 978-1-84342-474-1.
- Norman E. H. Litchfield, The Territorial Artillery 1908–1988 (Their Lineage, Uniforms and Badges), Nottingham: Sherwood Press, 1992, ISBN 0-9508205-2-0.
- Edward M. Spiers, The Army and Society 1815–1914, London: Longmans, 1980, ISBN 0-582-48565-7.
- Ray Westlake, Tracing the Rifle Volunteers, Barnsley: Pen and Sword, 2010, ISBN 978-1-84884-211-3.

== Online sources ==
- British Army units from 1945 on
- British Military History
- The Long, Long Trail
- Orders of Battle at Patriot Files
- The Regimental Warpath 1914–1918
- The Royal Artillery 1939–45
