= Donald Ray (cricketer) =

English cricketer and British Army officer

Personal information
- Full name: Donald William Garnham Ray
- Born: 2 July 1903; Wimborne, Dorset, England
- Died: 12 July 1944 (aged 41) on board a hospital ship off Southampton, Hampshire, England
- Batting: Unknown
- Role: Wicket-keeper

Domestic team information
- Years: Team
- 1931: Marylebone Cricket Club

Career statistics
Competition	First-class
Matches	1
Runs scored	2
Batting average	1.00
100s/50s	–/–
Top score	2
Catches/stumpings	1/2
- Source: Cricinfo, 15 November 2020

Donald William Garnham Ray (2 July 1903 – 12 July 1944) was an English first-class cricketer and British Army officer.

Ray was born at Wimborne in July 1903 to Walter John Orbell and Marie Estelle Ray. He was educated at Wellington College. After leaving the college, Ray decided on a career in the military and went up to the Royal Military College. He graduated into the Royal Fusiliers as a second lieutenant in August 1923, before gaining the rank of lieutenant in August 1925. He played first-class cricket for the Marylebone Cricket Club (MCC) against the British Army cricket team at Lord's in 1931. Playing as a wicket-keeper, he batted twice in the match, being dismissed without scoring in the MCC first innings by John Walford, while in their second innings he was dismissed for 2 runs by John Stephenson. In his capacity as wicket-keeper, he took a single catch and made two stumpings.

Ray married Marcy Standish-Barry at Holy Trinity Brompton in December 1932. He was promoted to captain in July 1934, later serving in British India, before being appointed an adjutant in British Ceylon with the Ceylon Planters' Rifle Corps. He returned home at the beginning of the Second World War, serving with the British Expeditionary Force during the Fall of France in 1940. He returned to France in June 1944, this time commanding 6th Battalion, Hampshire Regiment on D-Day. Ray was wounded in action near Caen in July and was evacuated to a hospital ship to return to England for treatment. However, he died of his wounds on 12 July, before the ship could dock at Southampton.
