= HMS Blandford (1741) =

Royal Navy Ship

History

United Kingdom
- Name: HMS Blandford
- Ordered: 27 December 1740
- Builder: Thomas West, Deptford
- Launched: 2 October 1741
- Completed: 8 December 1741

General characteristics
- Class & type: Modified 1733 Establishment Group 6th rate frigate
- Length: 109 ft 0 in (33.2 m) (overall)*89 ft 8.25 in (27.3 m) (keel)
- Beam: 30 ft 10.5 in (9.4 m)
- Propulsion: Sails
- Complement: 140
- Armament: 24 guns:*Upper Deck: 20 x 9-pdrs *Lower Deck: 2 x 9-pdrs*Quarter Deck: 3 x 3-pdrs

HMS Blandford was a 24 gun sixth-rate frigate first commissioned under Captain Robert Young in October 1741. She was one of the two modified 1733 Establishment Group sixth rates built, along with HMS Greyhound. She served through the Seven Years' War but did not see any fleet actions.

== Career ==
HMS Blandford cruising under Captain Edward Dodd took three French privateers, Le Saint-Pierre 28 October 1746, Le Brave 24 January 1747 and Le Piquenot 27 February 1748. On 25 March 1757 the ship under Commander Penhallow Cuming took privateer Le Triomphant.

The ship was taken by a French squadron while sailing for the Leeward Islands on 13 August 1755 as a result of the French and Indian War. This was done in retaliation for Edward Boscawen’s Action of 8 June 1755 where French warships were seized. She was released on 20 September 1755.

== Étoile du Roy ==
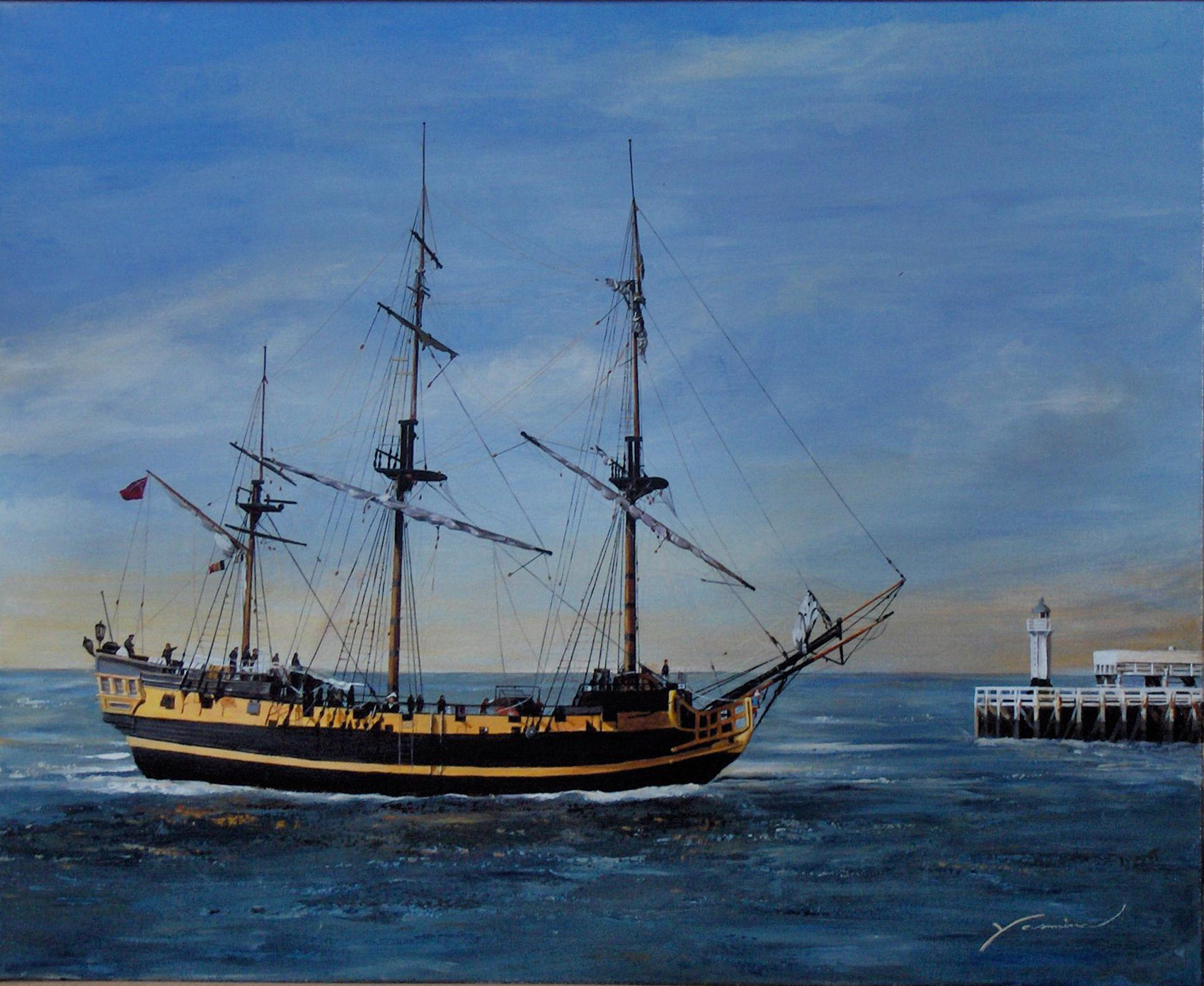
Painting of Grand Turk entering the harbour of Ostend, Belgium (Yasmina, 2008)

The Étoile du Roy formerly the Grand Turk was constructed as a replica frigate for the ITV series Hornblower where she stands in for HMS Indefatigable. She is a copy of HMS Blandford.
