= Southwick Cartularies =

The Southwick Cartularies was an early 13th-century chronicle which listed the wealthiest people in England at the time. The chronicle also contained the first ever reference to the city of Portsmouth.
