= Portsmouth power station =

Former power station in England

- Country: United Kingdom
- Location: Portsmouth, Hampshire
- Coordinates: 50°47′38″N 01°06′16″W
- Status: Decommissioned and demolished
- Construction began: 1891
- Commission date: 1894
- Decommission date: 1977
- Owners: Portsmouth Corporation (1894–1948); British Electricity Authority (1948–1955); Central Electricity Authority (1955–1957); Central Electricity Generating Board (1958–1977)
- Operator: As owner

Thermal power station
- Primary fuel: Coal
- Turbine technology: Steam turbines
- Chimneys: 2 (91 m tall)
- Cooling towers: None
- Cooling source: Seawater

Power generation
- Units operational: 4 x 30 MW (by 1952)
- Make and model: British Thomson-Houston 30 MW
- Units decommissioned: All
- Nameplate capacity: 133 MW (1958)
- Annual net output: 530 GWh (1954)

Portsmouth power station supplied electricity to Portsmouth and the surrounding area from 1894 to until 1977. The power station was built and operated by Portsmouth Corporation and started supplying electricity on 6 June 1894. It was located in St Mary Street and was redeveloped several times: including major rebuilds in 1927–29 and in 1938–1952, and expanded into a larger plot. The power station was closed in 1977; the two chimneys were demolished in 1981 and the main buildings in 1982.

== History ==
In 1890 Portsmouth Corporation applied for a provisional order to generate and supply electricity to the town of Portsmouth, Hampshire. The Portsmouth Electric Lighting Order 1890 was granted by the Board of Trade and was confirmed by Parliament through the Electric Lighting Orders (No. 5) Act 1890 (53 & 54 Vict. c. cxc). The Portsmouth Corporation electricity undertaking constructed a pioneering power station on a site in St Mary Street (50°47′36″N 1°06′11″W).

== Equipment specification ==
The first plant and equipment was designed and installed by Sebastian Ziani de Ferranti and comprised horizontal and vertical compound engines and an early example of a Parsons steam turbine these were coupled directly to Ferranti and Parsons dynamos. The machines were supplied by five Lancashire boilers each with an evaporative output of 5,000 lb/h (2,268 kg/h) of steam. There were also motor generators and batteries. In 1898 the electricity generating capacity was 1,386 kW. There were estimated to be 39,407 lamps of 8-candle power plus 257 public lamps. By 1914 the output capacity of the plant was 3,300 kW.

=== Post-war plant ===
Following the First World War new plant was installed to meet the growing demand for electricity. By 1923 the plant comprised:

- Coal-fired boilers generating a maximum of 120,000 lb/h (15.12 kg/s) of steam, these supplied steam to:
- Generators
  - 1 × 200 kW reciprocating engine
  - 1 × 500 kW reciprocating engine
  - 3 × 650 kW steam turbines
  - 1 × 1,000 kW steam turbine
  - 1 × 2,000 kW steam turbine
  - 1 × 4,000 kW steam turbine

These provided a total generating capacity of 9,650 kW.

Camber Dock was opened for colliers to deliver coal to the power station.

Electricity supplies were available to consumers as single phase, 50 Hz AC at 200 and 100 Volts, and 3-phase, 50 Hz AC at 240 and 415 Volts.

=== Low pressure plant 1927 ===
New low pressure (LP) generating sets were commissioned in 1927–29.

- Boilers
  - 1 × Babcock CTM 88,000 lb/h, operating at 250 psi and 650 °F (11.09 kg/s, 17.2 bar and 343 °C)
  - 2 × Babcock & Wilcox CTM each 50,000 lb/h, operating at 250 psi and 650 °F (6.3 kg/s, 17.2 bar and 343 °C), the boilers supplied steam to:
- Turbo-alternators
  - 2 × GEC /Fraser and Chalmers 10 MW sets, operating at inlet steam conditions of 245 psi and 700 °F (16.9 bar and 371 °C).

=== High pressure plant 1938 ===
High pressure (HP) plant was commissioned in stages: August 1938, September 1941, December 1948, and March 1952. It comprised:

- Boilers
  - 2 × Clarke Chapman marine type each 123,000 lb/h, (15.5 kg/s)
  - 5 × Bennis quadsum each 165,000 lb/h, (20.8 kg/s)
  - 2 × Mitchell each 180,000 lb/h, (22.7 kg/s)

All the boilers worked at 625 psi and 850 °F, (43.1 bar and 454 °C).

- Turbo-alternators
  - 4 × British Thomson-Houston 30 MW sets, operating at inlet steam conditions of 245 psi and 700 °F (16.9 bar and 371 °C).

Cooling water for the Hick-Hargreaves condensers was abstracted from the tidal harbour. The water flowrate was 6.6 million gallons per hour (30,004 m^{3}/h).

The turbine hall was 429 feet, by 65 feet by 48 feet tall (131 m × 19.8 m × 14.6 m), and has been claimed to contain one million bricks.

== Operating data ==
In 1898 the maximum electricity demand was 849 kW and the undertaking sold 981.273 MWh of electricity.

The operating dating data for 1921–23 is shown in the table:

Portsmouth power station operating data 1921–23
Electricity Use	Units	Year		
Electricity Use	Units	1921	1922	1923
Lighting and domestic use	MWh	3,067.7	3,125.4	4,341.9
Public lighting use	MWh	590.8	496.86	606.7
Power use	MWh	1,230.3	1,591.9	1,241.3
Total use	MWh	4,885.8	5,214.1	6,190.0
Load and connected load
Maximum load	kW	3,410	4,050	4,700
Total connections	kW	10,200	12,000	13,064
Load factor	%	19.8	18.0	18.7
Financial
Revenue from sales of current	£	–	117,440	128,291
Surplus of revenue over expenses	£	–	38,472	55,657

Under the terms of the Electricity (Supply) Act 1926 (16 & 17 Geo. 5. c. 51) the Central Electricity Board (CEB) was established in 1926. The CEB identified high efficiency 'selected' power station that would supply electricity most effectively; Portsmouth was designated a selected station. The CEB also constructed the National Grid (1927–33) to connect power stations within a region.

=== Operating data for 1946 ===
Portsmouth power station operating data, 1946

Year	Load factor per cent	Max output capacity MW	Electricity supplied GWh	Thermal efficiency per cent
1946	31.2	87.36	238.79	18.73

Upon nationalisation of the British electricity supply industry in 1948 under the provisions of the Electricity Act 1947 (10 & 11 Geo. 6. c. 54) the Portsmouth electricity undertaking was abolished, ownership of Portsmouth power station was vested in the British Electricity Authority, and subsequently the Central Electricity Authority and the Central Electricity Generating Board (CEGB). At the same time the electricity distribution and sales responsibilities of the Portsmouth electricity undertaking were transferred to the Southern Electricity Board (SEB).

=== Operating data for 1954–71 ===
Operating data for the period 1954–71 is shown in the table:

Portsmouth power station operating data, 1954–71
Year	Running hours (load factor per cent)	Max output capacity MW	Electricity supplied GWh	Thermal efficiency per cent
HP plant
1954	6975	114	498.234	24.48
1955	6796	114	492.762	24.11
1956	6775	114	451.142	23.57
1957	6651	114	472.323	24.03
1958	6509	114	333.132	22.97
LP plant
1954	3519	19	31.182	14.75
1955	2823	19	24.800	14.92
1956	2641	19	24.759	13.20
1957	1663	19	13.856	12.32
1958	1185	19	10.199	14.30
Combined output
1961	(18.3 %)	143	229.40	21.76
1962	(22.70 %)	143	269.783	22.70
1963	(27.57 %)	143	345.352	22.69
1967	(24.6 %)	143	308.023	21.15
1971	–	112	196.788	–

== Closure ==
The station was disconnected from the national grid on Sunday 20 March 1977 and decommissioned. The two chimneys were demolished in 1981 and the main buildings in 1982. The area has since been redeveloped.

== See also ==
- Timeline of the UK electricity supply industry
- List of power stations in England
