= International Festivals of the Sea =

The International Festivals of the Sea were a series of maritime festivals, which were held in various British port cities between 1996 and 2005. The festivals were intended to be celebrations of the sea, bringing together sailors, musicians, artists, entertainers, ships and boats from all points of the compass.

== History ==
The first International Festival of the Sea took place in Bristol in 1996, and the key theme was John Cabot's pioneering voyage of discovery to the Americas. As part of the festival, a replica of Cabot's ship, the Matthew, was dedicated prior to its reenactment of Cabot's voyage the following year.

The relative success of the first festival, taken with the declining numbers of visitors to Navy Days, encouraged the Royal Navy to invite the festival to Portsmouth in 1998 and 2001. Unlike the Bristol event, the Portsmouth events had a strong naval component, and effectively combined the maritime heritage aspects of the first festival with the naval public relations aspects of the old Navy Days. Both events were highly successful with over 200,000 visitors to each.

The 2003 festival was held in Edinburgh's port district of Leith. The 2005 International Festival of the Sea returned to Portsmouth as part of the Trafalgar 200 and Sea Britain 2005 festivities to mark the 200th Anniversary of the Battle of Trafalgar.

The 2005 Festival of the Sea was the last major event of its type, however, the 2017 Poole Maritime Festival in conjunction with European Maritime Day is set to revive the tradition of popular maritime festivals on 18 to 21 May 2017.

== List of festivals ==
- International Festival of the Sea, 1996 - Bristol
- International Festival of the Sea, 1998 - Portsmouth
- International Festival of the Sea, 2001 - Portsmouth
- International Festival of the Sea, 2003 - Leith, Edinburgh
- International Festival of the Sea, 2005 - Portsmouth
