= International Festival of the Sea, 2001 =

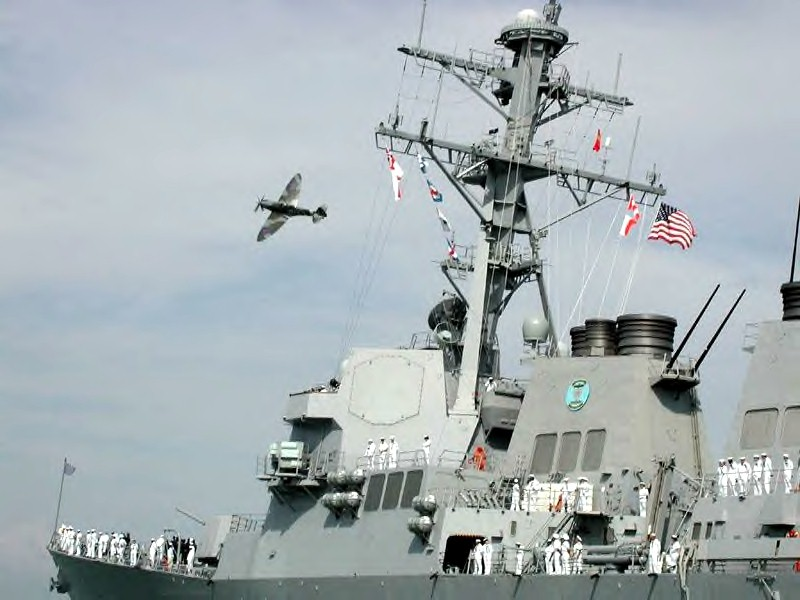
A Spitfire welcomes USS Winston S. Churchill to Portsmouth for the Festival of the Sea

The International Festival of the Sea was held at H.M. Naval Base, Portsmouth between 24 and 27 August 2001. It was the third in a series of International Festivals of the Sea held in the United Kingdom since 1996. The event allowed people to walk around the Naval Base, to go on board many of the visiting vessels, including several vessels belonging to the Royal Navy. It also allowed people to visit the historic dockyard, including HMS Victory and Mary Rose. There were also many maritime displays, street entertainers, military bands, music concerts and unique shops.

According to the event's patron, Anne, Princess Royal, the festival was a "celebration of all things maritime".

== History ==
The first International Festival of the Sea took place in Bristol in 1996 with the Royal Navy as primary participants. Following the declining numbers of visitors to Portsmouth Navy Day's encouraged the Royal Navy to invite the festival to Portsmouth for the first time in 1998. The event had over 200,000 visitors and returned in 2001.

== Special events ==
Many events were held during the four days of the festival. Most of the spectacular events were military in genre, some displaying the most modern of hardware, whilst others showed of historical equipment. Other events, such as concerts and children's activities.

=== Operation Island Storm ===
The main military event of the festival was Operation Island Storm, a demonstration of British military ability confronted by a situation most likely in today's world. It involved a hostage situation off the West African coast, and the Royal Marines operation to free them.

A specially constructed island in the harbour was the site of the action, which was held every afternoon of the event. It was the biggest display of British military hardware during the whole of 2001.

== Lists of ships ==
Numerous ships of different capacities and from various nations attended the event.

These lists are not complete

=== Royal Navy ships ===
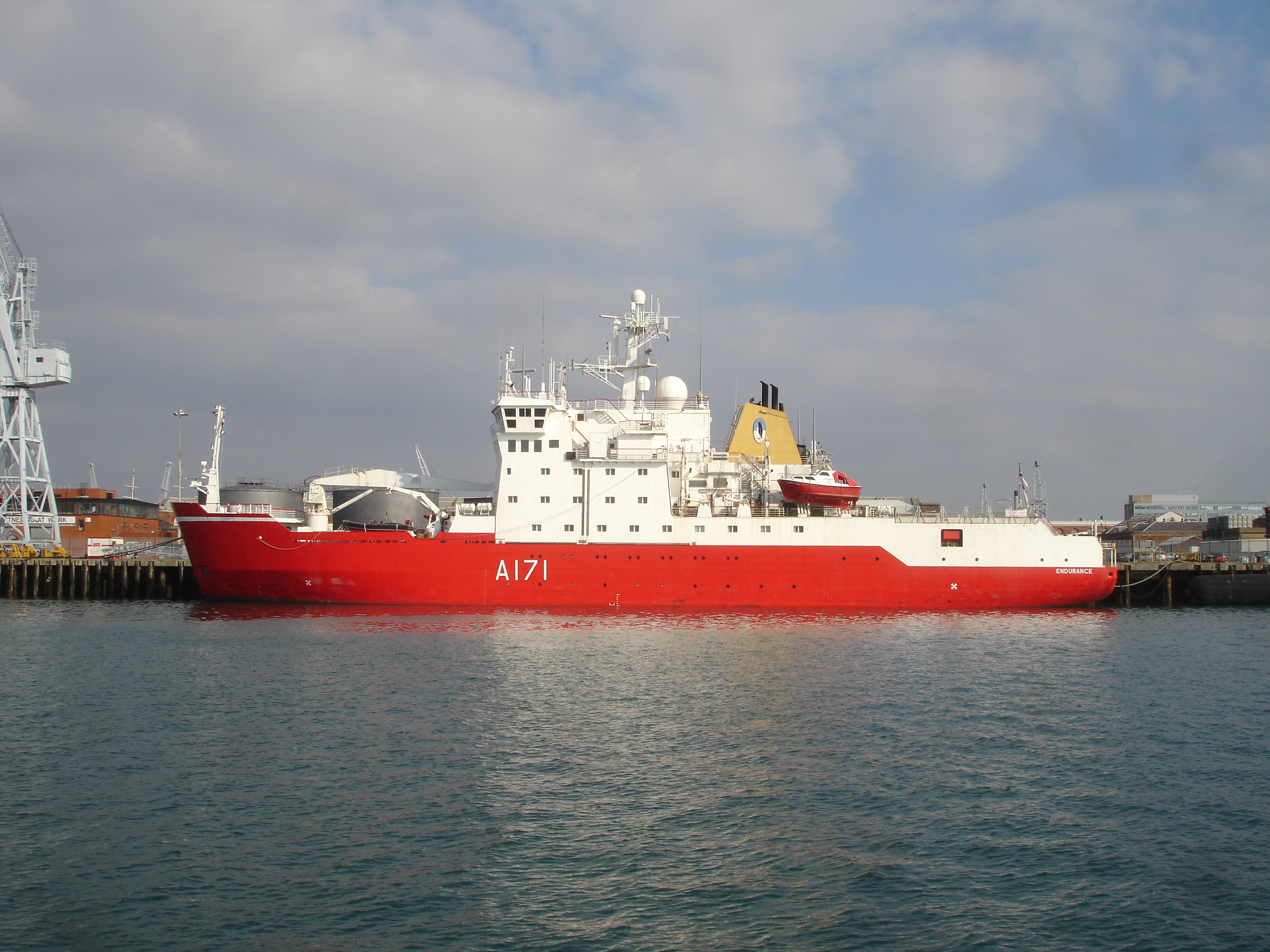
HMS Endurance was at the festival

- Type 42 destroyer
  - HMS Newcastle
  - HMS Glasgow
  - HMS Exeter
  - HMS Southampton
  - HMS Nottingham
  - HMS York
- Type 23 frigate
  - HMS Lancaster
  - HMS Westminster
  - HMS Richmond
  - HMS Grafton
  - HMS Marlborough
- Invincible-class aircraft carrier
  - HMS Illustrious
- Sandown-class minehunter
  - HMS Grimsby
  - HMS Sandown
- Archer-class patrol vessel
  - HMS Dasher
  - HMS Puncher
- Other Ships
  - HMS Endurance
  - RFA Argus
  - RV Triton

=== Ships of other navies ===
- USS Winston S. Churchill – United States Navy
- De Grasse – French Navy
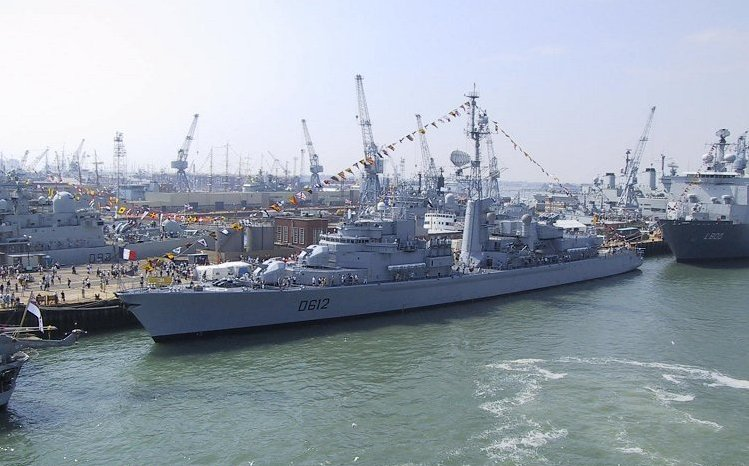
  The French frigate De Grasse (D 612)
- HMCS Halifax – Royal Canadian Navy
- NRP Corte-Real – Portuguese Navy

=== Tall ships ===
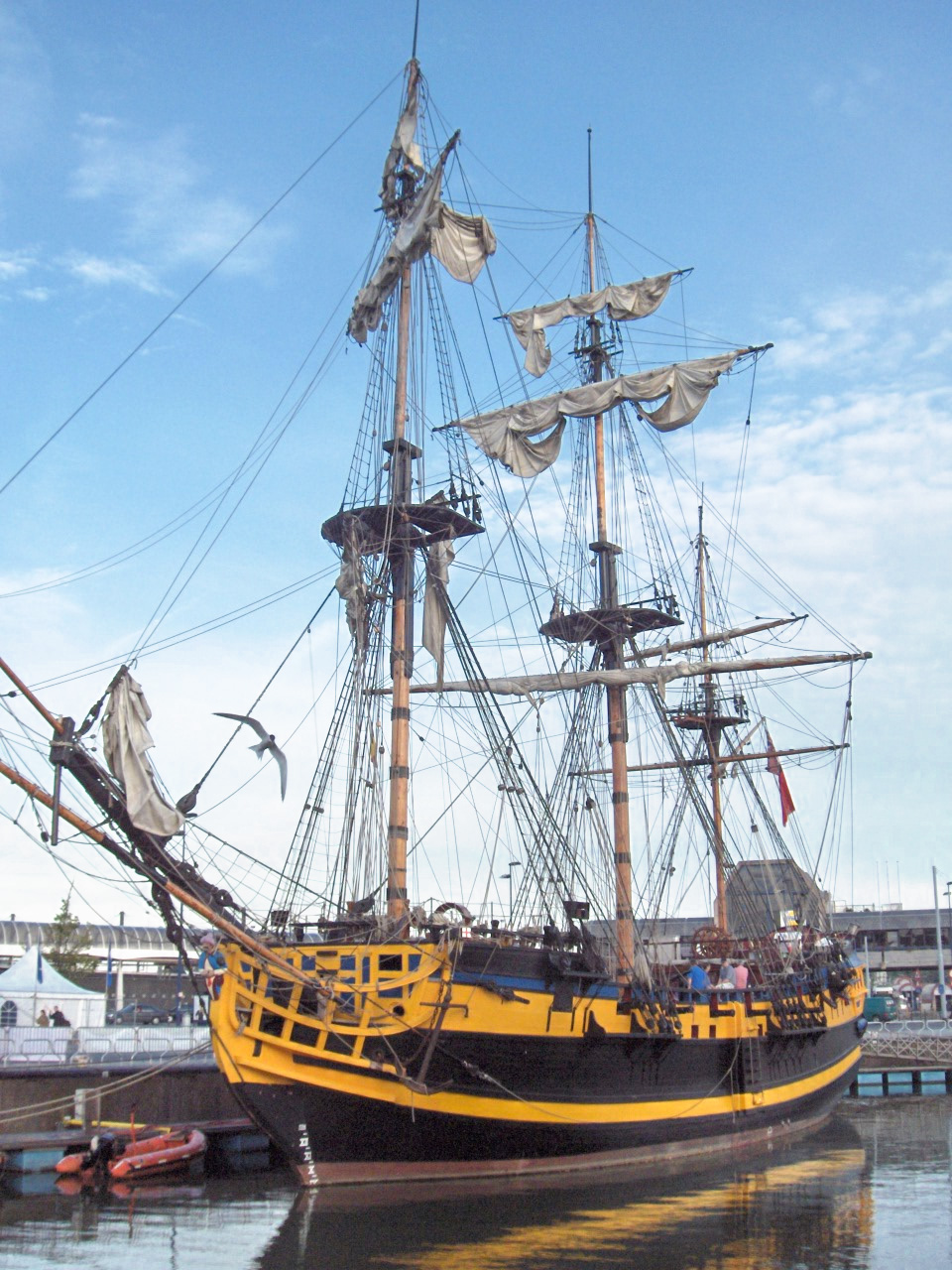
Grand Turk was one of the tall ships in attendance

- Albatros – The Netherlands
- Artemis – The Netherlands
- Astrid – United Kingdom
- Christian Radich – Norway
- Cisne Branco – Brazil
- Cuauhtémoc – Mexico
- Dar Młodzieży – Poland
- Europa – The Netherlands
- Grand Turk – United Kingdom
- Granvillaise – France
- Kaliakra – Bulgaria
- La Recouvrance – France
- Lord Nelson – United Kingdom
- Matthew – United Kingdom
- Mir – Russia
- Oosterschelde – The Netherlands
- ORP Iskra – Poland
- Palinuro – Italy
- Pogoria – Poland
- Prince William – United Kingdom
- Renard – France
- Royalist – United Kingdom
- STS Sedov – Russia
- Shabab Oman – Oman
- Shtandart – Russia
- Sorlandet – Norway
- Statsraad Lehmkhul – Norway
- Swan fan Makkum – The Netherlands
- Zenobe Gramme – Belgium

== Sponsors ==
- BAE Systems
- Rolls-Royce
- BP
- Vosper Thornycroft
- Royal Mail
- Raytheon Systems Limited
- Portsmouth Historic Dockyard
- Portsmouth City Council
