= Connaught Drill Hall =

Former English military installation

Stanhope Road drill hall
- Portsmouth
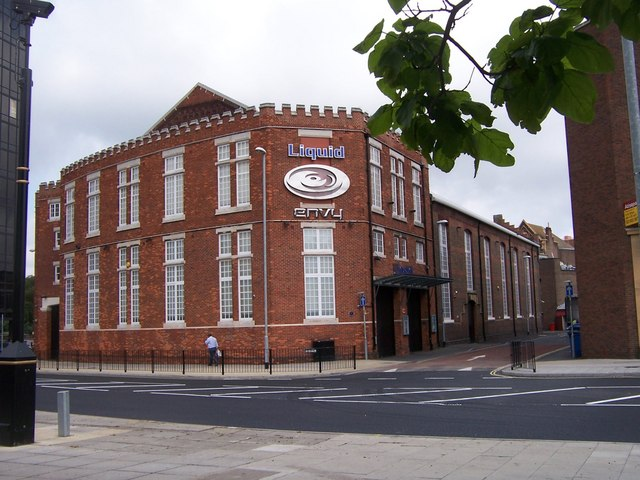
- Stanhope Road drill hall

Site information
- Type: Drill hall

Location
- Location in Hampshire
- Coordinates: 50.79945°N 1.09196°W

Site history
- Built: 1901
- Built for: War Office
- In use: 1901–1990s

Connaught Drill Hall, sometimes known as the Stanhope Road drill hall, is a former military installation in Portsmouth, Hampshire. It is a Grade II listed building.

== History ==
The building was designed by Alfred Bone, a local architect, as the headquarters of the 3rd (Duke of Connaught's Own) Volunteer Battalion, The Hampshire Regiment, which had relocated from the Alfred Road drill hall. It was opened by Lord Northbrook in March 1901. The 3rd (Duke of Connaught's Own) Volunteer Battalion evolved to become the 6th Battalion, The Hampshire Regiment in 1908. The battalion was mobilised at the drill hall in August 1914 before being deployed to India. The battalion converted to the 59th (6th Duke of Connaught's Own) Battalion, The Hampshire Regiment) Anti-Tank Regiment, Royal Artillery in 1938.

The drill hall was damaged during the Second World War and had to be rebuilt before being able to accommodate the 383rd (Duke of Connaught's Royal Hampshire) Regiment, Royal Artillery in 1947. This unit went on to become A (Duke of Connaught's) Company, 2nd Battalion, Wessex Volunteers at Portsmouth in 1967 and C (Duke of Connaught's) Company, 6th/7th (Volunteer) Battalion, The Princess of Wales's Royal Regiment in 1992. After the unit left the drill hall in the late 1990s, it was decommissioned and converted to a nightclub.
