= List of Armed Services Editions =

Armed Services Editions (ASEs) were small paperback books of fiction and nonfiction that were distributed in the American military during World War II. From 1943 to 1947, some 122 million copies of more than 1,300 ASE titles were published and printed by the Council on Books in Wartime (CBW) and distributed to service members, with whom they were enormously popular.

This list of all 1,322 ASEs is based, unless otherwise indicated, on the data in appendix B to Molly Guptill Manning's book When Books Went To War (2014), a history of the ASEs and related efforts to promote wartime reading in the United States. Some full author names are taken from the list in the appendix to John Y. Cole's study of the ASEs from 1984. The notes about whether a book was a reprint (there were 99 reprints of reprints), abridged, or a "made" book (special anthologies of stories or verse, many of which were compiled by Louis Untermeyer) are based on the indications in Editions for the Armed Services, Inc.: A History (1948).

== List ==
No.	No. in series	Author	Title	Series	Notes
1	A-1	Leonard Q. Ross	The Education of Hyman Kaplan	A (Sep. 1943)	
2	A-2	Joseph C. Grew	Report from Tokyo	A (Sep. 1943)	
3	A-3	Ogden Nash	Good Intentions	A (Sep. 1943)	
4	A-4	Kathryn Forbes	Mama's Bank Account	A (Sep. 1943)	
5	A-5	Robert Carse	There Go the Ships	A (Sep. 1943)	
6	A-6	Rose C. Feld	Sophie Halenczik, American	A (Sep. 1943)	
7	A-7	Theodore Pratt	Mr. Winkle Goes to War	A (Sep. 1943)	
8	A-8	Charles Dickens	Oliver Twist	A (Sep. 1943)	
9	A-9	John Steinbeck	Tortilla Flat	A (Sep. 1943)	
10	A-10	John R. Tunis	World Series	A (Sep. 1943)	
11	A-11	James Thurber	My World and Welcome to It	A (Sep. 1943)	
12	A-12	Frank Gruber	Peace Marshal	A (Sep. 1943)	
13	A-13	H. L. Mencken	Heathen Days	A (Sep. 1943)	
14	A-14	C. S. Forester	The Ship	A (Sep. 1943)	
15	A-15	William Saroyan	The Human Comedy	A (Sep. 1943)	
16	A-16	Antoine de Saint-Exupéry	Wind, Sand, and Stars	A (Sep. 1943)	
17	A-17	John Bartlet Brebner and Allan Nevins	The Making of Modern Britain	A (Sep. 1943)	
18	A-18	Philip K. Hitti	The Arabs	A (Sep. 1943)	
19	A-19	Howard Fast	The Unvanquished	A (Sep. 1943)	
20	A-20	Albert Q. Maisel	Miracles of Military Medicine	A (Sep. 1943)	
21	A-21	Herbert Agar	A Time for Greatness	A (Sep. 1943)	
22	A-22	Graham Greene	The Ministry of Fear	A (Sep. 1943)	
23	A-23	Max Herzberg, Merrill Paine and Austin Works, eds.	Happy Landings	A (Sep. 1943)	
24	A-24	Herman Melville	Typee	A (Sep. 1943)	
25	A-25	Rackham Holt	George Washington Carver	A (Sep. 1943)	
26	A-26	Joseph Conrad	Lord Jim	A (Sep. 1943)	
27	A-27	Carl Sandburg	Storm over the Land	A (Sep. 1943)	
28	A-28	Hervey Allen	Action at Aquila	A (Sep. 1943)	
29	A-29	Ethel Vance	Reprisal	A (Sep. 1943)	Ethel Vance and Grace Zaring Stone were the same person
30	A-30	Jack Goodman, ed.	The Fireside Book of Dog Stories	A (Sep. 1943)	
31	B-31	Rose Wilder Lane	Let the Hurricane Roar	B (Oct. 1943)	
32	B-32	Fred Herman	Dynamite Cargo	B (Oct. 1943)	
33	B-33	Robert Frost	Come In and Other Poems	B (Oct. 1943)	
34	B-34	Edith Wharton	Ethan Frome	B (Oct. 1943)	
35	B-35	Mary Lasswell	Suds in Your Eye	B (Oct. 1943)	
36	B-36	Peter Field	Fight for Powder Valley!	B (Oct. 1943)	
37	B-37	Cornelia Otis Skinner and Emily Kimbrough	Our Hearts Were Young and Gay	B (Oct. 1943)	
38	B-38	MacKinlay Kantor	Gentle Annie	B (Oct. 1943)	
39	B-39	Robert Benchley	Benchley Beside Himself	B (Oct. 1943)	
40	B-40	William Sloane	To Walk the Night	B (Oct. 1943)	
41	B-41	Edmund Gilligan	The Gaunt Woman	B (Oct. 1943)	
42	B-42	Alan Le May	Winter Range	B (Oct. 1943)	
43	B-43	Arthur Henry Gooden	Painted Buttes	B (Oct. 1943)	
44	B-44	Rosemary Taylor	Chicken Every Sunday	B (Oct. 1943)	
45	B-45	P. Lowe	Father and Glorious Descendant	B (Oct. 1943)	
46	B-46	H. Allen Smith	Life in a Putty Knife Factory	B (Oct. 1943)	
47	B-47	Archie Binns	Lightship	B (Oct. 1943)	
48	B-48	Hartzell Spence	Get Thee Behind Me	B (Oct. 1943)	
49	B-49	Mary O'Hara	My Friend Flicka	B (Oct. 1943)	
50	B-50	Henry C. Cassidy	Moscow Dateline	B (Oct. 1943)	
51	B-51	Dorothy Macardle	The Uninvited	B (Oct. 1943)	
52	B-52	Walter D. Edmonds	Rome Haul	B (Oct. 1943)	
53	B-53	Struthers Burt	Powder River	B (Oct. 1943)	
54	B-54	Louis Adamic	The Native's Return	B (Oct. 1943)	
55	B-55	Marjorie Kinnan Rawlings	The Yearling	B (Oct. 1943)	
56	B-56	Stefan Heym	Hostages	B (Oct. 1943)	
57	B-57	Hubert Herring	Good Neighbors	B (Oct. 1943)	
58	B-58	Merrill Denison	Klondike Mike	B (Oct. 1943)	
59	B-59	Marcus Goodrich	Delilah	B (Oct. 1943)	
60	B-60	Peter Freuchen	Arctic Adventure	B (Oct. 1943)	
61	C-61	Alan H. Brodrick	North Africa	C (Nov. 1943)	
62	C-62	Conrad Richter	The Sea of Grass	C (Nov. 1943)	
63	C-63	J. H. Robinson	The Mind in the Making	C (Nov. 1943)	
64	C-64	Voltaire	Candide	C (Nov. 1943)	
65	C-65	Stewart Edward White	The Forest	C (Nov. 1943)	
66	C-66	Nelson C. Nye	Pistols for Hire	C (Nov. 1943)	
67	C-67	Max Beerbohm	Seven Men	C (Nov. 1943)	
68	C-68	Vereen Bell	Swamp Water	C (Nov. 1943)	
69	C-69	Charles Courtney	Unlocking Adventure	C (Nov. 1943)	
70	C-70	Booth Tarkington	Penrod	C (Nov. 1943)	
71	C-71	W. H. Hudson	Green Mansions	C (Nov. 1943)	
72	C-72	Clarence E. Mulford	Hopalong Cassidy Serves a Writ	C (Nov. 1943)	
73	C-73	Walter Lippmann	U.S. Foreign Policy	C (Nov. 1943)	
74	C-74	DuBose Heyward	Star Spangled Virgin	C (Nov. 1943)	
75	C-75	J. B. Priestley	Black-Out in Gretley	C (Nov. 1943)	
76	C-76	Mark Twain	The Adventures of Tom Sawyer	C (Nov. 1943)	
77	C-77	Stephen Vincent Benét	Short Stories	C (Nov. 1943)	
78	C-78	Betty Wason	Miracle in Hellas	C (Nov. 1943)	
79	C-79	Frank Meier	Fathoms Below	C (Nov. 1943)	
80	C-80	Ernestine Hill	Australian Frontier	C (Nov. 1943)	
81	C-81	George R. Stewart	Storm	C (Nov. 1943)	
82	C-82	Gontran de Poncins	Kabloona	C (Nov. 1943)	
83	C-83	Hervey Allen	The Forest and the Fort	C (Nov. 1943)	
84	C-84	Herbert Quick	The Hawkeye	C (Nov. 1943)	
85	C-85	J. W. Thomason	...And a Few Marines	C (Nov. 1943)	
86	C-86	John Selby	Starbuck	C (Nov. 1943)	
87	C-87	Edison Marshall	Great Smith	C (Nov. 1943)	
88	C-88	Esther Forbes	Paul Revere and the World He Lived In	C (Nov. 1943)	
89	C-89	Manuel Komroff	Coronet	C (Nov. 1943)	
90	C-90	John Steinbeck	The Grapes of Wrath	C (Nov. 1943)	
91	D-91	James Hilton	The Story of Dr. Wassell	D (Dec. 1943)	
92	D-92	Charles Spalding and Otis Carney	Love at First Flight	D (Dec. 1943)	
93	D-93	Stewart E. White	Blazed Trail Stories	D (Dec. 1943)	
94	D-94	W. C. Tuttle	Tumbling River Range	D (Dec. 1943)	
95	D-95	Berry Fleming	Colonel Effingham's Raid	D (Dec. 1943)	
96	D-96	Martha Albrand	Without Orders	D (Dec. 1943)	
97	D-97	Willa Cather	Death Comes for the Archbishop	D (Dec. 1943)	
98	D-98	Conrad Richter	The Trees	D (Dec. 1943)	
99	D-99	Mark Van Doren, ed.	The Night of the Summer Solstice	D (Dec. 1943)	
100	D-100	Clarence Budington Kelland	Valley of the Sun	D (Dec. 1943)	
101	D-101	Elizabeth Daly	Evidence of Things Seen	D (Dec. 1943)	
102	D-102	Joseph Hergesheimer	Java Head	D (Dec. 1943)	
103	D-103	George S. Bryan	Mystery Ship	D (Dec. 1943)	
104	D-104	Gordon S. Seagrave	Burma Surgeon	D (Dec. 1943)	
105	D-105	Harry Emerson Fosdick	On Being a Real Person	D (Dec. 1943)	
106	D-106	Hans Zinsser	Rats, Lice, and History	D (Dec. 1943)	
107	D-107	Charles Allen Smart	R. F. D.	D (Dec. 1943)	
108	D-108	Joseph Mitchell	McSorley's Wonderful Saloon	D (Dec. 1943)	
109	D-109	Bellamy Partridge	Country Lawyer	D (Dec. 1943)	
110	D-110	Mark Twain	The Adventures of Huckleberry Finn	D (Dec. 1943)	
111	D-111	Joseph Shearing	Blanche Fury	D (Dec. 1943)	
112	D-112	Marjorie Kinnan Rawlings	Cross Creek	D (Dec. 1943)	
113	D-113	A. J. Cronin	The Keys of the Kingdom	D (Dec. 1943)	
114	D-114	John T. Whitaker	We Cannot Escape History	D (Dec. 1943)	
115	D-115	William Wister Haines	Slim	D (Dec. 1943)	
116	D-116	Martha Foley, ed.	The Best American Short Stories, 1942	D (Dec. 1943)	
117	D-117	Betty Smith	A Tree Grows in Brooklyn	D (Dec. 1943)	
118	D-118	Lloyd C. Douglas	The Robe	D (Dec. 1943)	
119	D-119	F. Van Wyck Mason	Rivers of Glory	D (Dec. 1943)	
120	D-120	John P. Marquand	So Little Time	D (Dec. 1943)	
121	E-121	Phil Stong	State Fair	E (Jan. 1944)	
122	E-122	Ralph Waldo Emerson	Seven Essays	E (Jan. 1944)	
123	E-123	W. C. Tuttle	Ghost Trails	E (Jan. 1944)	
124	E-124	Arthur Henry Gooden	The Range Hawk	E (Jan. 1944)	
125	E-125	Frank H. Spearman	The Mountain Divide	E (Jan. 1944)	
126	E-126	Bertha Damon	A Sense of Humus	E (Jan. 1944)	
127	E-127	Alexandre Pernikoff	"Bushido": The Anatomy of Terror	E (Jan. 1944)	
128	E-128	W. Somerset Maugham	The Moon and Sixpence	E (Jan. 1944)	
129	E-129	Ernest Haycox	Saddle and Ride	E (Jan. 1944)	
130	E-130	Earl Derr Biggers	Seven Keys to Baldpate	E (Jan. 1944)	
131	E-131	J. D. Ratcliff, ed.	Science Yearbook of 1943	E (Jan. 1944)	
132	E-132	Julian Duguid	Green Hell	E (Jan. 1944)	
133	E-133	C. S. Forester	A Ship of the Line	E (Jan. 1944)	
134	E-134	George R. Stewart	Ordeal by Hunger	E (Jan. 1944)	
135	E-135	Myron Brinig	The Gambler Takes a Wife	E (Jan. 1944)	
136	E-136	Charles Grayson, ed.	Stories for Men	E (Jan. 1944)	
137	E-137	Daphne du Maurier	Jamaica Inn	E (Jan. 1944)	
138	E-138	James Hilton	Random Harvest	E (Jan. 1944)	
139	E-139	Mark Twain	A Connecticut Yankee in King Arthur's Court	E (Jan. 1944)	
140	E-140	Edna Ferber	Cimarron	E (Jan. 1944)	
141	E-141	Osa Johnson	I Married Adventure	E (Jan. 1944)	
142	E-142	Mary Ellen Chase	Windswept	E (Jan. 1944)	
143	E-143	Louise R. Pierson	Roughly Speaking	E (Jan. 1944)	
144	E-144	Edward Ellsberg	Hell on Ice	E (Jan. 1944)	
145	E-145	James Thomas Flexner	Doctors on Horseback	E (Jan. 1944)	
146	E-146	John P. Marquand	The Late George Apley	E (Jan. 1944)	
147	E-147	Stephen Crane	Short Stories	E (Jan. 1944)	
148	E-148	David Lavender	One Man's West	E (Jan. 1944)	
149	E-149	Walter D. Edmonds	Drums Along the Mohawk	E (Jan. 1944)	
150	E-150	Henry Bellamann	King's Row	E (Jan. 1944)	
151	F-151	Donn Byrne	Messer Marco Polo	F (Feb. 1944)	
152	F-152	Antoine de Saint-Exupéry	Night Flight	F (Feb. 1944)	
153	F-153	Abraham Lincoln	The Selected Writings of Abraham Lincoln	F (Feb. 1944)	
154	F-154	John Vandercook	Black Majesty	F (Feb. 1944)	
155	F-155	Negley Farson	Going Fishing	F (Feb. 1944)	
156	F-156	Eric Knight	Lassie Come-Home	F (Feb. 1944)	
157	F-157	C. S. Forester	Flying Colors	F (Feb. 1944)	
158	F-158	Joseph Bromley	Clear the Tracks	F (Feb. 1944)	
159	F-159	H. L. Mencken	Happy Days	F (Feb. 1944)	
160	F-160	William MacLeod Raine	Border Breed	F (Feb. 1944)	
161	F-161	William Beebe	Jungle Peace	F (Feb. 1944)	
162	F-162	Bret Harte	Selected Short Stories of Bret Harte	F (Feb. 1944)	
163	F-163	Clarence E. Mulford	The Bar 20 Rides Again	F (Feb. 1944)	
164	F-164	Ernest Haycox	Border Trumpet	F (Feb. 1944)	
165	F-165	Edna Ferber	So Big	F (Feb. 1944)	
166	F-166	Beryl Markham	West with the Night	F (Feb. 1944)	
167	F-167	Agnes Keith	Land Below the Wind	F (Feb. 1944)	
168	F-168	Roy Chapman Andrews	Under a Lucky Star	F (Feb. 1944)	
169	F-169	A. E. Hertzler	The Horse and Buggy Doctor	F (Feb. 1944)	
170	F-170	Ernie Pyle	Here Is Your War	F (Feb. 1944)	
171	F-171	Stewart Edward White	The Blazed Trail	F (Feb. 1944)	
172	F-172	Ring Lardner	Round Up	F (Feb. 1944)	
173	F-173	Mari Sandoz	Old Jules	F (Feb. 1944)	
174	F-174	Mark Twain	Life on the Mississippi	F (Feb. 1944)	
175	F-175	Charles Lamb	The Essays of Charles Lamb	F (Feb. 1944)	
176	F-176	E. B. White and K. S. White	A Subtreasury of American Humor	F (Feb. 1944)	
177	F-177	Philip Guedalla	Wellington	F (Feb. 1944)	
178	F-178	William McFee	Casuals of the Sea	F (Feb. 1944)	
179	F-179	James Norman Hall	Dr. Dogbody's Leg	F (Feb. 1944)	
180	F-180	Jack London	The Sea-Wolf	F (Feb. 1944)	
181	G-181	Thorne Smith	The Glorious Pool	G (Mar. 1944)	
182	G-182	Jack London	White Fang	G (Mar. 1944)	
183	G-183	H. Allen Smith	Low Man on a Totem Pole	G (Mar. 1944)	
184	G-184	William MacLeod Raine	Trail's End	G (Mar. 1944)	
185	G-185	Willa Cather	My Ántonia	G (Mar. 1944)	
186	G-186	Alexander Woollcott	Long, Long Ago	G (Mar. 1944)	
187	G-187	Eric Knight	Sam Small Flies Again	G (Mar. 1944)	
188	G-188	Jesse Stuart	Taps for Private Tussie	G (Mar. 1944)	
189	G-189	Homer W. Smith	Kamongo	G (Mar. 1944)	
190	G-190	Eugene Manlove Rhodes	The Trusty Knaves	G (Mar. 1944)	
191	G-191	W. R. Burnett	Little Caesar	G (Mar. 1944)	
192	G-192	Robert Benchley	Inside Benchley	G (Mar. 1944)	
193	G-193	Robert H. Thouless	How to Think Straight	G (Mar. 1944)	
194	G-194	Joseph Conrad	The Mirror of the Sea	G (Mar. 1944)	
195	G-195	Luke Short	Raiders of the Rimrock	G (Mar. 1944)	
196	G-196	W. H. Hudson	A Crystal Age	G (Mar. 1944)	
197	G-197	Stephen Leacock	Laugh with Leacock	G (Mar. 1944)	
198	G-198	Rudyard Kipling	Kim	G (Mar. 1944)	
199	G-199	Donald Culross Peattie	Journey into America	G (Mar. 1944)	
200	G-200	Gladys Hasty Carroll	As the Earth Turns	G (Mar. 1944)	
201	G-201	T. R. Ybarra	Young Man of Caracas	G (Mar. 1944)	
202	G-202	MacKinlay Kantor	Arouse and Beware	G (Mar. 1944)	
203	G-203	William Haynes	This Chemical Age	G (Mar. 1944)	
204	G-204	Mary O'Hara	Thunderhead	G (Mar. 1944)	
205	G-205	Carl D. Lane	The Fleet in the Forest	G (Mar. 1944)	
206	G-206	Martha Foley, ed.	The Best American Short Stories of 1943	G (Mar. 1944)	
207	G-207	Harry Harrison Kroll	Rogues' Company	G (Mar. 1944)	
208	G-208	John P. Marquand	H. M. Pulham, Esq.	G (Mar. 1944)	
209	G-209	Herman Melville	Moby-Dick	G (Mar. 1944)	
210	G-210	George R. Stewart	East of the Giants	G (Mar. 1944)	
211	H-211	Corporal Thomas R. St. George	C/O Postmaster	H (Apr. 1944)	
212	H-212	Eugene Manlove Rhodes	Beyond the Desert	H (Apr. 1944)	
213	H-213	C. S. Forester	Payment Deferred	H (Apr. 1944)	
214	H-214	Arnold Bennett	Buried Alive	H (Apr. 1944)	
215	H-215	Stephen Vincent Benét	Western Star	H (Apr. 1944)	
216	H-216	Oliver La Farge	Laughing Boy	H (Apr. 1944)	
217	H-217	I. A. Richards, ed.	The Republic of Plato	H (Apr. 1944)	
218	H-218	Donald Culross Peattie	Forward the Nation	H (Apr. 1944)	
219	H-219	Carl Glick	Three Times I Bow	H (Apr. 1944)	
220	H-220	Cora Jarrett	Night over Fitch's Pond	H (Apr. 1944)	
221	H-221	Jack London	The Cruise of the Snark	H (Apr. 1944)	
222	H-222	Eugene Cunningham	Riders of the Night	H (Apr. 1944)	
223	H-223	Michael MacDougall	Danger in the Cards	H (Apr. 1944)	
224	H-224	Stewart H. Holbrook	Burning an Empire	H (Apr. 1944)	
225	H-225	Richard Dempewolff	Animal Reveille	H (Apr. 1944)	
226	H-226	Clark McMeekin	Red Raskall	H (Apr. 1944)	
227	H-227	Clarence E. Mulford	Corson of the J. C.	H (Apr. 1944)	
228	H-228	Kenneth Roberts	Captain Caution	H (Apr. 1944)	
229	H-229	Grace Zaring Stone	The Cold Journey	H (Apr. 1944)	Ethel Vance and Grace Zaring Stone were the same person
230	H-230	Thorne Smith	The Bishop's Jaegers	H (Apr. 1944)	
231	H-231	Franklin P. Adams, ed.	Innocent Merriment	H (Apr. 1944)	
232	H-232	Frank H. Spearman	Carmen of the Rancho	H (Apr. 1944)	
233	H-233	Robert W. Chambers	Cardigan	H (Apr. 1944)	
234	H-234	Marjorie Barrows and George Eaton	Box Office	H (Apr. 1944)	
235	H-235	Felix Riesenberg	The Pacific Ocean	H (Apr. 1944)	
236	H-236	Manuel Komroff	The Travels of Marco Polo	H (Apr. 1944)	Edited by Komroff
237	H-237	Edmund Gilligan	The Ringed Horizon	H (Apr. 1944)	
238	H-238	Charles Nordhoff and James Norman Hall	Botany Bay	H (Apr. 1944)	
239	H-239	Richard Llewellyn	How Green Was My Valley	H (Apr. 1944)	
240	H-240	Walter D. Edmonds	Chad Hanna	H (Apr. 1944)	
241	I-241	Kay Boyle	Avalanche	I (May 1944)	
242	I-242	Keith Ayling	Semper Fidelis	I (May 1944)	
243	I-243	Isabel Scott Rorick	Mr. and Mrs. Cugat	I (May 1944)	
244	I-244	Roark Bradford	Ol' Man Adam an' His Chillun	I (May 1944)	
245	I-245	W. C. Tuttle	The Mystery of the Red Triangle	I (May 1944)	
246	I-246	Emily Kimbrough	We Followed Our Hearts to Hollywood	I (May 1944)	
247	I-247	Paul B. Sears	Deserts on the March	I (May 1944)	
248	I-248	Geoffrey Household	Rogue Male	I (May 1944)	
249	I-249	William Wister Haines	High Tension	I (May 1944)	
250	I-250	Bruce Barton	The Book Nobody Knows	I (May 1944)	
251	I-251	Harry Sinclair Drago	Stagecoach Kingdom	I (May 1944)	
252	I-252	J. Middleton Murry, ed.	Stories by Katherine Mansfield: A Selection	I (May 1944)	
253	I-253	James Thurber	The Middle-Aged Man on the Flying Trapeze	I (May 1944)	
254	I-254	Ernest Haycox	Deep West	I (May 1944)	
255	I-255	Clarence Budington Kelland	Arizona	I (May 1944)	
256	I-256	Jesse James Benton	Cow by the Tail	I (May 1944)	
257	I-257	Clarence E. Mulford	Hopalong Cassidy's Protégé	I (May 1944)	
258	I-258	Karl Baarslag	Coast Guard to the Rescue	I (May 1944)	
259	I-259	Edward Ellsberg	On the Bottom	I (May 1944)	
260	I-260	W. Somerset Maugham	Ashenden	I (May 1944)	
261	I-261	Lytton Strachey	Queen Victoria	I (May 1944)	
262	I-262	Francis Griswold	Tides of Malvern	I (May 1944)	
263	I-263	Alexander Johnston	Ten ... and Out!	I (May 1944)	
264	I-264	Joseph Conrad	Victory	I (May 1944)	
265	I-265	Louis Bromfield	Mrs. Parkington	I (May 1944)	
266	I-266	Rafael Sabatini	The Sea Hawk	I (May 1944)	
267	I-267	H. L. Davis	Honey in the Horn	I (May 1944)	
268	I-268	Charlotte Brontë	Jane Eyre	I (May 1944)	
269	I-269	Esther Forbes	Paradise	I (May 1944)	
270	I-270	Howard Spring	My Son, My Son!	I (May 1944)	
271	J-271	Eugene Manlove Rhodes	The Proud Sheriff	J (Jun. 1944)	
272	J-272	William Saroyan	My Name Is Aram	J (Jun. 1944)	
273	J-273	Joseph Conrad	The Shadow-Line	J (Jun. 1944)	
274	J-274	Bob Davis	Tree Toad	J (Jun. 1944)	
275	J-275	Frederick R. Bechdolt	Riot at Red Water	J (Jun. 1944)	
276	J-276	Charles G. Finney	Past the End of the Pavement	J (Jun. 1944)	
277	J-277	Frank Graham	Lou Gehrig	J (Jun. 1944)	
278	J-278	Ring Lardner	You Know Me, Al	J (Jun. 1944)	
279	J-279	George Agnew Chamberlain	The Phantom Filly	J (Jun. 1944)	
280	J-280	Charles Snow	Sheriff of Yavisa	J (Jun. 1944)	
281	J-281	Constance Rourke	Davy Crockett	J (Jun. 1944)	
282	J-282	Richard Hughes	A High Wind in Jamaica	J (Jun. 1944)	
283	J-283	Harvey Smith	The Gang's All Here	J (Jun. 1944)	
284	J-284	Thorne Smith	Skin and Bones	J (Jun. 1944)	
285	J-285	James Gould Cozzens	The Last Adam	J (Jun. 1944)	
286	J-286	Max Brand	South of Rio Grande	J (Jun. 1944)	
287	J-287	Ward Morehouse	George M. Cohan	J (Jun. 1944)	
288	J-288	Norah Lofts	The Golden Fleece	J (Jun. 1944)	
289	J-289	Ward Weaver	End of Track	J (Jun. 1944)	
290	J-290	Paul Gallico	Selected Stories	J (Jun. 1944)	
291	J-291	Victoria Lincoln	February Hill	J (Jun. 1944)	
292	J-292	H. M. Tomlinson	The Sea and the Jungle	J (Jun. 1944)	
293	J-293	Agnes Morley Cleaveland	No Life for a Lady	J (Jun. 1944)	
294	J-294	Harnett T. Kane	The Bayous of Louisiana	J (Jun. 1944)	
295	J-295	Irene D. Paden	The Wake of the Prairie Schooner	J (Jun. 1944)	
296	J-296	William Makepeace Thackeray	Vanity Fair	J (Jun. 1944)	
297	J-297	Edgar Allan Poe	Selected Stories	J (Jun. 1944)	
298	J-298	Walter D. Edmonds	Young Ames	J (Jun. 1944)	
299	J-299	Sholem Asch	The Apostle	J (Jun. 1944)	
300	J-300	Gene Fowler	Good Night, Sweet Prince	J (Jun. 1944)	
301	J-301	Archer Butler Hulbert	Forty-Niners	J (Jun. 1944)	
302	J-302	Carolyn Thomas Foreman	Indians Abroad	J (Jun. 1944)	
303	K-1	Clarence Day	This Simian World	K (Jul. 1944)	
304	K-2	Don Marquis	The Old Soak	K (Jul. 1944)	
305	K-3	Jack London	The Call of the Wild	K (Jul. 1944)	
306	K-4	G. B. Stern	The Dark Gentleman	K (Jul. 1944)	
307	K-5	Max Brand	The Secret of Dr. Kildare	K (Jul. 1944)	
308	K-6	MacKinlay Kantor	The Noise of Their Wings	K (Jul. 1944)	
309	K-7	Walter Beebe Wilder	Bounty of the Wayside	K (Jul. 1944)	
310	K-8	Eugene Manlove Rhodes	Stepsons of Light	K (Jul. 1944)	
311	K-9	Ernest Hemingway	Short Stories	K (Jul. 1944)	
312	K-10	Robert Bright	The Life and Death of Little Jo	K (Jul. 1944)	
313	K-11	Charles H. Snow	Rebel of Ronde Valley	K (Jul. 1944)	
314	K-12	Henry Beston	The St. Lawrence	K (Jul. 1944)	
315	K-13	Stewart H. Holbrook	Ethan Allan	K (Jul. 1944)	
316	K-14	Ernest Haycox	The Wild Bunch	K (Jul. 1944)	
317	K-15	Thorne Smith	The Stray Lamb	K (Jul. 1944)	
318	K-16	O. Henry	Short Stories	K (Jul. 1944)	
319	K-17	Meyer Berger	The Eight Million	K (Jul. 1944)	
320	K-18	Willard Robertson	Moon Tide	K (Jul. 1944)	
321	K-19	Antonio de Fierro Blanco	The Journey of the Flame	K (Jul. 1944)	
322	K-20	T. R. Ybarra	Young Man of the World	K (Jul. 1944)	
323	K-21	Mildred Walker	Winter Wheat	K (Jul. 1944)	
324	K-22	Henry Seidel Canby	Walt Whitman	K (Jul. 1944)	
325	K-23	Marquis James	Andrew Jackson: The Border Captain	K (Jul. 1944)	
326	K-24	Sinclair Lewis	Babbitt	K (Jul. 1944)	
327	K-25	Arthur Train	Yankee Lawyer: The Autobiography of Ephraim Tutt	K (Jul. 1944)	
328	K-26	Herbert Asbury	Sucker's Progress	K (Jul. 1944)	
329	K-27	Lloyd C. Douglas	The Robe	K (Jul. 1944)	
330	K-28	Betty Smith	A Tree Grows in Brooklyn	K (Jul. 1944)	
331	K-29	Oliver Gramling	AP: The Story of News	K (Jul. 1944)	
332	K-30	Carl Van Doren	Benjamin Franklin	K (Jul. 1944)	
333	K-31	Laurence Sterne	Tristram Shandy	K (Jul. 1944)	
334	K-32	Albert Spalding	Rise to Follow	K (Jul. 1944)	
335	L-1	Rosemary Benét and Stephen Vincent Benét	A Book of Americans	L (Aug. 1944)	
336	L-2	James Thurber	My Life and Hard Times	L (Aug. 1944)	
337	L-3	Henry G. Lamond	Kilgour's Mare	L (Aug. 1944)	
338	L-4	James Stephens	Etched in Moonlight	L (Aug. 1944)	
339	L-5	DuBose Heyward	Porgy	L (Aug. 1944)	
340	L-6	Louis Untermeyer, ed.	Great Poems from Chaucer to Whitman	L (Aug. 1944)	
341	L-7	Louis Bromfield	What Became of Anna Bolton	L (Aug. 1944)	
342	L-8	Evan Evans	Montana Rides Again	L (Aug. 1944)	
343	L-9	William MacLeod Raine	The Sheriff's Son	L (Aug. 1944)	
344	L-10	Stephen Leacock	Happy Stories Just to Laugh At	L (Aug. 1944)	
345	L-11	Arthur Henry Gooden	Roaring River Range	L (Aug. 1944)	
346	L-12	Frances Eisenberg	There's One in Every Family	L (Aug. 1944)	
347	L-13	Max Brand	The King Bird Rides	L (Aug. 1944)	
348	L-14	Evelyn Eaton	The Sea Is So Wide	L (Aug. 1944)	
349	L-15	Herman Melville	Omoo	L (Aug. 1944)	
350	L-16	George Sessions Perry	Hackberry Cavalier	L (Aug. 1944)	
351	L-17	Thorne Smith	Turnabout	L (Aug. 1944)	
352	L-18	Carl Crow	400 Million Customers	L (Aug. 1944)	
353	L-19	Philip Wylie	Fish and Tin Fish	L (Aug. 1944)	
354	L-20	Lytton Strachey	Eminent Victorians	L (Aug. 1944)	
355	L-21	Homer Croy	Country Cured	L (Aug. 1944)	
356	L-22	George W. Gray	Science at War	L (Aug. 1944)	
357	L-23	Hervey Allen	Bedford Village	L (Aug. 1944)	
358	L-24	Joseph Shearing	The Lady and the Arsenic	L (Aug. 1944)	
359	L-25	Bram Stoker	Dracula	L (Aug. 1944)	
360	L-26	John P. Marquand	Wickford Point	L (Aug. 1944)	
361	L-27	Robert Graves	I, Claudius	L (Aug. 1944)	
362	L-28	Thomas Mann	Selected Short Stories	L (Aug. 1944)	
363	L-29	Irving Stone	Lust for Life	L (Aug. 1944)	
364	L-30	W. Somerset Maugham	Of Human Bondage	L (Aug. 1944)	
365	L-31	Archie Binns	The Land Is Bright	L (Aug. 1944)	
366	L-32	Osa Johnson	Four Years in Paradise	L (Aug. 1944)	
367	M-1	A. E. Housman	Selected Poems	M (Sep. 1944)	
368	M-2	James Thurber and E. B. White	Is Sex Necessary?	M (Sep. 1944)	
369	M-3	Saki (H. H. Munro)	Selected Short Stories	M (Sep. 1944)	
370	M-4	Robert Benchley	20,000 Leagues Under the Sea; or, David Copperfield	M (Sep. 1944)	
371	M-5	Agnes Repplier	Père Marquette	M (Sep. 1944)	
372	M-6	Eugene Manlove Rhodes	Copper Streak Trail	M (Sep. 1944)	
373	M-7	Edwin Way Teale	Dune Boy	M (Sep. 1944)	
374	M-8	James Stevens	Paul Bunyan	M (Sep. 1944)	
375	M-9	John D. Ratcliff, ed.	Science Yearbook of 1944	M (Sep. 1944)	
376	M-10	Barry Benefield	The Chicken-Wagon Family	M (Sep. 1944)	
377	M-11	Philip Wylie	The Big Ones Get Away	M (Sep. 1944)	
378	M-12	Angus McDonald	Old McDonald Had a Farm	M (Sep. 1944)	
379	M-13	Ernest Haycox	Action by Night	M (Sep. 1944)	
380	M-14	Max Brand	The Border Kid	M (Sep. 1944)	
381	M-15	Dane Coolidge	Fighting Men of the West	M (Sep. 1944)	
382	M-16	Edgar Rice Burroughs	Tarzan of the Apes	M (Sep. 1944)	
383	M-17	Harry Bedwell	The Boomer	M (Sep. 1944)	
384	M-18	Robert J. Casey	Such Interesting People	M (Sep. 1944)	
385	M-19	Eva Bruce	Call Her Rosie	M (Sep. 1944)	
386	M-20	A. R. Beverly-Giddings	Larrish Hundred	M (Sep. 1944)	
387	M-21	Henry B. Hough	Country Editor	M (Sep. 1944)	
388	M-22	David Cornel DeJong	With a Dutch Accent	M (Sep. 1944)	
389	M-23	Lillian Hellman, James Thurber, Elliott Nugent, Jerome Chodorov, Joseph Fields and Sidney Kingsley	Four Modern American Plays	M (Sep. 1944)	
390	M-24	M. Lincoln Schuster, ed.	A Treasury of the World's Great Letters	M (Sep. 1944)	
391	M-25	Christine Weston	Indigo	M (Sep. 1944)	
392	M-26	M. R. Werner	Barnum	M (Sep. 1944)	
393	M-27	Clark McMeekin	Show Me a Land	M (Sep. 1944)	
394	M-28	Captain Charles Grayson, ed.	New Stories for Men	M (Sep. 1944)	
395	M-29	Wilkie Collins	The Moonstone	M (Sep. 1944)	
396	M-30	Konrad Heiden	Der Fuehrer	M (Sep. 1944)	
397	M-31	F. Van Wyck Mason	Stars on the Sea	M (Sep. 1944)	
398	M-32	Helen MacInnes	While Still We Live	M (Sep. 1944)	
399	N-1	Mark Twain	The Mysterious Stranger	N (Oct. 1944)	
400	N-2	S. J. Perelman	The Dream Department	N (Oct. 1944)	
401	N-3	Stephen Vincent Benét	America	N (Oct. 1944)	
402	N-4	Bruce Barton	The Man Nobody Knows	N (Oct. 1944)	
403	N-5	James Stephens	The Crock of Gold	N (Oct. 1944)	
404	N-6	Carl Sandburg	Selected Poems	N (Oct. 1944)	
405	N-7	James Thurber	Let Your Mind Alone	N (Oct. 1944)	
406	N-8	E. C. Abbott and Helena Huntington Smith	We Pointed Them North	N (Oct. 1944)	
407	N-9	Ernest Haycox	Rim of the Desert	N (Oct. 1944)	
408	N-10	Alan Le May	Useless Cowboy	N (Oct. 1944)	
409	N-11	Dorothy B. Hughes	The Fallen Sparrow	N (Oct. 1944)	
410	N-12	Donald Hough	Snow Above Town	N (Oct. 1944)	
411	N-13	Robert Louis Stevenson	Kidnapped	N (Oct. 1944)	
412	N-14	W. Somerset Maugham	The Summing Up	N (Oct. 1944)	
413	N-15	Max Brand	The Iron Trail	N (Oct. 1944)	
414	N-16	Charles A. Siringo	Riata and Spurs	N (Oct. 1944)	
415	N-17	Niven Busch	Duel in the Sun	N (Oct. 1944)	
416	N-18	Theodore Pratt	Thunder Mountain	N (Oct. 1944)	
417	N-19	Lt. H. E. Riesenberg	I Dive for Treasure	N (Oct. 1944)	
418	N-20	Jack Iams	Prophet by Experience	N (Oct. 1944)	
419	N-21	Donn Byrne	Hangman's House	N (Oct. 1944)	
420	N-22	Clyde Brion Davis	The Great American Novel	N (Oct. 1944)	
421	N-23	Constance Robertson	Fire Bell in the Night	N (Oct. 1944)	
422	N-24	Robert Standish	Bonin	N (Oct. 1944)	
423	N-25	James Newman and Edward Kasner	Mathematics and the Imagination	N (Oct. 1944)	
424	N-26	Eric Linklater	Magnus Merriman	N (Oct. 1944)	
425	N-27	Leslie T. White	Look Away, Look Away	N (Oct. 1944)	
426	N-28	Jack London	Martin Eden	N (Oct. 1944)	
427	N-29	Stuart Cloete	The Turning Wheels	N (Oct. 1944)	
428	N-30	C. M. Sublette and Harry Harrison Kroll	Perilous Journey	N (Oct. 1944)	
429	N-31	Charles Dickens	David Copperfield	N (Oct. 1944)	
430	N-32	Wallace Stegner	The Big Rock Candy Mountain	N (Oct. 1944)	
431	O-1	Percy Bysshe Shelley	Selected Poems	O (Nov. 1944)	
432	O-2	Kahlil Gibran	The Prophet	O (Nov. 1944)	
433	O-3	John Mulholland	The Art of Illusion	O (Nov. 1944)	
434	O-4	Harry Grayson	They Played the Game	O (Nov. 1944)	
435	O-5	W. H. Hudson	Tales of the Pampas	O (Nov. 1944)	
436	O-6	Edward H. Faulkner	Plowman's Folly	O (Nov. 1944)	
437	O-7	Guy Gilpatric	Mr. Glencannon Ignores the War	O (Nov. 1944)	
438	O-8	Arthur Kober	My Dear Bella	O (Nov. 1944)	
439	O-9	Curt Siodmak	Donovan's Brain	O (Nov. 1944)	
440	O-10	Nelson C. Nye	Wild Horse Shorty	O (Nov. 1944)	
441	O-11	Cornelia Goodhue	Journey into the Fog	O (Nov. 1944)	
442	O-12	C. S. Forester	The African Queen	O (Nov. 1944)	
443	O-13	Anne Terry White	Lost Worlds	O (Nov. 1944)	
444	O-14	Bob Hope	I Never Left Home	O (Nov. 1944)	
445	O-15	Ernest K. Gann	Island in the Sky	O (Nov. 1944)	
446	O-16	Charles L. McNichols	Crazy Weather	O (Nov. 1944)	
447	O-17	W. R. Burnett	Nobody Lives Forever	O (Nov. 1944)	
448	O-18	Damon Runyon	Runyon à la Carte	O (Nov. 1944)	
449	O-19	Charles Jackson	The Lost Weekend	O (Nov. 1944)	
450	O-20	John Russell	Selected Short Stories	O (Nov. 1944)	
451	O-21	Georges Simenon	On the Danger Line	O (Nov. 1944)	
452	O-22	Edgar Rice Burroughs	The Return of Tarzan	O (Nov. 1944)	
453	O-23	Robert Sturgis	Men Like Gods	O (Nov. 1944)	
454	O-24	Joseph Hergesheimer	The Three Black Pennys	O (Nov. 1944)	
455	O-25	Frank H. Spearman	Selwood of Sleepy Cat	O (Nov. 1944)	
456	O-26	Constance Helmericks	We Live in Alaska	O (Nov. 1944)	
457	O-27	Frances Gaither	The Red Cock Crows	O (Nov. 1944)	
458	O-28	M. R. James	Selected Ghost Stories	O (Nov. 1944)	
459	O-29	Ben Ames Williams	Leave Her to Heaven	O (Nov. 1944)	
460	O-30	Zofia Kossak	Blessed Are the Meek	O (Nov. 1944)	
461	O-31	Thomas Wolfe	Look Homeward, Angel	O (Nov. 1944)	
462	O-32	Le Grand Cannon	Look to the Mountain	O (Nov. 1944)	
463	P-1	David Garnett	Lady into Fox	P (Dec. 1944)	
464	P-2	William Chambliss	Boomerang	P (Dec. 1944)	
465	P-3	John R. Tunis	Rookie of the Year	P (Dec. 1944)	
466	P-4	Ludwig Bemelmans	Hotel Splendide	P (Dec. 1944)	
467	P-5	James Norman Hall	Lost Island	P (Dec. 1944)	
468	P-6	Rex Stout	Not Quite Dead Enough	P (Dec. 1944)	
469	P-7	Will Cuppy	The Great Bustard and Other People	P (Dec. 1944)	
470	P-8	Max Brand	The Fighting Four	P (Dec. 1944)	
471	P-9	Hobert D. Skidmore	Valley of the Sky	P (Dec. 1944)	
472	P-10	Benny Goodman and Irving Kolodin	The Kingdom of Swing	P (Dec. 1944)	
473	P-11	H. R. Hays	Lie Down in Darkness	P (Dec. 1944)	
474	P-12	James Oliver Curwood	The Valley of Silent Men	P (Dec. 1944)	
475	P-13	Miriam Young	Mother Wore Tights	P (Dec. 1944)	
476	P-14	Frederick Way Jr.	Pilotin' Comes Natural	P (Dec. 1944)	
477	P-15	Tom Gill	Starlight Pass	P (Dec. 1944)	
478	P-16	Ernest Haycox	Trail Town	P (Dec. 1944)	
479	P-17	Hilda Lawrence	Blood upon the Snow	P (Dec. 1944)	
480	P-18	Arthur Loveridge	Many Happy Days I've Squandered	P (Dec. 1944)	
481	P-19	Erskine Caldwell	Stories by Erskine Caldwell	P (Dec. 1944)	
482	P-20	Captain John D. Craig, ed.	Danger Is My Business	P (Dec. 1944)	
483	P-21	William Hazlett Upson	Botts in War, Botts in Peace	P (Dec. 1944)	
484	P-22	Irvin S. Cobb, ed.	World's Great Humorous Stories	P (Dec. 1944)	
485	P-23	Joseph Shearing	Aunt Beardie	P (Dec. 1944)	
486	P-24	Clyde Brion Davis	Rebellion of Leo McGuire	P (Dec. 1944)	
487	P-25	Herschel Brickell, ed.	O. Henry Memorial Award Prize Short Stories for 1943	P (Dec. 1944)	
488	P-26	E. B. White	One Man's Meat	P (Dec. 1944)	
489	P-27	Anya Seton	Dragonwyck	P (Dec. 1944)	
490	P-28	Mari Sandoz	Slogum House	P (Dec. 1944)	
491	P-29	Charles A. Beard	The Republic	P (Dec. 1944)	
492	P-30	Ernie Pyle	Brave Men	P (Dec. 1944)	
493	P-31	Harlow Shapley, ed.	A Treasury of Science	P (Dec. 1944)	
494	P-32	Catherine Drinker Bowen	Yankee from Olympus	P (Dec. 1944)	
495	Q-1	Cornelia Otis Skinner	Excuse It, Please!	Q (Jan. 1945)	
496	Q-2	James M. Cain	The Postman Always Rings Twice	Q (Jan. 1945)	
497	Q-3	David Ewen	The Story of George Gershwin	Q (Jan. 1945)	
498	Q-4	Hugh Gray and Lillian R. Lieber	The Education of T. C. Mits	Q (Jan. 1945)	
499	Q-5	Max Shulman	The Feather Merchants	Q (Jan. 1945)	
500	Q-6	Mel Heimer	The World Ends at Hoboken	Q (Jan. 1945)	
501	Q-7	Mary Lasswell	High Time	Q (Jan. 1945)	
502	Q-8	John R. Tunis	Keystone Kids	Q (Jan. 1945)	
503	Q-9	Sherwood Anderson	Selected Short Stories of Sherwood Anderson	Q (Jan. 1945)	
504	Q-10	A. A. Fair	Give 'Em the Ax	Q (Jan. 1945)	
505	Q-11	E. E. Halleran	Prairie Guns	Q (Jan. 1945)	
506	Q-12	Theodore Naidish	Watch Out for Willie Carter	Q (Jan. 1945)	
507	Q-13	Thorne Smith	The Passionate Witch	Q (Jan. 1945)	
508	Q-14	Lord Dunsany	Guerilla	Q (Jan. 1945)	
509	Q-15	R. A. J. Walling	The Corpse Without a Clue	Q (Jan. 1945)	
510	Q-16	Ernest Haycox	Man in the Saddle	Q (Jan. 1945)	
511	Q-17	Frances Crane	The Amethyst Spectacles	Q (Jan. 1945)	
512	Q-18	C. S. Forester	Beat to Quarters	Q (Jan. 1945)	
513	Q-19	Zane Grey	The Heritage of the Desert	Q (Jan. 1945)	
514	Q-20	John Hawkins and Ward Hawkins	Devil on His Trail	Q (Jan. 1945)	
515	Q-21	Philip Wylie	Salt Water Daffy	Q (Jan. 1945)	
516	Q-22	Mary Reisner	The House of Cobwebs	Q (Jan. 1945)	
517	Q-23	Donal Hamilton Haines	Luck in All Weathers	Q (Jan. 1945)	
518	Q-24	Max Brand	Happy Jack	Q (Jan. 1945)	
519	Q-25	Mac Gardner	Mom Counted Six	Q (Jan. 1945)	
520	Q-26	Margaret Case Harriman	Take Them Up Tenderly	Q (Jan. 1945)	
521	Q-27	A. J. Cronin	The Green Years	Q (Jan. 1945)	
522	Q-28	Ross McLaury Taylor	The Saddle and the Plow	Q (Jan. 1945)	
523	Q-29	Kenneth Roberts	The Lively Lady	Q (Jan. 1945)	
524	Q-30	Clark McMeekin	Reckon with the River	Q (Jan. 1945)	
525	Q-31	W. Somerset Maugham	The Razor's Edge	Q (Jan. 1945)	
526	Q-32	Lillian Smith	Strange Fruit	Q (Jan. 1945)	
527	Q-33	Anna Seghers	The Seventh Cross	Q (Jan. 1945)	
528	Q-34	Louis Bromfield	Wild Is the River	Q (Jan. 1945)	
529	Q-35	Eugene O'Neill	Selected Plays of Eugene O'Neill	Q (Jan. 1945)	
530	Q-36	John Jennings	The Shadow and the Glory	Q (Jan. 1945)	
531	Q-37	Rachel Field	Time Out of Mind	Q (Jan. 1945)	
532	Q-38	Alexander Laing	The Sea Witch	Q (Jan. 1945)	
533	Q-39	Ben Ames Williams	The Strange Woman	Q (Jan. 1945)	
534	Q-40	Henry Adams	The Education of Henry Adams	Q (Jan. 1945)	
535	R-1	G. B. Stern	The Ugly Dachshund	R (Feb. 1945)	
536	R-2	John Keats	Selected Poems of John Keats	R (Feb. 1945)	
537	R-3	Robert Nathan	One More Spring	R (Feb. 1945)	
538	R-4	Dorothy Parker	Selected Short Stories of Dorothy Parker	R (Feb. 1945)	
539	R-5	Robert Benchley	After 1903—What?	R (Feb. 1945)	
540	R-6	William H. Roberts	Psychology You Can Use	R (Feb. 1945)	
541	R-7	Norman Corwin	Selected Radio Plays of Norman Corwin	R (Feb. 1945)	
542	R-8	Colonel Stoopnagle	You Wouldn't Know Me from Adam	R (Feb. 1945)	
543	R-9	Jacland Marmur	Sea Duty	R (Feb. 1945)	
544	R-10	Samuel Fuller	The Dark Page	R (Feb. 1945)	
545	R-11	Luke Short	War on the Cimarron	R (Feb. 1945)	
546	R-12	Roderick Peattie	Geography in Human Destiny	R (Feb. 1945)	
547	R-13	David Garth	Bermuda Calling	R (Feb. 1945)	
548	R-14	Sir William Cecil Dampier	A Shorter History of Science	R (Feb. 1945)	
549	R-15	George Sanders	Crime on My Hands	R (Feb. 1945)	
550	R-16	D. W. Brogan	The American Character	R (Feb. 1945)	
551	R-17	Emily Kimbrough and Cornelia Otis Skinner	Our Hearts Were Young and Gay	R (Feb. 1945)	
552	R-18	Alan Le May	Winter Range	R (Feb. 1945)	
553	R-19	Edmund Gilligan	The Gaunt Woman	R (Feb. 1945)	
554	R-20	Arthur Henry Gooden	Painted Buttes	R (Feb. 1945)	
555	R-21	Katherine Anne Porter	Selected Short Stories of Katherine Anne Porter	R (Feb. 1945)	
556	R-22	Margery Sharp	Cluny Brown	R (Feb. 1945)	
557	R-23	Deems Taylor	Of Men and Music	R (Feb. 1945)	
558	R-24	Max Brand	The Long Chance	R (Feb. 1945)	
559	R-25	Christopher Morley	Kitty Foyle	R (Feb. 1945)	
560	R-26	David L. Cohn	Combustion on Wheels	R (Feb. 1945)	
561	R-27	Gwethalyn Graham	Earth and High Heaven	R (Feb. 1945)	
562	R-28	Herbert Best	Young 'Un	R (Feb. 1945)	
563	R-29	Clifford Dowdey	Gamble's Hundred	R (Feb. 1945)	
564	R-30	Sigrid Undset	The Bridal Wreath	R (Feb. 1945)	
565	R-31	Bennett Cerf	Try and Stop Me	R (Feb. 1945)	
566	R-32	Rafael Sabatini	Captain Blood	R (Feb. 1945)	
567	R-33	August Derleth, ed.	Sleep No More	R (Feb. 1945)	
568	R-34	Stefan Heym	Of Smiling Peace	R (Feb. 1945)	
569	R-35	Sumner Welles	The Time for Decision	R (Feb. 1945)	
570	R-36	Thomas B. Costain	For My Great Folly	R (Feb. 1945)	
571	R-37	Lloyd C. Douglas	Disputed Passage	R (Feb. 1945)	
572	R-38	W. E. Woodward	The Way Our People Lived	R (Feb. 1945)	
573	R-39	Henrietta Buckmaster	Deep River	R (Feb. 1945)	
574	R-40	Samuel Hopkins Adams	Canal Town	R (Feb. 1945)	
575	S-1	Major William A. Aiken, ed.	A Wartime Whitman	S (Mar. 1945)	
576	S-2	William Saroyan	Dear Baby	S (Mar. 1945)	
577	S-3	Ludwig Bemelmans	I Love You, I Love You, I Love You	S (Mar. 1945)	
578	S-4	James Gould Cozzens	Castaway	S (Mar. 1945)	
579	S-5	James Thurber	My World and Welcome to It	S (Mar. 1945)	
580	S-6	Frank Gruber	Peace Marshal	S (Mar. 1945)	
581	S-7	Richard Sale	Not Too Narrow, Not Too Deep	S (Mar. 1945)	
582	S-8	Philip Wylie	Selected Short Stories of Philip Wylie	S (Mar. 1945)	
583	S-9	Mark Twain	Selected Short Stories of Mark Twain	S (Mar. 1945)	
584	S-10	Dorothy Baker	Young Man with a Horn	S (Mar. 1945)	
585	S-11	Frank Sullivan	A Pearl in Every Oyster	S (Mar. 1945)	
586	S-12	Eric Hatch	Unexpected Uncle	S (Mar. 1945)	
587	S-13	Thomas Beer	The Mauve Decade	S (Mar. 1945)	
588	S-14	Evelyn Eaton	In What Torn Ship	S (Mar. 1945)	
589	S-15	Alexander Laing	Clipper Ship Men	S (Mar. 1945)	
590	S-16	Virginia Perdue	Alarum and Excursion	S (Mar. 1945)	
591	S-17	Donald Hough	Captain Retread	S (Mar. 1945)	
592	S-18	William MacLeod Raine	Guns of the Frontier	S (Mar. 1945)	
593	S-19	Joe E. Brown	Your Kids and Mine	S (Mar. 1945)	
594	S-20	William Irish	After-Dinner Story	S (Mar. 1945)	
595	S-21	Erle Stanley Gardner	The Case of the Black-Eyed Blonde	S (Mar. 1945)	
596	S-22	H. Allen Smith	Lost in the Horse Latitudes	S (Mar. 1945)	
597	S-23	Max Brand	Hunted Riders	S (Mar. 1945)	
598	S-24	Walter Van Tilburg Clark	The Ox-Bow Incident	S (Mar. 1945)	
599	S-25	Fred Lieb	The St. Louis Cardinals	S (Mar. 1945)	
600	S-26	Algernon Blackwood	Selected Short Stories of Algernon Blackwood	S (Mar. 1945)	"Made" book
601	S-27	Donald Culross Peattie	An Almanac for Moderns	S (Mar. 1945)	
602	S-28	Thorne Smith	The Night Life of the Gods	S (Mar. 1945)	
603	S-29	Edgar Snow	People on Our Side	S (Mar. 1945)	
604	S-30	Harlan Hatcher	The Great Lakes	S (Mar. 1945)	
605	S-31	Louis Bromfield	The Farm	S (Mar. 1945)	
606	S-32	Marguerite F. Bayliss	The Bolinvars	S (Mar. 1945)	
607	S-33	Marjorie Kinnan Rawlings	The Yearling	S (Mar. 1945)	Reprint
608	S-34	Merrill Denison	Klondike Mike	S (Mar. 1945)	Reprint
609	S-35	William Makepeace Thackeray	Henry Esmond	S (Mar. 1945)	Abridged
610	S-36	Joseph Stanley Pennell	The History of Rome Hanks	S (Mar. 1945)	Abridged
611	S-37	Francis Hackett	Henry the Eighth	S (Mar. 1945)	Abridged
612	S-38	Kenneth Roberts	Arundel	S (Mar. 1945)	Abridged
613	S-39	Elizabeth Goudge	Green Dolphin Street	S (Mar. 1945)	Abridged
614	S-40	Jean Stafford	Boston Adventure	S (Mar. 1945)	Abridged
615	T-1	Cornelia Otis Skinner	Dithers and Jitters	T (Apr. 1945)	
616	T-2	H. G. Wells	The Time Machine	T (Apr. 1945)	
617	T-3	George Papashvily and Helen Papashvily	Anything Can Happen	T (Apr. 1945)	
618	T-4	David Ewen	Men of Popular Music	T (Apr. 1945)	
619	T-5	John Steinbeck	Cannery Row	T (Apr. 1945)	
620	T-6	Timothy Fuller	This Is Murder, Mr. Jones	T (Apr. 1945)	
621	T-7	Oscar Levant	A Smattering of Ignorance	T (Apr. 1945)	
622	T-8	Louis Untermeyer, ed.	The Fireside Book of Verse	T (Apr. 1945)	"Made" book
623	T-9	Ezra Stone and Weldon Melick	Coming, Major!	T (Apr. 1945)	
624	T-10	Charles Nordhoff and James Norman Hall	Men Against the Sea	T (Apr. 1945)	
625	T-11	Henry Tetlow	We Farm for a Hobby and Make It Pay	T (Apr. 1945)	
626	T-12	Margery Sharp	The Stone of Chastity	T (Apr. 1945)	
627	T-13	Robert Benchley	Benchley Beside Himself	T (Apr. 1945)	Reprint
628	T-14	MacKinlay Kantor	Gentle Annie	T (Apr. 1945)	Reprint
629	T-15	Robert M. Coates	The Outlaw Years	T (Apr. 1945)	
630	T-16	Charles Alden Seltzer	The Range Boss	T (Apr. 1945)	
631	T-17	Patrick Quentin	Puzzle for Puppets	T (Apr. 1945)	
632	T-18	Henry James	Daisy Miller and Other Stories	T (Apr. 1945)	"Made" book
633	T-19	Rosemary Taylor	Ridin' the Rainbow	T (Apr. 1945)	
634	T-20	Eugene Cunningham	Pistol Passport	T (Apr. 1945)	
635	T-21	Max Brand	Riders of the Plain	T (Apr. 1945)	
636	T-22	David Rame	Tunnel from Calais	T (Apr. 1945)	
637	T-23	William Sloane	The Edge of Running Water	T (Apr. 1945)	
638	T-24	Frank Graham	The New York Yankees	T (Apr. 1945)	
639	T-25	Burns Mantle, ed.	The Best Plays of 1943–1944	T (Apr. 1945)	Abridged
640	T-26	Howard Fast	Freedom Road	T (Apr. 1945)	
641	T-27	Ben Lucien Burman	Blow for a Landing	T (Apr. 1945)	
642	T-28	Bennett Foster, Ray Nafziger, C. K. Shaw and Seth Ranger	Wolf Law and Three Other Stories of the West	T (Apr. 1945)	"Made" book
643	T-29	Esther Forbes	The General's Lady	T (Apr. 1945)	
644	T-30	Carl Carmer	Genesee Fever	T (Apr. 1945)	
645	T-31	Walter Karig and Lieutenant Welbourne Kelley	Battle Report	T (Apr. 1945)	
646	T-32	Louis Bromfield	The World We Live In	T (Apr. 1945)	
647	T-33	A. J. Cronin	The Citadel	T (Apr. 1945)	
648	T-34	Maritta Wolff	Whistle Stop	T (Apr. 1945)	
649	T-35	Iola Fuller	Loon Feather	T (Apr. 1945)	
650	T-36	Daphne du Maurier	Rebecca	T (Apr. 1945)	
651	T-37	Marcus Goodrich	Delilah	T (Apr. 1945)	Reprint
652	T-38	Peter Freuchen	Arctic Adventure	T (Apr. 1945)	Reprint
653	T-39	Kathleen Winsor	Forever Amber	T (Apr. 1945)	Abridged
654	T-40	Margaret Landon	Anna and the King of Siam	T (Apr. 1945)	
655	655	Robert Nathan	Portrait of Jennie	U (May 1945)	
656	656	George Lowther	Adventures of Superman	U (May 1945)	
657	657	Max Shulman	Barefoot Boy with Cheek	U (May 1945)	
658	658	Alfred Lord Tennyson	The Charge of the Light Brigade and Other Poems	U (May 1945)	
659	659	Joseph Dunninger	What's on Your Mind?	U (May 1945)	
660	660	Henry Beston	The Outermost House	U (May 1945)	
661	661	Roderick Peattie	Look to the Frontiers	U (May 1945)	
662	662	John P. Sousa III	My Family, Right or Wrong	U (May 1945)	Grandson of John Philip Sousa
663	663	Brett Halliday	Murder and the Married Virgin	U (May 1945)	
664	664	George Sessions Perry and Israel Leighton	Where Away	U (May 1945)	
665	665	J. B. Priestley	The Old Dark House	U (May 1945)	
666	666	Vera Caspary	Laura	U (May 1945)	
667	667	Ernest Hemingway	To Have and Have Not	U (May 1945)	
668	668	Thomas Beer	Mrs. Egg and Other Barbarians	U (May 1945)	
669	669	Guy de Maupassant	Mademoiselle Fifi and Other Stories	U (May 1945)	
670	670	Luke Short	Gunman's Chance	U (May 1945)	
671	671	Thorne Smith	The Glorious Pool	U (May 1945)	
672	672	Jack London	White Fang	U (May 1945)	
673	673	H. Allen Smith	Low Man on a Totem Pole	U (May 1945)	
674	674	William MacLeod Raine	Trail's End	U (May 1945)	
675	675	Dorothy Cameron Disney	The 17th Letter	U (May 1945)	
676	676	Paul Eduard Miller, ed.	Esquire's Jazz Book (1944)	U (May 1945)	
677	677	Walter D. Edmonds	Selected Short Stories	U (May 1945)	
678	678	Zane Grey	Western Union	U (May 1945)	
679	679	C. S. Forester	The Captain from Connecticut	U (May 1945)	
680	680	Ellery Queen	Calamity Town	U (May 1945)	
681	681	Elliott Arnold	Tomorrow Will Sing	U (May 1945)	
682	682	James Stokley	Science Remakes the World	U (May 1945)	
683	683	Ernest Haycox	Bugles in the Afternoon	U (May 1945)	
684	684	John J. O'Neill	Prodigal Genius: The Life and Times of Nikola Tesla	U (May 1945)	
685	685	Alexander Laing	The Cadaver of Gideon Wyck	U (May 1945)	
686	686	William Targ, ed.	Western Story Omnibus	U (May 1945)	
687	687	Isak Dinesen	Seven Gothic Tales	U (May 1945)	
688	688	Ellen Glasgow	Barren Ground	U (May 1945)	
689	689	Edison Marshall	Great Smith	U (May 1945)	
690	690	John Steinbeck	The Grapes of Wrath	U (May 1945)	
691	691	Charles Dickens	Pickwick Papers	U (May 1945)	
692	692	Douglas Rigby and Elizabeth Rigby	Lock, Stock and Barrel	U (May 1945)	
693	693	Irving Stone	Immortal Wife	U (May 1945)	
694	694	Martin Flavin	Journey in the Dark	U (May 1945)	
695	695	Ruth McKenney	The McKenneys Carry On	V (Jun. 1945)	
696	696	E. B. White	Quo Vadimus?	V (Jun. 1945)	
697	697	Arthur Kober	Thunder over the Bronx	V (Jun. 1945)	
698	698	H. G. Wells	The Island of Dr. Moreau	V (Jun. 1945)	
699	699	Sally Benson	Meet Me in St. Louis	V (Jun. 1945)	
700	700	Frederic F. Van de Water	A Home in the Country	V (Jun. 1945)	
701	701	Rose Franken	Another Claudia	V (Jun. 1945)	
702	702	Earl Wilson	I Am Gazing Into My 8-Ball	V (Jun. 1945)	
703	703	John Steinbeck	The Pastures of Heaven	V (Jun. 1945)	
704	704	Henry Wadsworth Longfellow	Paul Revere's Ride and Other Poems	V (Jun. 1945)	
705	705	James Thurber	The Middle-Aged Man on the Flying Trapeze	V (Jun. 1945)	
706	706	Ernest Haycox	Deep West	V (Jun. 1945)	
707	707	Clarence Budington Kelland	Arizona	V (Jun. 1945)	
708	708	Jesse James Benton	Cow by the Tail	V (Jun. 1945)	
709	709	C. S. Forester	To the Indies	V (Jun. 1945)	
710	710	Barry Benefield	Eddie and the Archangel Mike	V (Jun. 1945)	
711	711	Mignon G. Eberhart	Wings of Fear	V (Jun. 1945)	
712	712	William Colt MacDonald	The Three Mesquiteers	V (Jun. 1945)	
713	713	Vardis Fisher	The Golden Rooms	V (Jun. 1945)	
714	714	Albert Payson Terhune	Lad: A Dog	V (Jun. 1945)	
715	715	Max Brand	Gunman's Gold	V (Jun. 1945)	
716	716	Walter Blair	Tell Tale America	V (Jun. 1945)	
717	717		Webster's New Handy Dictionary	V (Jun. 1945)	A 1918 Merriam-Webster edition with a front section of new words, many war-related.
718	718		Webster's New Handy Dictionary	V (Jun. 1945)	Reprint of 717; both were subsequently reprinted multiple times with the same numbers.
719	719	Sgt. George Baker	The Sad Sack	V (Jun. 1945)	
720	720	Edmund Gilligan	Voyage of the Golden Hind	V (Jun. 1945)	
721	721	W. H. Hudson	The Purple Land	V (Jun. 1945)	
722	722	Zane Grey	Sunset Pass	V (Jun. 1945)	
723	723	J. H. Wallis	The Woman in the Window	V (Jun. 1945)	
724	724	Marjorie Kinnan Rawlings	South Moon Under	V (Jun. 1945)	
725	725	Charles Nordhoff and James Norman Hall	Pitcairn's Island	V (Jun. 1945)	
726	726	Frederic Ramsey Jr. and Charles Edward Smith	Jazzmen	V (Jun. 1945)	
727	727	Ngaio Marsh	Death and the Dancing Footman	V (Jun. 1945)	
728	728	Paul Gallico	Farewell to Sport	V (Jun. 1945)	
729	729	William Howells	Mankind So Far	V (Jun. 1945)	
730	730	H. P. Lovecraft	The Dunwich Horror and Other Weird Tales	V (Jun. 1945)	
731	731	Colonel John W. Thomason Jr.	... And a Few Marines	V (Jun. 1945)	
732	732	John Selby	Starbuck	V (Jun. 1945)	
733	733	Albert Maltz	The Cross and the Arrow	V (Jun. 1945)	
734	734	Edward Kasner	Lower Than Angels	V (Jun. 1945)	
735	735	Gerald Johnson	A Little Night Music	W (Jul. 1945)	
736	736	William Wordsworth	My Heart Leaps Up and Other Poems	W (Jul. 1945)	
737	737	Robert Nathan	The Enchanted Voyage	W (Jul. 1945)	
738	738	Gustav Eckstein	Lives	W (Jul. 1945)	
739	739		Soldier Art	W (Jul. 1945)	Distributed to the Army only.
740	740	Sgt. Frank Brandt, ed.	Cartoons for Fighters	W (Jul. 1945)	
741	741	John O'Hara	Pipe Night	W (Jul. 1945)	
742	742	Morton Thompson	Joe, the Wounded Tennis Player	W (Jul. 1945)	
743	743	Vereen Bell	Brag Dog and Other Stories	W (Jul. 1945)	
744	744	Timothy Fuller	Harvard Has a Homicide	W (Jul. 1945)	
745	745	H. G. Wells	The War of the Worlds	W (Jul. 1945)	
746	746	Francis Wallace	Kid Galahad	W (Jul. 1945)	
747	747	Frances Lockridge and Richard Lockridge	Death on the Aisle	W (Jul. 1945)	
748	748	Ernest Haycox	Starlight Rider	W (Jul. 1945)	
749	749	Joseph Wechsberg	Looking for a Bluebird	W (Jul. 1945)	
750	750	John Steinbeck	Cup of Gold	W (Jul. 1945)	
751	751	Raymond Chandler	The Big Sleep	W (Jul. 1945)	
752	752	Arthur Henry Gooden	The Valley of Dry Bones	W (Jul. 1945)	
753	753	Eugene Cunningham	Diamond River Man	W (Jul. 1945)	
754	754	Paul Gallico	Adventures of Hiram Holliday	W (Jul. 1945)	
755	755	James Thurber	Let Your Mind Alone	W (Jul. 1945)	
756	756	E. C. Abbott and Helena Huntington Smith	We Pointed Them North	W (Jul. 1945)	
757	757	Meyer Berger	The Eight Million	W (Jul. 1945)	
758	758	Willard Robertson	Moon Tide	W (Jul. 1945)	
759	759	Clarence E. Mulford	Buck Peters, Ranchman	W (Jul. 1945)	
760	760	Ngaio Marsh	Died in the Wool	W (Jul. 1945)	
761	761	William Hazlett Upson	Keep 'Em Crawling	W (Jul. 1945)	
762	762	Rhoda Truax	Joseph Lister	W (Jul. 1945)	
763	763	Carl Carmer	Listen for a Lonesome Drum	W (Jul. 1945)	
764	764	Frederic Prokosch	The Asiatics	W (Jul. 1945)	
765	765	William McFee, ed.	World's Great Tales of the Sea	W (Jul. 1945)	
766	766	James M. Cain	Double Indemnity and Two Other Short Novels	W (Jul. 1945)	
767	767	Edgar Allan Poe	Selected Stories of Edgar Allan Poe	W (Jul. 1945)	
768	768	Walter D. Edmonds	Young Ames	W (Jul. 1945)	
769	769	Clarence Day	Life with Father and Mother	W (Jul. 1945)	
770	770	Evelyn Eaton	Quietly My Captain Waits	W (Jul. 1945)	
771	771	Lloyd Lewis	Myths after Lincoln	W (Jul. 1945)	
772	772	Virginia Woolf	The Years	W (Jul. 1945)	
773	773	Gene Fowler	Timber Line	W (Jul. 1945)	
774	774	Philip Wylie	Night unto Night	W (Jul. 1945)	
775	775	William March	Some Like Them Short	X (Aug. 1945)	
776	776	Rupert Brooke	Collected Poems of Rupert Brooke	X (Aug. 1945)	
777	777	Gustav Eckstein	Canary	X (Aug. 1945)	
778	778	Hiram Percy Maxim	A Genius in the Family	X (Aug. 1945)	
779	779	Lawrence Edward Watkin	On Borrowed Time	X (Aug. 1945)	
780	780	Bliss Lomax	Horsethief Creek	X (Aug. 1945)	
781	781	Frank Graham	Lou Gehrig	X (Aug. 1945)	
782	782	Ring Lardner	You Know Me, Al	X (Aug. 1945)	
783	783	George Chamberlain	The Phantom Filly	X (Aug. 1945)	
784	784	Charles H. Snow	Sheriff of Yavisa	X (Aug. 1945)	
785	785	Dorothy B. Hughes	The So Blue Marble	X (Aug. 1945)	
786	786	Baynard Kendrick	Blind Man's Bluff	X (Aug. 1945)	
787	787	Howard Fast	Patrick Henry and the Frigate's Keel	X (Aug. 1945)	
788	788	Edward L. McKenna	The Bruiser	X (Aug. 1945)	
789	789	Frances Lockridge and Richard Lockridge	Payoff for the Banker	X (Aug. 1945)	
790	790	Paul B. Sears	This Is Our World	X (Aug. 1945)	
791	791	Ernest Haycox	Trail Smoke	X (Aug. 1945)	
792	792	Glenway Wescott	Apartment in Athens	X (Aug. 1945)	
793	793	Theodore Pratt	The Barefoot Mountain	X (Aug. 1945)	
794	794	John Steinbeck	The Long Valley	X (Aug. 1945)	
795	795	H. Rider Haggard	King Solomon's Mines	X (Aug. 1945)	
796	796	Arthur Train	Mr. Tutt Finds a Way	X (Aug. 1945)	
797	797	Zane Grey	Forlorn River	X (Aug. 1945)	
798	798	Ione Sandberg Shriber	Pattern for Murder	X (Aug. 1945)	
799	799	John O'Hara	Butterfield 8	X (Aug. 1945)	
800	800	Robert Nathan	The Bishop's Wife and Two Other Novels	X (Aug. 1945)	
801	801	Edwin Balmer and Philip Wylie	When Worlds Collide	X (Aug. 1945)	
802	802	Isak Dinesen	Winter's Tales	X (Aug. 1945)	
803	803	Walt Coburn, Bennett Foster, Seth Ranger, Johnston McCulley and Cherry Wilson	Five Western Stories	X (Aug. 1945)	
804	804	C. S. Forester	Commodore Hornblower	X (Aug. 1945)	
805	805	Eric Baume	Yankee Woman	X (Aug. 1945)	
806	806	Carl Carmer	The Hudson	X (Aug. 1945)	
807	807	Monte Barrett	Sun in Their Eyes	X (Aug. 1945)	
808	808	Paul de Kruif	Men Against Death	X (Aug. 1945)	
809	809	Bernard Jaffe	Men of Science in America	X (Aug. 1945)	
810	810	Herbert V. Prochnow, ed.	Great Stories from Great Lives	X (Aug. 1945)	
811	811	Louis Bromfield	Mrs. Parkington	X (Aug. 1945)	
812	812	Rafael Sabatini	The Sea Hawk	X (Aug. 1945)	
813	813	MacKinlay Kantor	Author's Choice	X (Aug. 1945)	
814	814	Thomas B. Costain	Ride with Me	X (Aug. 1945)	
815	815	John Van Druten	The Voice of the Turtle	Y (Sep. 1945)	
816	816	Richard Harding Davis	In the Fog	Y (Sep. 1945)	
817	817	John O'Hara	Pal Joey	Y (Sep. 1945)	
818	818	Joel Sayre	Rackety Rax	Y (Sep. 1945)	
819	819		The New Yorker's Baedeker	Y (Sep. 1945)	
820	820	John Masefield	Selected Poems of John Masefield	Y (Sep. 1945)	
821	821	Richard Shattuck	The Half-Haunted Saloon	Y (Sep. 1945)	
822	822	Bill Mauldin	Up Front	Y (Sep. 1945)	
823	823	Willa Cather	O Pioneers!	Y (Sep. 1945)	
824	824	John Mills	Electronics Today and Tomorrow	Y (Sep. 1945)	
825	825	William Faulkner	A Rose for Emily and Other Stories	Y (Sep. 1945)	
826	826	Margaret Mead	Coming of Age in Samoa	Y (Sep. 1945)	
827	827	Frances Crane	The Indigo Necklace	Y (Sep. 1945)	
828	828	Dorothy B. Hughes	The Delicate Ape	Y (Sep. 1945)	
829	829	C. S. Forester	Payment Deferred	Y (Sep. 1945)	
830	830	Arnold Bennett	Buried Alive	Y (Sep. 1945)	
831	831	Tom Powers	Virgin with Butterflies	Y (Sep. 1945)	
832	832	Thomas L. Stix, ed.	The Sporting Gesture	Y (Sep. 1945)	
833	833	Charles Alden Seltzer	Square Deal Sanderson	Y (Sep. 1945)	
834	834	Clarence E. Mulford	Bar-20 Days	Y (Sep. 1945)	
835	835	Ira Wolfert	American Guerrilla in the Philippines	Y (Sep. 1945)	
836	836	Rose Franken	Claudia and David	Y (Sep. 1945)	
837	837	Ernest Haycox	Sundown Jim	Y (Sep. 1945)	
838	838	Raymond Chandler	The Lady in the Lake	Y (Sep. 1945)	
839	839	Harry Hamilton	River Song	Y (Sep. 1945)	
840	840	James Street	The Biscuit Eater and Other Stories	Y (Sep. 1945)	
841	841	Edison Marshall	The Upstart	Y (Sep. 1945)	
842	842	Zane Grey	Twin Sombreros	Y (Sep. 1945)	
843	843	Margaret Irwin	Young Bess	Y (Sep. 1945)	
844	844	Booth Tarkington	Little Orvie	Y (Sep. 1945)	
845	845	Louis Bromfield	Pleasant Valley	Y (Sep. 1945)	
846	846	Frank Graham	McGraw of the Giants	Y (Sep. 1945)	
847	847	Ralph Temple	Cuckoo Time	Y (Sep. 1945)	
848	848	Whit Burnett, ed.	Time to Be Young	Y (Sep. 1945)	
849	849	Hervey Allen	Bedford Village	Y (Sep. 1945)	
850	850	Joseph Shearing	The Lady and the Arsenic	Y (Sep. 1945)	
851	851	Bram Stoker	Dracula	Y (Sep. 1945)	
852	852	John P. Marquand	Wickford Point	Y (Sep. 1945)	
853	853	Adria Locke Langley	A Lion Is in the Streets	Y (Sep. 1945)	
854	854	Samuel Shellabarger	Captain from Castile	Y (Sep. 1945)	
855	855	Rosemary Benét and Stephen Vincent Benét	A Book of Americans	Z (Oct. 1945)	
856	856	James Thurber	My Life and Hard Times	Z (Oct. 1945)	
857	857	Edna St. Vincent Millay	Lyrics and Sonnets	Z (Oct. 1945)	
858	858	Maude Smith Delavan	The Rumelhearts of Rampler Avenue	Z (Oct. 1945)	
859	859	Conrad Richter	Tacey Cromwell	Z (Oct. 1945)	
860	860	Stefan Zweig	The Royal Game	Z (Oct. 1945)	
861	861	Charles Nordhoff	The Pearl Lagoon	Z (Oct. 1945)	
862	862	F. Scott Fitzgerald	The Great Gatsby	Z (Oct. 1945)	
863	863	Nathaniel Hawthorne	The Gray Champion and Other Tales	Z (Oct. 1945)	
864	864	André Maurois	Ariel: The Life of Shelley	Z (Oct. 1945)	
865	865	Robert Benchley	My Ten Years in a Quandary	Z (Oct. 1945)	
866	866	Erskine Caldwell	Tragic Ground	Z (Oct. 1945)	
867	867	Ernest Haycox	Rim of the Desert	Z (Oct. 1945)	
868	868	Alan Le May	Useless Cowboy	Z (Oct. 1945)	
869	869	Dorothy B. Hughes	The Fallen Sparrow	Z (Oct. 1945)	
870	870	Donald Hough	Snow Above Town	Z (Oct. 1945)	
871	871	John Collier	Green Thoughts and Other Strange Tales	Z (Oct. 1945)	
872	872	S. J. Perelman	Crazy Like a Fox	Z (Oct. 1945)	
873	873	Graham Greene	The Confidential Agent	Z (Oct. 1945)	
874	874	Luke Short	Ramrod	Z (Oct. 1945)	
875	875	Walter D. Edmonds	Mostly Canallers	Z (Oct. 1945)	
876	876	Jack Iams	The Countess to Boot	Z (Oct. 1945)	
877	877	Max Brand	Danger Trail	Z (Oct. 1945)	
878	878	William Irish	Deadline at Dawn	Z (Oct. 1945)	
879	879	John D. Weaver	Wind Before Rain	Z (Oct. 1945)	
880	880	Henry D. Thoreau	Walden	Z (Oct. 1945)	
881	881	H. Rider Haggard	She	Z (Oct. 1945)	
882	882	Ngaio Marsh	Colour Scheme	Z (Oct. 1945)	
883	883	Zane Grey	Desert Gold	Z (Oct. 1945)	
884	884	Harry Leon Wilson	Ruggles of Red Gap	Z (Oct. 1945)	
885	885	Robert Louis Stevenson	The Strange Case of Dr. Jekyll and Mr. Hyde and Other Stories	Z (Oct. 1945)	
886	886	Edmund Gilligan	White Sails Crowding	Z (Oct. 1945)	
887	887	Owen Wister	The Virginian	Z (Oct. 1945)	
888	888	Jesse Stuart	Head o' W-Hollow	Z (Oct. 1945)	
889	889	M. G. Kains	Five Acres and Independence	Z (Oct. 1945)	
890	890	Dorothy L. Sayers	Busman's Honeymoon	Z (Oct. 1945)	
891	891	A. J. Cronin	Hatter's Castle	Z (Oct. 1945)	
892	892	B. A. Botkin, ed.	The Sky's the Limit	Z (Oct. 1945)	
893	893	Frederick Bodmer	The Loom of Language	Z (Oct. 1945)	
894	894	Margaret Leach	Reveille in Washington	Z (Oct. 1945)	
895	895	Juliet Lowell	Dear Sir and Dumb-Belles Letters	AA (Nov. 1945)	
896	896	Jack Goodman and Alan Green	How to Do Practically Anything	AA (Nov. 1945)	
897	897	Jeremiah Digges	Bowleg Bill	AA (Nov. 1945)	
898	898	George Sessions Perry	Walls Rise Up	AA (Nov. 1945)	
899	899	Robert Lawson	Mr. Wilmer	AA (Nov. 1945)	
900	900	D. D. Beauchamp	The Full Life and Other Stories	AA (Nov. 1945)	
901	901	Vachel Lindsay	The Daniel Jazz and Other Poems	AA (Nov. 1945)	
902	902	John Weaver	My Bitter Half and Other Stories	AA (Nov. 1945)	
903	903	Walter Bernstein	Keep Your Head Down	AA (Nov. 1945)	
904	904	Boris Sokoloff, M.D.	The Story of Penicillin	AA (Nov. 1945)	
905	905	James Norman Hall	Lost Island	AA (Nov. 1945)	
906	906	Rex Stout	Not Quite Dead Enough	AA (Nov. 1945)	
907	907	Will Cuppy	The Great Bustard and Other People	AA (Nov. 1945)	
908	908	Max Brand	The Fighting Four	AA (Nov. 1945)	
909	909	Mary Shelley	Frankenstein	AA (Nov. 1945)	
910	910	Robert Fontaine	The Happy Time	AA (Nov. 1945)	
911	911	Sinclair Lewis	Mantrap	AA (Nov. 1945)	
912	912	Richard Connell	Ironies	AA (Nov. 1945)	
913	913	Irving T. Marsh and Edward Ehre, eds.	Best Sports Stories of 1944	AA (Nov. 1945)	
914	914	Craig Rice	The Lucky Stiff	AA (Nov. 1945)	
915	915	Erle Stanley Gardner	The Case of the Golddigger's Purse	AA (Nov. 1945)	
916	916	Ernest Haycox	Canyon Passage	AA (Nov. 1945)	
917	917	Charles Alden Seltzer	The Trail Horde	AA (Nov. 1945)	
918	918	Clarence E. Mulford	Tex	AA (Nov. 1945)	
919	919	William Maxwell Jr.	The Folded Leaf	AA (Nov. 1945)	
920	920	Robert Goffin	Jazz	AA (Nov. 1945)	Nonfiction
921	921	Ben Hecht	Concerning a Woman of Sin and Other Stories	AA (Nov. 1945)	
922	922	Thorne Smith	Rain in the Doorway	AA (Nov. 1945)	
923	923	Joseph Shearing	Aunt Beardie	AA (Nov. 1945)	
924	924	Clyde Brion Davis	Rebellion of Leo McGuire	AA (Nov. 1945)	
925	925	Homer	The Odyssey	AA (Nov. 1945)	Translated by T. E. Shaw
926	926	Aldous Huxley	The Gioconda Smile and Other Stories	AA (Nov. 1945)	
927	927	Elliot Paul	The Last Time I Saw Paris	AA (Nov. 1945)	
928	928	Hugh Walpole	Fortitude	AA (Nov. 1945)	
929	929	George R. Stewart	Names on the Land	AA (Nov. 1945)	
930	930	Leonard Ehrlich	God's Angry Man	AA (Nov. 1945)	
931	931	Samuel Hopkins Adams	A. Woollcott: His Life and His World	AA (Nov. 1945)	
932	932	Hugh MacLennan	Two Solitudes	AA (Nov. 1945)	
933	933		The Bedside Tales	AA (Nov. 1945)	With an introduction by Peter Arno.
934	934		The Best from Yank, the Army Weekly	AA (Nov. 1945)	
935	935	Norman Krasna	Dear Ruth	BB (Dec. 1945)	
936	936	Joe (The Markee) Madden	Set 'Em Up!	BB (Dec. 1945)	
937	937	Rufus King	The Deadly Dove	BB (Dec. 1945)	
938	938	Francis Russell Hart	Admirals of the Caribbean	BB (Dec. 1945)	
939	939	Robert Browning and Elizabeth Barrett Browning	Love Poems	BB (Dec. 1945)	
940	940	Arthur Machen	The Great God Pan and Other Weird Stories	BB (Dec. 1945)	
941	941	Harry Brown	Artie Greengroin, Pfc.	BB (Dec. 1945)	
942	942	Bruce Marshall	The World, the Flesh, and Father Smith	BB (Dec. 1945)	
943	943	Vera Caspary	Bedelia	BB (Dec. 1945)	
944	944	O. Henry	The Ransom of Red Chief and Other Stories	BB (Dec. 1945)	
945	945	Erskine Caldwell	God's Little Acre	BB (Dec. 1945)	
946	946	James Gunn	Deadlier Than the Male	BB (Dec. 1945)	
947	947	E. B. Mann	Comanche Kid	BB (Dec. 1945)	
948	948	Marione Derrickson, ed.	Laugh It Off	BB (Dec. 1945)	
949	949	Charles Alden Seltzer	The Boss of the Lazy Y	BB (Dec. 1945)	
950	950	Frances Lockridge and Richard Lockridge	Killing the Goose	BB (Dec. 1945)	
951	951	E. E. Halleran	Prairie Guns	BB (Dec. 1945)	
952	952	Theodore Naidish	Watch Out for Willie Carter	BB (Dec. 1945)	
953	953	Thorne Smith	The Passionate Witch	BB (Dec. 1945)	
954	954	Lord Dunsany	Guerrilla	BB (Dec. 1945)	Nonfiction
955	955		The New Yorker Profiles	BB (Dec. 1945)	
956	956	William Colt MacDonald	Cartridge Carnival	BB (Dec. 1945)	
957	957	Ronald Kirkbridge	Winds, Blow Gently	BB (Dec. 1945)	
958	958	H. G. Wells	The Food of the Gods	BB (Dec. 1945)	
959	959	Edna Ferber	Great Son	BB (Dec. 1945)	
960	960	Herbert S. Zim	Rockets and Jets	BB (Dec. 1945)	
961	961	Phil Stong	Marta of Muscovy	BB (Dec. 1945)	
962	962	John D. Ratcliff, ed.	Science Yearbook of 1945	BB (Dec. 1945)	
963	963	Frank Graham	The Brooklyn Dodgers	BB (Dec. 1945)	
964	964	Dillon Ripley	Trail of the Money Bird	BB (Dec. 1945)	
965	965	Herb Graffis, ed.	Esquire's First Sports Reader	BB (Dec. 1945)	
966	966	James Hilton	So Well Remembered	BB (Dec. 1945)	
967	967	Jack Gaver and Dave Stanley	There's Laughter in the Air!	BB (Dec. 1945)	
968	968	Lau Shaw	Rickshaw Boy	BB (Dec. 1945)	
969	969	Sinclair Lewis	Cass Timberlane	BB (Dec. 1945)	
970	970	James Thurber	The Thurber Carnival	BB (Dec. 1945)	
971	971	W. Somerset Maugham	The Razor's Edge	BB (Dec. 1945)	
972	972	Lillian Smith	Strange Fruit	BB (Dec. 1945)	
973	973	Stuart Cloete	Against These Three	BB (Dec. 1945)	
974	974	Walter Van Tilburg Clark	The City of Trembling Leaves	BB (Dec. 1945)	
975	975	Herbert Clyde Lewis	Gentleman Overboard	CC (Jan. 1946)	
976	976	Stephen Leacock	My Remarkable Uncle and Other Sketches	CC (Jan. 1946)	
977	977	Paul Corey	Buy an Acre	CC (Jan. 1946)	
978	978	C. B. F. Macauley	The Helicopters Are Coming	CC (Jan. 1946)	
979	979	John O'Hara	The Doctor's Son and Other Stories	CC (Jan. 1946)	
980	980	Robert Trumbull	Silversides	CC (Jan. 1946)	
981	981	Ogden Nash	I'm a Stranger Here Myself	CC (Jan. 1946)	
982	982	Max Brand	Silvertip's Search	CC (Jan. 1946)	
983	983	Oliver Weld Bayer	An Eye for an Eye	CC (Jan. 1946)	
984	984	G. K. Chesterton	The Man Who Was Thursday	CC (Jan. 1946)	
985	985	Archie Robertson	Slow Train to Yesterday	CC (Jan. 1946)	
986	986	Irving Crump	Our United States Secret Service	CC (Jan. 1946)	
987	987	Charles Alden Seltzer	“Beau” Rand	CC (Jan. 1946)	
988	988	Richard Powell	Lay That Pistol Down	CC (Jan. 1946)	
989	989	William MacLeod Raine	Who Wants to Live Forever?	CC (Jan. 1946)	
990	990	Donald Henderson Clarke	Louis Beretti	CC (Jan. 1946)	
991	991	Carter Dickson	The Curse of the Bronze Lamp	CC (Jan. 1946)	Carter Dickson and John Dickson Carr were the same person
992	992	Sewell Peaslee Wright, ed.	Chicago Murders	CC (Jan. 1946)	
993	993	Stanley Frank, ed.	Sports Extra	CC (Jan. 1946)	
994	994	John Erskine	The Private Life of Helen of Troy	CC (Jan. 1946)	
995	995	Frances Crane	The Amethyst Spectacles	CC (Jan. 1946)	
996	996	C. S. Forester	Beat to Quarters	CC (Jan. 1946)	
997	997	Zane Grey	The Heritage of the Desert	CC (Jan. 1946)	
998	998	John Hawkins and Ward Hawkins	Devil on His Trail	CC (Jan. 1946)	
999	999	Ben Lucien Burman	Rooster Crows for Day	CC (Jan. 1946)	
1000	1000	Paul Eduard Miller, ed.	Esquire's 1945 Jazz Book	CC (Jan. 1946)	
1001	1001	Clark McMeekin	Black Moon	CC (Jan. 1946)	
1002	1002	Darrell Huff and Frances Huff	Twenty Careers of Tomorrow	CC (Jan. 1946)	
1003	1003	Edgcumb Pinchon	Dan Sickles	CC (Jan. 1946)	
1004	1004	Bellamy Partridge	January Thaw	CC (Jan. 1946)	
1005	1005	George Bernard Shaw	Arms and the Man and Two Other Plays	CC (Jan. 1946)	
1006	1006	Rafael Sabatini	The Birth of Mischief	CC (Jan. 1946)	
1007	1007	Thomas Bell	All Brides Are Beautiful	CC (Jan. 1946)	
1008	1008	George Russell Harrison	Atoms in Action	CC (Jan. 1946)	
1009	1009	A. J. Cronin	The Green Years	CC (Jan. 1946)	
1010	1010	Ross McLaury Taylor	The Saddle and the Plow	CC (Jan. 1946)	Reprint
1011	1011	Jack London	Best Short Stories of Jack London	CC (Jan. 1946)	
1012	1012	Sophie Tucker	Some of These Days	CC (Jan. 1946)	
1013	1013	Thomas Wolfe	Of Time and the River	CC (Jan. 1946)	
1014	1014	Kenneth Roberts	Northwest Passage	CC (Jan. 1946)	
1015	1015	A. E. Housman	Selected Poems of A. E. Housman	DD (Feb. 1946)	
1016	1016	James Thurber and E. B. White	Is Sex Necessary?	DD (Feb. 1946)	
1017	1017	Fred Russell	I'll Try Anything Twice	DD (Feb. 1946)	
1018	1018	John Paul Andrews	Your Personal Plane	DD (Feb. 1946)	
1019	1019	S. J. Perelman and Q. J. Reynolds	Parlor, Bedlam, and Bath	DD (Feb. 1946)	
1020	1020	Thomas Bell	Till I Come Back to You	DD (Feb. 1946)	
1021	1021	W. C. Tuttle	The Wolf Pack of Lobo Butte	DD (Feb. 1946)	
1022	1022	Bliss Lomax	Rusty Guns	DD (Feb. 1946)	
1023	1023	Virgil Thomson	The State of Music	DD (Feb. 1946)	
1024	1024	Mark Van Doren	Liberal Education	DD (Feb. 1946)	Nonfiction
1025	1025	Clarence Budington Kelland	Dreamland	DD (Feb. 1946)	
1026	1026	Francis Bonnamy	The King Is Dead on Queen Street	DD (Feb. 1946)	
1027	1027	Earl Schenck Miers	Big Ben	DD (Feb. 1946)	
1028	1028	T. S. Stribling	Red Sand	DD (Feb. 1946)	
1029	1029	George Price	Is It Anyone We Know?	DD (Feb. 1946)	
1030	1030	Charles Alden Seltzer	“Drag” Harlan	DD (Feb. 1946)	
1031	1031	Nicholas Blake	The Corpse in the Snowman	DD (Feb. 1946)	
1032	1032	Douglas E. Lurton	Make the Most of Your Life	DD (Feb. 1946)	
1033	1033	Esther Forbes	O Genteel Lady!	DD (Feb. 1946)	
1034	1034	Helen McCloy	Panic	DD (Feb. 1946)	
1035	1035	Alfredo Segre	Mahogany	DD (Feb. 1946)	
1036	1036	Eugene Cunningham	Buckaroo	DD (Feb. 1946)	
1037	1037	Arch Ward	Frank Leahy and the Fighting Irish	DD (Feb. 1946)	
1038	1038	Manning Coles	They Tell No Tales	DD (Feb. 1946)	
1039	1039	Erle Stanley Gardner	The Case of the Half-Wakened Wife	DD (Feb. 1946)	
1040	1040	John Embree	The Japanese Nation	DD (Feb. 1946)	
1041	1041	Charles Jackson	The Lost Weekend	DD (Feb. 1946)	
1042	1042	John Russell	Selected Short Stories of John Russell	DD (Feb. 1946)	
1043	1043	F. Scott Fitzgerald	The Diamond as Big as the Ritz and Other Stories	DD (Feb. 1946)	
1044	1044	Harland Manchester	New World of Machines	DD (Feb. 1946)	
1045	1045	George R. Stewart	Storm	DD (Feb. 1946)	
1046	1046	Gontran de Poncins	Kabloona	DD (Feb. 1946)	
1047	1047	Josephine Pinckey	Three O'Clock Dinner	DD (Feb. 1946)	
1048	1048	Margaret Armstrong	Trelawny	DD (Feb. 1946)	
1049	1049	Alice Tisdale Hobart	Oil for the Lamps of China	DD (Feb. 1946)	
1050	1050	Bennett Cerf, ed.	Modern American Short Stories	DD (Feb. 1946)	
1051	1051	David B. Steinman	The Builders of the Bridge	DD (Feb. 1946)	
1052	1052	George F. Willison	Saints and Strangers	DD (Feb. 1946)	
1053	1053	James Ramsey Ullman	The White Tower	DD (Feb. 1946)	
1054	1054	A. J. Cronin	The Stars Look Down	DD (Feb. 1946)	
1055	1055	Edmund Gilligan	Hunter's Moon and Other Stories	EE (Mar. 1946)	
1056	1056	Robert Herrick	The Love Poems of Robert Herrick	EE (Mar. 1946)	
1057	1057	Cornelia Otis Skinner	Excuse It, Please!	EE (Mar. 1946)	
1058	1058	James M. Cain	The Postman Always Rings Twice	EE (Mar. 1946)	
1059	1059	David Ewen	The Story of George Gershwin	EE (Mar. 1946)	
1060	1060	Hugh Gray and Lillian R. Lieber	The Education of T. C. Mits	EE (Mar. 1946)	
1061	1061	Sally Carrighar	One Day on Beetle Rock	EE (Mar. 1946)	
1062	1062	Nicolas Kalashnikoff	Jumper	EE (Mar. 1946)	
1063	1063	David Dietz	Atomic Energy in the Coming Era	EE (Mar. 1946)	
1064	1064	George S. Brooks	Block That Bride and Other Stories	EE (Mar. 1946)	
1065	1065	James Oliver Curwood	Kazan	EE (Mar. 1946)	
1066	1066		The New Yorker Reporter at Large	EE (Mar. 1946)	
1067	1067	George Sessions Perry	Hold Autumn in Your Hand	EE (Mar. 1946)	
1068	1068	John J. Floherty	Inside the F.B.I.	EE (Mar. 1946)	
1069	1069	Carter Dickson	The Department of Queer Complaints	EE (Mar. 1946)	Carter Dickson and John Dickson Carr were the same person
1070	1070	Dorothy Caruso	Enrico Caruso	EE (Mar. 1946)	
1071	1071	Charles Alden Seltzer	The Vengeance of Jefferson Gawne	EE (Mar. 1946)	
1072	1072	Clarence E. Mulford	The Man from Bar-20	EE (Mar. 1946)	
1073	1073	James B. Hendryx	Gold and Guns on Halfaday Creek	EE (Mar. 1946)	
1074	1074	Craig Rice	The Sunday Pigeon Murders	EE (Mar. 1946)	
1075	1075	Hulbert Footner	The Murder That Had Everything	EE (Mar. 1946)	
1076	1076	R. N. Linscott	Comic Relief	EE (Mar. 1946)	
1077	1077	Louise Dickinson Rich	We Took to the Woods	EE (Mar. 1946)	
1078	1078	Darwin L. Teilhet	My True Love	EE (Mar. 1946)	
1079	1079	Carroll Lane Fenton and Mildred Adams Fenton	The Story of the Great Geologists	EE (Mar. 1946)	
1080	1080	Leo Tolstoy	Tales by Tolstoy	EE (Mar. 1946)	
1081	1081	William G. Campbell and James H. Bedford	You and Your Future Job	EE (Mar. 1946)	
1082	1082	Thomas B. Costain	The Black Rose	EE (Mar. 1946)	
1083	1083		Walt Tulley's Baseball Recorder	FF (Apr. 1946)	
1084	1084	John P. Marquand	Repent in Haste	FF (Apr. 1946)	
1085	1085	Lawrence Lariar, ed.	Best Cartoons of the Year 1945	FF (Apr. 1946)	
1086	1086	J. Storer Clouston	The Lunatic at Large	FF (Apr. 1946)	
1087	1087	George Gamow	Biography of the Earth	FF (Apr. 1946)	
1088	1088	Roy Huggins	The Double Take	FF (Apr. 1946)	
1089	1089	Ladd Haystead	If the Prospect Pleases	FF (Apr. 1946)	
1090	1090	Robert S. Dowst	Straight, Place and Show	FF (Apr. 1946)	
1091	1091	H. G. Wells	The War of the Worlds	FF (Apr. 1946)	
1092	1092	Francis Wallace	Kid Galahad	FF (Apr. 1946)	
1093	1093	Frances Lockridge and Richard Lockridge	Death on the Aisle	FF (Apr. 1946)	
1094	1094	Ernest Haycox	Starlight Rider	FF (Apr. 1946)	
1095	1095	David B. Greenberg and Henry Schindall	A Small Store and Independence	FF (Apr. 1946)	
1096	1096	Ben Lucien Burman	Steamboat Round the Bend	FF (Apr. 1946)	
1097	1097	Baynard Kendrick	Out of Control	FF (Apr. 1946)	
1098	1098	Lawrence Treat	V as in Victim	FF (Apr. 1946)	
1099	1099	Joseph Conrad	Typhoon and The End of the Tether	FF (Apr. 1946)	
1100	1100	Betty MacDonald	The Egg and I	FF (Apr. 1946)	
1101	1101	Charles Alden Seltzer	The Ranchman	FF (Apr. 1946)	
1102	1102	Captain Harry C. Butcher, U.S.N.R.	My Three Years with Eisenhower	FF (Apr. 1946)	
1103	1103	Deems Taylor	The Well-Tempered Listener	FF (Apr. 1946)	
1104	1104	Nancy Bruff	The Manatee	FF (Apr. 1946)	
1105	1105	John F. Wharton	The Theory and Practice of Earning a Living	FF (Apr. 1946)	
1106	1106	Craig Rice	The Big Midget Murders	FF (Apr. 1946)	
1107	1107	Zane Grey	The Border Legion	FF (Apr. 1946)	
1108	1108	Walter Noble Burns	The Saga of Billy the Kid	FF (Apr. 1946)	
1109	1109	Douglass Welch	Mr. Digby	FF (Apr. 1946)	
1110	1110	Richard C. Gill	White Water and Black Magic	FF (Apr. 1946)	
1111	1111	Edna Ferber	Saratoga Trunk	FF (Apr. 1946)	
1112	1112	Orrin E. Dunlap Jr.	Radio's 100 Men of Science	FF (Apr. 1946)	
1113	1113	Konstantin Simonov	Days and Nights	FF (Apr. 1946)	
1114	1114	Stephen Vincent Benét	John Brown's Body	FF (Apr. 1946)	
1115	1115	Christopher Isherwood	Prater Violet	GG (May 1946)	
1116	1116	Sgt. Leonard Sansone	The Wolf	GG (May 1946)	
1117	1117	H. Vernor Dixon	Come In Like a Yankee and Other Stories	GG (May 1946)	
1118	1118	Margery Miller	Joe Louis: American	GG (May 1946)	
1119	1119	Max Shulman	The Zebra Derby	GG (May 1946)	
1120	1120	Henry G. Lamond	Dingo	GG (May 1946)	
1121	1121	James Stephens	The Crock of Gold	GG (May 1946)	
1122	1122	Carl Sandburg	Selected Poems of Carl Sandburg	GG (May 1946)	
1123	1123	Kathleen Moore Knight	Port of Seven Strangers	GG (May 1946)	
1124	1124	Martin Johnson	Safari	GG (May 1946)	
1125	1125	Grace Zaring Stone	The Bitter Tea of General Yen	GG (May 1946)	Ethel Vance and Grace Zaring Stone were the same person
1126	1126	Carl Crow	The Great American Customer	GG (May 1946)	
1127	1127	Barry Benefield	Valiant Is the Word for Carrie	GG (May 1946)	
1128	1128	John P. Carmichael	My Greatest Day in Baseball	GG (May 1946)	
1129	1129	William MacLeod Raine	Courage Stout	GG (May 1946)	
1130	1130	W. Barber and R. Schabelitz	The Noose Is Drawn	GG (May 1946)	
1131	1131	Erle Stanley Gardner	The Case of the Black-Eyed Blonde	GG (May 1946)	
1132	1132	H. Allen Smith	Lost in the Horse Latitudes	GG (May 1946)	
1133	1133	Max Brand	Hunted Riders	GG (May 1946)	
1134	1134	Walter Van Tilburg Clark	The Ox-Bow Incident	GG (May 1946)	
1135	1135	Forbes Parkhill	Troopers West	GG (May 1946)	
1136	1136	George Harmon Coxe	Woman at Bay	GG (May 1946)	
1137	1137	Ed Fitzgerald, ed.	Tales for Males	GG (May 1946)	
1138	1138	Robert Standish	The Small General	GG (May 1946)	
1139	1139	Ivan T. Sanderson	Caribbean Treasure	GG (May 1946)	
1140	1140	Norman V. Carlisle and Frank B. Latham	Miracles Ahead	GG (May 1946)	
1141	1141	Clarence E. Mulford	The Bar-20 Three	GG (May 1946)	
1142	1142	Mark Van Doren	Shakespeare	GG (May 1946)	
1143	1143	Lee R. Steiner	Where Do People Take Their Troubles?	GG (May 1946)	
1144	1144	Marquis James	The Cherokee Ship	GG (May 1946)	
1145	1145	Christina Stead and William Blake, eds.	Modern Women in Love	GG (May 1946)	
1146	1146	Wilbur Daniel Steele	That Girl from Memphis	GG (May 1946)	
1147	1147	John O'Hara	Pal Joey	HH (Jun. 1946)	
1148	1148	Joel Sayre	Rackety Rax	HH (Jun. 1946)	
1149	1149	George Papashvily and Helen Papashvily	Anything Can Happen	HH (Jun. 1946)	
1150	1150	David Ewen	Men of Popular Music	HH (Jun. 1946)	
1151	1151	Ogden Nash	Many Long Years Ago	HH (Jun. 1946)	
1152	1152	Ethel Vance	Winter Meeting	HH (Jun. 1946)	Ethel Vance and Grace Zaring Stone were the same person
1153	1153	M. M. Musselman	Wheels in His Head	HH (Jun. 1946)	
1154	1154	Peter Field	The End Of the Trail	HH (Jun. 1946)	
1155	1155	Margaret Scherf	The Owl in the Cellar	HH (Jun. 1946)	
1156	1156		The Dark Ship and Other Selections from the New Yorker	HH (Jun. 1946)	
1157	1157	Clyde Fisher	The Story of the Moon	HH (Jun. 1946)	
1158	1158	W. H. B. Kent	The Tenderfoot	HH (Jun. 1946)	
1159	1159	Russell Maloney	It's Still Maloney	HH (Jun. 1946)	
1160	1160	Roy Chapman Andrews	Meet Your Ancestors	HH (Jun. 1946)	
1161	1161	W. R. Burnett	Tomorrow's Another Day	HH (Jun. 1946)	
1162	1162	Frances Lockridge and Richard Lockridge	Murder within Murder	HH (Jun. 1946)	
1163	1163	Tom Gill	Starlight Pass	HH (Jun. 1946)	
1164	1164	Ernest Haycox	Trail Town	HH (Jun. 1946)	
1165	1165	Geoffrey Household	The Salvation of Pisco Gabar and Other Stories	HH (Jun. 1946)	
1166	1166	Patricia Wentworth	She Came Back	HH (Jun. 1946)	
1167	1167	Walter S. Landis	Your Servant the Molecule	HH (Jun. 1946)	
1168	1168	Edward Ellsberg	Treasure Below	HH (Jun. 1946)	
1169	1169	William Sloane	The Edge of Running Water	HH (Jun. 1946)	
1170	1170	Frank Graham	The New York Yankees	HH (Jun. 1946)	
1171	1171	Harold Hart, ed.	Top Stuff	HH (Jun. 1946)	
1172	1172	J. Roy Stockton	The Gashouse Gang	HH (Jun. 1946)	
1173	1173	William Irish	I Wouldn't Be in Your Shoes	HH (Jun. 1946)	
1174	1174	Peter W. Rainier	Green Fire	HH (Jun. 1946)	
1175	1175	B. D. Zevin, ed.	Cobb's Cavalcade	HH (Jun. 1946)	
1176	1176	Daphne du Maurier	The King's General	HH (Jun. 1946)	
1177	1177	Erich Maria Remarque	Arch of Triumph	HH (Jun. 1946)	
1178	1178	Jack Goodman, ed.	While You Were Gone	HH (Jun. 1946)	
1179	1179	Ernie Pyle	Last Chapter	II (Jul. 1946)	The II and later series were intended for occupation troops and were smaller.
1180	1180	John McNulty	Third Avenue, New York	II (Jul. 1946)	
1181	1181	Peter Field	Ravaged Range	II (Jul. 1946)	
1182	1182	Gore Vidal	Williwaw	II (Jul. 1946)	
1183	1183	Will Ermine	Outlaw on Horseback	II (Jul. 1946)	
1184	1184	Luke Short	Coroner Creek	II (Jul. 1946)	
1185	1185	Dorothy Macardle	The Unforeseen	II (Jul. 1946)	
1186	1186	Lucy Cores	Let's Kill George	II (Jul. 1946)	
1187	1187	C. S. Forester	Lord Hornblower	II (Jul. 1946)	
1188	1188	Alice Campbell	With Bated Breath	II (Jul. 1946)	
1189	1189	Gene Fowler	A Solo in Tom-Toms	II (Jul. 1946)	
1190	1190	Ben Hibbs, ed.	The Saturday Evening Post Stories, 1942–1945	II (Jul. 1946)	
1191	1191	Lee Casey, ed.	Denver Murders	JJ (Aug. 1946)	
1192	1192	Curtis Bishop	By Way of Wyoming	JJ (Aug. 1946)	
1193	1193	Frank Sullivan	A Rock in Every Snowball	JJ (Aug. 1946)	
1194	1194	Jonathan Stagge	Death's Old Sweet Song	JJ (Aug. 1946)	
1195	1195	Rex Beach	The World in His Arms	JJ (Aug. 1946)	
1196	1196	William MacLeod Raine	Clattering Hoofs	JJ (Aug. 1946)	
1197	1197	Warren Brown	The Chicago Cubs	JJ (Aug. 1946)	
1198	1198	Jim Corbett	Man-Eaters of Kumaon	JJ (Aug. 1946)	
1199	1199	Stanley Vestal	Jim Bridger	JJ (Aug. 1946)	
1200	1200	Ernest K. Gann	Blaze of Noon	JJ (Aug. 1946)	
1201	1201	Robert Penn Warren	All the King's Men	JJ (Aug. 1946)	
1202	1202	Willa Gibbs	Tell Your Sons	JJ (Aug. 1946)	
1203	1203	Thomas Heggen	Mister Roberts	KK (Sep. 1946)	
1204	1204	Arthur Sampson	Football Coach	KK (Sep. 1946)	
1205	1205	Richard Sale	Benefit Performance	KK (Sep. 1946)	
1206	1206	E. E. Halleran	Double Cross Trail	KK (Sep. 1946)	
1207	1207	Earl Wilson	Pikes Peek or Bust	KK (Sep. 1946)	
1208	1208	William Colt MacDonald	Thunderbird Trail	KK (Sep. 1946)	
1209	1209	Vera Caspary	Stranger Than Truth	KK (Sep. 1946)	
1210	1210	George Tabori	Companions of the Left Hand	KK (Sep. 1946)	
1211	1211	Mary O'Hara	Green Grass of Wyoming	KK (Sep. 1946)	
1212	1212	Theodora C. Stanwell-Fletcher	Driftwood Valley	KK (Sep. 1946)	
1213	1213	Wilbur Daniel Steele	The Best Stories of Wilbur Daniel Steele	KK (Sep. 1946)	
1214	1214	Edward Ellsberg	Under the Red Sea Sun	KK (Sep. 1946)	
1215	1215	Kenneth Fearing	The Big Clock	LL (Oct. 1946)	
1216	1216	Max Brand	Mountain Riders	LL (Oct. 1946)	
1217	1217	Pat Frank	Mr. Adam	LL (Oct. 1946)	
1218	1218	Erle Stanley Gardner	The Case of the Borrowed Brunette	LL (Oct. 1946)	
1219	1219	Christopher La Farge	The Sudden Guest	LL (Oct. 1946)	
1220	1220	Peter Freuchen	White Man	LL (Oct. 1946)	
1221	1221	Jonathan Daniels	Frontier on the Potomac	LL (Oct. 1946)	
1222	1222	Rex Stout	The Silent Speaker	LL (Oct. 1946)	
1223	1223	Joseph A. Margolies, ed.	Strange and Fantastic Stories	LL (Oct. 1946)	
1224	1224	Odell Shepard and Willard Shepard	Holdfast Gaines	LL (Oct. 1946)	
1225	1225	John P. Marquand	B.F.'s Daughter	LL (Oct. 1946)	
1226	1226	John Jennings	The Salem Frigate	LL (Oct. 1946)	
1227	1227	Ralph G. Martin	Boy from Nebraska	MM (Nov. 1946)	
1228	1228	David Stern	Francis	MM (Nov. 1946)	
1229	1229	Willis George	Surreptitious Entry	MM (Nov. 1946)	
1230	1230	James B. Hendryx	Courage of the North	MM (Nov. 1946)	
1231	1231	Frances Lockridge and Richard Lockridge	Death of a Tall Man	MM (Nov. 1946)	
1232	1232	John Steinbeck	The Wayward Bus	MM (Nov. 1946)	
1233	1233	MacKinlay Kantor	But Look, the Morn	MM (Nov. 1946)	
1234	1234	Van Wyck Mason	Saigon Singer	MM (Nov. 1946)	
1235	1235	Fred Gipson	Fabulous Empire	MM (Nov. 1946)	
1236	1236	Frank Waters	The Colorado	MM (Nov. 1946)	
1237	1237	Ed Ainsworth (Edward M.)	Eagles Fly West	MM (Nov. 1946)	
1238	1238	Inglis Fletcher	Toil of the Brave	MM (Nov. 1946)	
1239	1239	Les Savage Jr.	Treasure of the Brasada	NN (Dec. 1946)	
1240	1240	Tom West	Six Gun Showdown	NN (Dec. 1946)	
1241	1241	Helen Reilly	The Silver Leopard	NN (Dec. 1946)	
1242	1242	Luther Whiteman	The Face of the Clam	NN (Dec. 1946)	
1243	1243	William Wister Haines	Command Decision	NN (Dec. 1946)	
1244	1244	Arthur Henry Gooden	The Shadowed Trail	NN (Dec. 1946)	
1245	1245	Bergen Evans	The Natural History of Nonsense	NN (Dec. 1946)	
1246	1246	Carter Dickson	My Late Wives	NN (Dec. 1946)	Carter Dickson and John Dickson Carr were the same person
1247	1247	Mildred Walker	The Quarry	NN (Dec. 1946)	
1248	1248	James A. Michener	Tales of the South Pacific	NN (Dec. 1946)	
1249	1249	Holger Cahill	Look South to the Polar Star	NN (Dec. 1946)	
1250	1250	Eric Sevareid	Not So Wild a Dream	NN (Dec. 1946)	
1251	1251	Nelson C. Nye	The Barber of Tubac	OO (Jan. 1947)	
1252	1252	Dana Faralla	The Magnificent Barb	OO (Jan. 1947)	
1253	1253	Fred Feldkamp, ed.	Mixture for Men	OO (Jan. 1947)	
1254	1254	Wayne D. Overholser	Buckaroo's Code	OO (Jan. 1947)	
1255	1255	Pat McGerr	Pick Your Victim	OO (Jan. 1947)	
1256	1256	Michael Blankfort	The Widow-Makers	OO (Jan. 1947)	
1257	1257	Evan Evans	The Border Bandit	OO (Jan. 1947)	
1258	1258	William Gilmore Beymer	The Middle of Midnight	OO (Jan. 1947)	
1259	1259	Clyde Brion Davis	Jeremy Bell	OO (Jan. 1947)	
1260	1260	Fred Lieb	The Detroit Tigers	OO (Jan. 1947)	
1261	1261	Garland Roark	Wake of the Red Witch	OO (Jan. 1947)	
1262	1262	Paul I. Wellman	The Walls of Jericho	OO (Jan. 1947)	
1263	1263	Max Brand	Valley of Vanishing Men	PP (Feb. 1947)	
1264	1264	Peter Field	Gambler's Gold	PP (Feb. 1947)	
1265	1265	Herman Wouk	Aurora Dawn	PP (Feb. 1947)	
1266	1266	Gordon Merrick	The Strumpet Wind	PP (Feb. 1947)	
1267	1267	Ernest Haycox	Long Storm	PP (Feb. 1947)	
1268	1268	Laura Z. Hobson	Gentleman's Agreement	PP (Feb. 1947)	
1269	1269	Ngaio Marsh	Final Curtain	PP (Feb. 1947)	
1270	1270	Hilda Lawrence	Death of a Doll	PP (Feb. 1947)	
1271	1271	Fred Lieb	The Boston Red Sox	PP (Feb. 1947)	
1272	1272	Max Manus	9 Lives Before Thirty	PP (Feb. 1947)	
1273	1273	Elliott Arnold	Blood Brother	PP (Feb. 1947)	
1274	1274	David L. Cohn	This Is the Story	PP (Feb. 1947)	
1275	1275	Curtis Bishop	Shadow Range	QQ (Mar. 1947)	
1276	1276	Anthony Thorne	So Long at the Fair	QQ (Mar. 1947)	
1277	1277	Mark Layton	Silver Spurs	QQ (Mar. 1947)	
1278	1278	Edward A. Herron	Alaska: Land of Tomorrow	QQ (Mar. 1947)	
1279	1279	Manning Coles	With Intent to Deceive	QQ (Mar. 1947)	
1280	1280	John Dickson Carr	The Sleeping Sphinx	QQ (Mar. 1947)	Carter Dickson and John Dickson Carr were the same person
1281	1281	Robert Standish	Mr. On Loong	QQ (Mar. 1947)	
1282	1282	Marguerite Eyssen	Go-Devil	QQ (Mar. 1947)	
1283	1283	Shirley Graham	There Was Once a Slave	QQ (Mar. 1947)	
1284	1284	C. W. Grafton	My Name Is Christopher Nagel	QQ (Mar. 1947)	
1285	1285	John Myers Myers	The Wild Yazoo	QQ (Mar. 1947)	
1286	1286	Evelyn Wells	Jed Blaine's Woman	QQ (Mar. 1947)	
1287 (Note: This book is omitted in the principal source for this table (Manning, 2014), but it is listed in Editions for the Armed Services, Inc.: A History (1948) and the appendix to Cole (1984).)	1287	Harold Rich	Within the Ropes	RR (Apr. 1947)	
1288	1288	Bliss Lomax	Trail Dust	RR (Apr. 1947)	
1289	1289	David Dodge	How Green Was My Father	RR (Apr. 1947)	
1290	1290	Will Ermine	The Drifting Kid	RR (Apr. 1947)	
1291	1291	Patrick Quentin	Puzzle for Pilgrims	RR (Apr. 1947)	
1292	1292	Kelley Roos	Ghost of a Chance	RR (Apr. 1947)	
1293	1293	Richard Lockridge and Frances Lockridge	Think of Death	RR (Apr. 1947)	
1294	1294	Zane Grey	Valley of Wild Horses	RR (Apr. 1947)	
1295	1295	Benedict Freedman and Nancy Freedman	Mrs. Mike	RR (Apr. 1947)	
1296	1296	Annemarie Ewing	Little Gate	RR (Apr. 1947)	
1297	1297	A. B. Guthrie Jr.	The Big Sky	RR (Apr. 1947)	
1298	1298	Raymond T. Bond, ed.	Famous Stories of Code & Cipher	RR (Apr. 1947)	
1299	1299	Allan R. Bosworth	Hang and Rattle	SS (May 1947)	
1300	1300	Peter Field	Trail from Needle Rock	SS (May 1947)	
1301	1301	George Milburn	Flannigan's Folly	SS (May 1947)	
1302	1302	Erle Stanley Gardner	The Case of the Fan-Dancer's Horse	SS (May 1947)	
1303	1303	Francis Rufus Bellamy	Blood Money	SS (May 1947)	
1304	1304	William Colt MacDonald	Master of the Mesa	SS (May 1947)	
1305	1305	Arthur Loveridge	Tomorrow's a Holiday	SS (May 1947)	
1306	1306	John Jennings	Boston: Cradle of Liberty	SS (May 1947)	
1307	1307	Michael Leigh	Comrade Forest	SS (May 1947)	
1308	1308	Robert McLaughlin	The Side of the Angels	SS (May 1947)	
1309	1309	Herbert Krause	The Thresher	SS (May 1947)	
1310	1310	Idwal Jones	Vermilion	SS (May 1947)	
1311	1311	Max Brand	The False Rider	TT (Jun. 1947)	
1312	1312	Kathleen Moore Knight	The Blue Horse of Taxco	TT (Jun. 1947)	
1313	1313	Craig Rice, ed.	Los Angeles Murders	TT (Jun. 1947)	
1314	1314	Elliot Merrick	Passing By	TT (Jun. 1947)	
1315	1315	Richard Phenix	On My Way Home	TT (Jun. 1947)	
1316	1316	Bob Feller	Strikeout Story	TT (Jun. 1947)	
1317	1317	Budd Schulberg	The Harder They Fall	TT (Jun. 1947)	
1318	1318	Charles E. Gillham	Raw North	TT (Jun. 1947)	
1319	1319	Natalie Anderson Scott	The Story of Mrs. Murphy	TT (Jun. 1947)	
1320	1320	Thomas B. Costain	The Moneyman	TT (Jun. 1947)	
1321	1321	Samuel Shellabarger	Prince of Foxes	TT (Jun. 1947)	
1322	1322	Ernie Pyle	Home Country	TT (Jun. 1947)	
