= Clark McMeekin =

American authors (joint pen name)

Clark McMeekin was the joint pseudonym of authors Dorothy (Park) Clark (September 14, 1899 – June 23, 1983) and Isabel (McLennan) McMeekin (November 19, 1895 – September 4, 1973). They are known for a series of popular historical novels set in the state of Kentucky during the 19th century.

== Background on authors ==
Clark was born Dorothy Park in Osceola, Iowa, the daughter of William Park and Eugenia (Dowden) Park. She was educated at Randolph-Macon Women's College and Columbia University. She married Edward Clark in 1923 and they had two daughters. She died in Louisville, Kentucky.

McMeekin was born Isabel McLennan in Louisville to Alexander McLennan and Rosa (Harbison) McLennan. She was educated at Westover School and the University of Chicago. In 1919, she worked at the Pine Mountain Settlement School, an experience that produced later echoes in her novels. In 1921 she married Samuel H. McMeekin, who commanded an American Legion post in Louisville, and they had three children. She died in Louisville.

== Writing career ==
Clark and McMeekin produced an assortment of mysteries, children's books, short stories, and poetry under their own names. McMeekin's 1942 book Journey Cake received an award from the Julia Ellsworth Ford Foundation; the $2,000 prize was the foundation's ninth annual award. They are best known, however, for the dozen historical novels that they co-wrote between 1940 and 1961. Set in 19th century Kentucky, these books cross historical romance with action fiction, and their casts of characters mingle fictional with real historical personages. Several are set during the Civil War.

Old Kentucky Country (1957) was a nonfiction work commissioned by Erskine Caldwell for the American Folkways series.

== Books ==
- Show Me a Land (1940)
- Reckon with the River (1941)
- Welcome Soldier! (1942)
- Red Raskall (1943)
- Show Me a Land (1940)
- Black Moon (1945)
- Gaudy's Ladies (1948)
- City of the Flags (1950)
- Room at the Inn (1953)
- Tyrone of Kentucky (1954)
- The October Fox (1956)
- Old Kentucky Country (1957)
- The Fairbrothers (1961)
