= Edmund Gilligan =

American writer

Edmund Gilligan (1898–1973) was an American author.

Born on June 7, 1898, in Waltham, Massachusetts, he was educated at Harvard University, and served in the United States Navy during the First World War.

Gilligan died on December 29, 1973 (age 75) in Bearsville, New York, US.

Among his novels was The Gaunt Woman, filmed under the title Sealed Cargo in 1951.

== Bibliography ==
- One Lives to Tell the Tale (1931)
- Boundary Against Night (1938)
- White Sails Crowding (1939)
- Strangers in The Vly (1941)
- The Ringed Horizon (1943)
- The Gaunt Woman (1943)
- The Voyage of the Golden Hind (1945)
- I Name Thee Mara (1946)
- Storm at Sable Island (1948)
- Sea Dog (1954)
- Shoe the Wild Mare (1956)
- My Earth, My Sea (1959)
