= Kathleen Moore Knight =

American writer (1890–1984)

- Kathleen Moore Knight, from a 1937 newspaper
- Born: May 19, 1890; Brockton, Massachusetts, U.S.
- Died: July 30, 1984 (age 94); Tisbury, Massachusetts, U.S.
- Other name: Alan Amos (pseudonym)
- Occupation: Writer

Kathleen Moore Knight (May 19, 1890 – July 30, 1984) was an American writer of detective fiction in the 1940s and 1950s. Her novels are often set on Cape Cod and Martha's Vineyard.

== Early life and education ==
Knight was from Brockton, Massachusetts, the daughter of George Knight and Alberta Annie Amos Knight. Her mother died in 1893, and she was raised by her stepmother, Abbie Stevens Knight. Her father was born in Prince Edward Island, and invented manufacturing equipment. She graduated from Brockton High School in 1908, and from Lasell Seminary in 1911.

== Career ==
Knight was a YWCA executive secretary in Waco, Texas, and a publicist in New York City as a young woman. By the mid-1930s, she was a full-time prolific writer of detective fiction, publishing more than thirty novels from 1935 to 1960. "People always ask me how many books I have written and I never seem to be able to give them the latest correct figure," she told a reporter in 1946. Her book Pray for a Miracle (1941) is also considered science fiction, as it deals with a hidden jungle civilization. After World War II, one of her books, Port of Seven Strangers (1945), was distributed to American soldiers. Her Elisha Macomber series has been compared to the Asey Mayo novels of Phoebe Atwood Taylor, as both detective series are usually set in Cape Cod or Martha's Vineyard. The detective in her Margot Blair novels of the 1940s is a physically active, professional woman in her thirties. She was a member of the Mystery Writers of America, and some of her novels were serialized in major newspapers, including The Boston Globe, The Kansas City Star, and The Philadelphia Inquirer.

== Publications ==
=== Elisha Macomber series ===
- Death Blew Out the Match (1935)
- The Clue of the Poor Man's Shilling (1936)
- The Wheel That Turned (1936)
- Seven Were Veiled (1937)
- The Tainted Token (1938)
- Acts of Black Night (1938)
- Death Came Dancing (1940)
- The Trouble at Turkey Hill (1946)
- Footbridge to Death (1947)
- Bait for Murder (1948)
- The Bass Derby Murder (1949)
- Valse Macabre (1952, also known as Death Goes to a Reunion)
- Akin to Murder (1953)
- Three of Diamonds (1953)
- Beauty is a Beast (1959)

=== Margot Blair series ===
- Rendezvous with the Past (1940)
- Exit a Star (1941)
- Terror by Twilight (1942)
- Design in Diamonds (1944)

=== As Alan Amos ===
- Pray for a Miracle (1941)
- Borderline Murder (1947)
- Panic in Paradise (1951)
- Fatal Harvest (1957)

=== Other works ===
- "Silver-Lined" (1912, poem)
- Fan Fare (1932, play, co-written with Julia H. Railey)
- Bell for the Dead (1942)
- Trademark of a Traitor (1943)
- Intrigue for Empire (1944, also sold as Murder for Empire)
- Stream Sinister (1945)
- Port of Seven Strangers (1945)
- The Blue Horse of Taxco (1947)
- Birds of Ill Omen (1948)
- Dying Echo (1949)
- The Silent Partner (1950)
- High Rendezvous (1954)
- The Robineau Look (1955, also sold as The Robineau Murders)
- They're Going to Kill Me (1956)
- A Cry in the Jungle (1958)
- Invitation to Vengeance (1960)
- "Death Came Dancing"
- "Moon Over the Andes"

== Personal life ==
Knight died in 1984, at the age of 94, in Tisbury, Massachusetts.
