= Lost island =

Lost island or Lost islands may refer to:

- Federal Republic of Lostisland, a global sovereign entity and a social and cultural organization
- Lost Island, the title of 2 episodes of Motu Patlu
- Lost Island Theme Park, in Waterloo, Iowa, US
- Lost Island Township, Palo Alto County, Iowa, US
- "Lost Island" refutation, the response by Gaunilo of Marmoutiers to Anselm's logical proof of the existence of God
- Lost Islands (film), a 2008 Israeli film
- The Lost Islands, a 1976 Australian television series
- a lost continent or island, see List of lost lands
- the fictional island of the television series Lost, see Mythology of Lost § The Island
