= Mary Lasswell =

Mary Lasswell Smith (February 8, 1905 – July 19, 1994) was a Scottish-born American writer of humorous novels about life in Southern California, Texas, Mexico, and Newark, New Jersey under the name Mary Lasswell.

== Writing career ==
Her first book, Suds in Your Eye (1942) published by Houghton Mifflin, was described as "a crazy, funny story" about three impoverished but high-spirited and beer-loving elderly women. "The book was unlike most of the novels coming out of Southern California at the time", wrote Beatrice Sherman in The New York Times Book Review on December 13, 1942. This book was adapted into a Broadway Play by Jack Kirkland in 1944.

Suds in Your Eye was followed by five other books about the same three women: Mrs. Feeley, Mrs. Rasmussen, and Miss Tinkham, plus their handyman, only known as "Old-Timer," who never speaks. These included High Time (1944), One on the House (1949), Wait for the Wagon (1951), Tooner Schooner (1953), and Let's Go for Broke (1962), all with illustrations by famed The New Yorker artist George Price. Their home base for most of the series was called "Noah's Ark", and was a junkyard in San Diego, but the third and fourth books were set during travels. In the fifth book they moved away from Noah's Ark to an abandoned mansion eight miles from San Diego. These books consistently featured certain themes: the main characters faced financial disaster, usually were forced to take innovative measures to ensure a homeplace, rescued other people with problems, and acted as matchmakers.

Among Lasswell's other books were Mrs. Rasmussen's Book of One-Arm Cookery (1946), I'll Take Texas (1958), and Tio Pepe (1968). Lasswell was also an editorial writer for the Houston Chronicle in the 1960s.

Lasswell was born in Glasgow, Scotland, of American parents on February 8, 1905, and grew up in Brownsville, Texas. She was married to Dr. Dudley Winn Smith, a surgeon.

She died at the Solvang Lutheran Home in Solvang, California of Alzheimer's disease.

== Book list ==
=== Novels featuring Mrs. Feeley, Mrs. Rasmussen, and Miss Tinkham (illustrated by George Price) ===
- Suds in Your Eye (1942; also adapted as a play)
- High Time (1944)
- One on the House (1949)
- Wait for the Wagon (1951)
- Tooner Schooner (1953)
- Let's Go for Broke (1962)

=== Cookbooks ===
- Mrs. Rasmussen's Book of One-Arm Cookery (1946)
- Mrs. Rasmussen's Book of One-Arm Cookery With Second Helpings (1970; updated edition of previous)

=== Other ===
- Bread for the Living (1948) A serious novel set in Brownsville, Texas, in the early 20th century
- Tio Pepe (1963; illustrated by Robert MacLean)
- I'll Take Texas (1958, with Bob Pool; illustrated by Jo Alys Downs)
- In Way of Progress (1958)
- Rags And Hope: The Recollections Of Val C. Giles, Four Years With Hood's Brigade, Fourth Texas Infantry 1861-1865 (1961)
- John Henry Kirby: Prince of the Pines (1967)
- Mrs. Feeley's Garden of Eden (Modern Maturity Feb-Mar 1979 issue) short story, illustrated by George Price
