= The Face of the Clam =

1947 novel by Luther Whiteman

- First edition
- Author: Luther Whiteman
- Language: English
- Genre: Comic novel California fiction
- Publisher: Random House (1947); South County Historical Society (2010)
- Publication date: 1947
- Publication place: United States
- Media type: Print (Hardback & Paperback)
- Pages: 248
- ISBN: 9780967346496 (2010 paperback)
- OCLC: 6713124

The Face of the Clam is a 1947 novel by author Luther Whiteman. The story is a fictionalized account of the Dunites, a group of bohemians who lived in the Guadalupe-Nipomo Dunes on the Central Coast of California from the 1920s–1940s. Humorously, Whiteman claims in a disclaimer at the front of the book, that the Dunites never existed.

Reprinted as an Armed Services Edition after WWII, the novel was long out of print and considered rare, but the South County Historical Society published a new edition of the book in 2010.

== Publication history ==
Random House published the original edition in 1947. An Armed Services edition (Volume 1242) was published by the U.S. military for soldiers in the Korean War in the same year. The book was out of print and considered rare until the South County Historical Society published a new edition in 2010, with an introduction written by Jane Garrod Whiteman, the author's daughter.

== See also ==
- Tortilla Flat (1935)
