= F. Van Wyck Mason bibliography =

This is complete list of works by American historical novelist F. Van Wyck Mason.

== Bibliography ==
=== Action adventure ===
==== Short stories ====
- The Fetish of Sergeant M’Gourra (1928)
- Previous Rank (1928)
- This Battalion has a Curse on It (1928)
- Do It or Be Court-Martialed (1928)
- Croix de Guerre (1928)
- Brothers in Red (1928)
- Useless (1928)
- Special Delivery (1928)
- The Trail of Mr. Solingen (1928)
- Poisoned Skies (1928)
- The Sword of Vengeance (1928)
- The Doubting Legionnaire Terris (1929)
- Death Is Trumps (1929)
- The Sub and the Merchant Prince (1929)
- Arms and the Girl (1929)
- Polo Par Excellence (1929)
- Sisters of the Sea (1929)
- The Jest of Caid MacGregor (1929)
- Kamerad (1929)
- The Trap-Door of Hell (1929)
- The Word of Adjutant Kent (1929)
- Africa - Uncensored (1929)
- Death's Domain (1929)
- The Stone of Tanit-Astarte (1929)
- The Goldfish Mutiny (1929)
- Spoils of the Sargasso (1929)
- A Gentleman of Coat Armor (1930)
- Mad Anthony’s Legion (1930)
- Reynard's Vengeance (1930)
- The Jester's Duel (1930)
- The Morale Breakers (1930)
- The Scourge of Shaitan (1930)
- Thinkinges' Buck (1930)
- Warriors of Fate (1930)
- A Job for the Tanks (1931)
- Black Orchids (1931)
- Buccaneer Trap (1931)
- Fetish Fighters (1931)
- Ley Fuego (1931)
- Phalanxes of Atlans (1931)
- The Living Juggernaut (1931)
- The Master of Elephants (1931)
- The Red Ships of Death (1931)
- The Tiger of Pnom Kha (1931)
- The Twenty Wicked People (1931)
- The Vanishing Millionaires (1931)
- Always Obey Orders (1932)
- Buffalo Hunter (1932)
- Contraband (1932)
- Desert Vengeance (1932)
- The Girl of Antelope Pass (1932)
- The Jungle Trap (1932)
- The Turquoise Rattler (1932)
- Thirty Seconds Gone (1932)
- Elephant Ju-Ju (1933)
- Emperor's Gold (1933)
- Fangs in the Dark (1933)
- The Fire Bug (1933)
- The Snaring of Sergeant Frost (1933)
- To Be Court-Martialed (1933)
- Voices from the Fog (1933)
- The Steel Legion (1934)
- West Coast Spoils (1934)
- Escape! (1935)
- Lancers, Advance! (1935)
- Mistress Headlong (1935)
- The Enemy's Goal (1935)
- After The Alamo (1936)
- Before the Alamo (1936)
- Black Angel Bridge (1936)
- Hand Drums (1936)
- Special Warden (1936)
- The Broken Wall (1936)
- The Flame Slayer (1936)
- An Enemy at the Dinner Table (1937)
- Gilolo Passage (1937)
- Isles of Doom (1937)
- Old Dog Head (1937)
- Wings over Malekula (1937)
- Midshipman Red Fox (1938)
- Twenty Fathom Terror (1938)
- Valley of the Tigers (1938)
- Pole Star City Case (1939)
- I Start Smoking (1942)
- King of the Lion Hunters (1953)
- The Dawn Hunters (1953)
- Death of a Double Agent (1954)
- Ducks or Death (1954)
- On the Plain of Shahpur (1954)
- Salt-Water Thriller (1957)

==== Novels ====
- Captain Nemesis (1929)
- Captain Judas (1931)
- Captain Renegade (1932)
- Captain Redspurs (1933)
- The Barbarian (1934)
- Captain Long Knife (1934)
- Lysander of Chios (1935)
- All Save One Shall Die (1939)
- Hang My Wreath (1941, as Ward Weaver, rewritten from Captain Redspurs)
- End Of Track (1943, as Ward Weaver, rewritten from Captain Long Knife)
- Wild Drums Beat (1953, rewritten from Captain Renegade)
- The Barbarians (1954, rewritten from The Barbarian)
- Captain Judas (1955, rewritten from 1931 version)
- Lysander (1956, rewritten from Lysander of Chios)
- Captain Nemesis (1957, rewritten from 1929 version)
- Return of the Eagles (1959, rewritten from All Save One Shall Die)

=== Mystery novels ===
- Spider House (1932)
- Murder in the Senate (1935, as Geoffrey Coffin with Helen Brawner)
- The Forgotten Fleet Mystery (1936, as Geoffrey Coffin with A.H. Young O'Brien)
- The Castle Island Case (1937)

=== Hugh North series ===
==== Short stories ====
- "Murder on Swan Island" (1934)
- "The Port of Peril" (1934, aka "The Port of Intrigue")
- "Crime of the Legion" (1934, aka "The Repeater")
- "Explosion" (1935, aka "The Munition Ship Murders")
- "Shanghai Sanctuary" (1935)
- "An Enemy at the Dinner Table" (1937)
- "The Plum Colored Corpse" (1956)

==== Novels ====
- Seeds of Murder (1930)
- The Vesper Service Murders (1931)
- Fort Terror Murders (1931)
- The Yellow Arrow Murders (1932)
- The Branded Spy Murders (1932)
- The Shanghai Bund Murders (1933)
- The Sulu Sea Murders (1933)
- The Budapest Parade Murders (1935)
- The Washington Legation Murders (1935)
- The Cairo Garter Murders (1938)
- The Hongkong Airbase Murders (1937)
- The Singapore Exile Murders (1939)
- The Bucharest Ballerina Murders (1940)
- The Rio Casino Intrigue (1941)
- Saigon Singer (1946)
- Dardanelles Derelict (1949)
- Himalayan Assignment (1952)
- Two Tickets For Tangier (1955)
- The Gracious Lily Affair (1957)
- Secret Mission to Bangkok (1960)
- Colonel Hugh North Solves The Multi-Million-Dollar Murders (1960, rewritten from The Castle Island Case)
- Trouble in Burma (1962)
- Zanzibar Intrigue (1963)
- Maracaibo Mission (1965)
- Deadly Orbit Mission (1968)

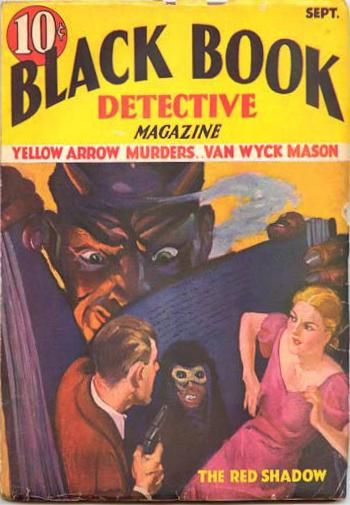
Mason's The Yellow Arrow Murders was the cover story for the September 1933 issue of Black Book Detective

==== Anthologies ====
- The Seven Seas Murders (1936)
- Captain North's Three Biggest Cases (1936)
- Military Intelligence - 8 (1941)
- Oriental Division G-2 (1942)
- The Man from G-2 (1943)

=== Historical fiction ===
==== Novels ====
- Three Harbours (1938)
- Stars on the Sea (1940)
- Rivers of Glory (1942)
- Eagle in the Sky (1948)
- Cutlass Empire (1949)
- Proud New Flags (1951)
- Golden Admiral (1953)
- Blue Hurricane (1954)
- Silver Leopard (1955)
- Our Valiant Few (1956)
- The Young Titan (1959)
- Manila Galleon (1961)
- The Sea 'Venture (1961)
- Rascals' Heaven (1964)
- Wild Horizon (1966)
- Harpoon in Eden (1969)
- Brimstone Club (1971)
- Log Cabin Noble (1973)
- Trumpets Sound No More (1975)
- Guns for Rebellion (1977)
- Armored Giants (1980)

==== Anthologies ====
- Roads to Liberty (1968)

=== Young adult ===
- Q-Boat (1943, as Frank W. Mason)
- Pilots, Man Your Planes (1944, as Frank W. Mason)
- Flight Into Danger (1946, as Frank W. Mason)
- Valley Forge: 24 December 1777 (1950)
- The Winter at Valley Forge (1953)
- The Battle of Lake Erie (1960)
- The Battles for New Orleans (1962)
- The Battle for Quebec (1965)
- The Maryland Colony (1969)

=== Edited by ===
- The Fighting American (1943, editor)
- American Men at Arms (1964, editor)
