= The Biscuit Eater =

The Biscuit Eater is the title of a 1939 short story by James H. Street. It was the basis of two children's films:

- The Biscuit Eater (1940 film)
- The Biscuit Eater (1972 film)
