= Eugene Cunningham =

American author (1896–1957)

Eugene Cunningham (1896–1957) was an American writer of western, mystery, and sea stories.

Eugene Cunningham was born on November 29, 1896, in Helena, Arkansas. However, he was for many years a resident of El Paso, and folks there often assumed he was a native Texan. He moved at some point to California, and died at his home in San Francisco on October 18, 1957, aged 60.

He penned a number of Western novels, including Riders of the Night, Buckaroo, and Diamond River Man. In non-fiction, Triggernometry examined the gunfighters of the Wild West.

== Bibliography ==
=== Novels ===
- The Regulation Guy (1922)
- The Trail To Apacaz (1924)
- Riders of the Night (1932)
- Buckaroo (1933)
- Diamond River Range (1934)
- Texas Sheriff (1934)
- Border Guns (1935)
- Quick Triggers (1935) (aka Quick Trigger)
- Redshirts of Destiny (1935)
- Trail of the Macaw (1935)
- Pistol Passport (1936)
- Whistling Lead (1936)
- The Ranger Way (1937)
- Texas Triggers (1938)
- Gun Bulldogger (1939)
- Red Range (1939)
- The Trail from the River (1939)
- Spiderweb Trail (1940)
- Mesquite Maverick (1955)
- Riding Gun (1956)
- Bravo Trail (1957)

=== Collections ===
- Trails West (2000)

=== Non fiction ===
- Famous in the West (1926)
- Triggernometry: A Gallery of Gunfighters (1934)
- Gene Rhodes (1938)

=== Omnibus editions ===
- Hell-for-Leather (1934)
