= George Sessions Perry =

American novelist, World War II correspondent, and magazine contributor (1910–1956)

George Sessions Perry (May 5, 1910 – December 13, 1956) was an American novelist, World War II correspondent, and one of the highest paid popular magazine contributors of his time. He is remembered best for his 1941 novel Hold Autumn in Your Hand, which won the National Book Award and the Texas Institute of Letters award in 1941. In 1945, French director Jean Renoir directed The Southerner, based on Hold Autumn in Your Hand, starring Zachary Scott and Beulah Bondi. The critical praise and comparisons to John Steinbeck established Perry as one of the top writers of his era.

== Early days ==
Born in Rockdale, Texas, he was the only son of Andrew Perry, a businessman who owned the local drug store, and Laura Perry. After the death of his father in 1922 and the suicide of his mother a year later, George lived with his maternal grandmother Mai Van de Venter, whom he later immortalized in his book My Granny Van, and his Uncle Perry. He spent a year at Southwestern University in nearby Georgetown, the first of three attempts at a college education that included stints at Southwestern, Purdue and the University of Houston, never earning a degree. At Southwestern he met Claire Hodges, daughter of a Beaumont medical doctor.

== Career ==
In 1931, he returned from traveling abroad to marry Claire and move back to Rockdale. Insulated from the worst effects of the Great Depression by a small inherited income, Perry spent the next six years writing six novels and more than 50 short stories about rural and small-town Texas and the semifeudal system of tenant farming that prevailed at the time. Claire Perry acted as his typist, grammarian, and audience. In 1937, The Saturday Evening Post published one of his stories, and soon thereafter Doubleday published his first book, Walls Rise Up, a comic novel about three vagrants living along the Brazos River. In 1941, Perry firmly established his place on the Texas literary scene with Hold Autumn in Your Hand, a novel about a year in the life of a tenant farmer, perhaps the best agrarian novel about Texas. The book won the Texas Institute of Letters "Book of the Year" award in 1941 and became the first Texas book to win the National Book Award. The novel also was named Bookseller Discovery of 1941, voted by members of the American Booksellers Association. According to The New York Times, the Discovery was "a sort of consolation prize that the booksellers hope will draw attention to his work"; 7,000 copies had been sold. (Note: The Discovery was the only National Book Award for 1941 books and the last before the awards were re-established for 1949 books.)

George and Claire Perry acquired a second home in Guilford, Connecticut in the late 1940s. He became one of the most popular writers in the nation in the postwar period as a correspondent for The Saturday Evening Post, particularly with the series "Cities of America" and "Families of America." To the consternation of many of his fans and literary critics, however, he never returned to novels. In declining physical and mental health in his later years, he disappeared on December 13, 1956 after walking into a river near his home there. His body was recovered February 13, 1957 in a small stream, and a coroner's inquest ruled accidental drowning.
