= Natalie Anderson Scott =

American writer (1906–1983)

Natalie Anderson Scott (September 7, 1906 – February 15, 1983), sometimes Natalie B. Sokoloff, was a Russian-born American writer.

Scott was born on September 7, 1906, in Ekaterinoslav (now called Dnipro), Russian Empire, to Nadjeshda (Mochugovskai) and Boris Kamyshansky Sokoloff. She went to school in England before coming to the United States in 1914 or 1915; her family settled permanently in the US in 1922. She began publishing short stories in 1929 and her first novel, So Brief the Years, came out in 1935.

Scott died on February 15, 1983, in Larchmont, New York.

== Books ==
- So Brief the Years (1935)
- The Sisters Livingston (1946)
- The Story of Mrs. Murphy (1947)
- The Husband (1948)
- Romance (1951)
- The Little Stockade (1954)
- Salvation Johnny (1958)
- The Golden Trollop (1961)
