= The Life of Andrew Jackson =

The Life of Andrew Jackson or Life of Andrew Jackson is the title of several notable biographies of American President Andrew Jackson:

- The Life of Andrew Jackson (Reid and Eaton book), by John S. Reid and John Eaton (1817)
- The Life of Andrew Jackson, President of the United States, a parodic biography attributed to Seba Smith (1834)
- Life of Andrew Jackson (Parton book), by James Parton (1860)
- The Life of Andrew Jackson (Bassett book), by John Spencer Bassett (1911)
- The Life of Andrew Jackson (James book), by Marquis James (1938)

== See also ==
- Bibliography of Andrew Jackson
