= Surreptitious Entry =

1946 Willis George memoir

- Author: Willis George
- Language: English
- Genre: Memoir
- Publisher: D. Appleton-Century Co.
- Publication date: 1946
- Publication place: United States
- OCLC: 261121

Surreptitious Entry is a memoir of Willis George's (1897–?) career as a spy, burglar, and safecracker for the United States government. By his own account, he was a "football player, a clerk, a student of patent law, a stock broker, an aviator and an unsuccessful airplane salesman" until beginning his clandestine career in the Treasury Department. With the outbreak of World War II he worked briefly with Canadian intelligence services before transferring to the Office of Naval Intelligence and then the Office of Strategic Services.

== Summary ==
In an extended excerpt published in the St. Louis Post-Dispatch, Willis George details how a team of eleven agents broke into the Chicago office of "Stephen K. Ziggly," a suspected Nazi spy. The process began with the two members responsible for security posing a workmen painting the hallway outside of Ziggly's office in order to familiarize themselves with who worked in that office. After two days of this, George and a locksmith picked the lock of the office after hours and mapped out the interior. The team then created an elaborate cover story about an engineering company that would be in the building overnight checking for "building sway," requiring the elevators to be shut down and the amount of foot traffic to be kept to a minimum.

On the night of the surreptitious entry, the two members responsible for security stayed in the truck to watch for Ziggly or his associates showing up unexpectedly. If any were spotted, they would radio the news to the rest of the team. The rest of the team entered the office using a key fabricated by the locksmith. The team included a safecracker, a "flaps and seals" expert, a photographer, a multi-lingual "evaluator," two additional "security" men, a radio operator, and George as the "agent-in-charge."

Fifteen minutes after the entry the team is interrupted: one of Ziggly's employees has returned to the office to fetch a bottle of whiskey from his desk. The security team delays him in the lobby, berating him for interrupting such important sway-test engineering work and giving the rest of the team time to leave the office and cover their tracks. After the whiskey is retrieved, the surreptitious entry begins again.

A supposedly impregnable safe is opened by manipulation in under 20 minutes. A code book is retrieved and exhaustively photographed. The evaluator selects other documents worth recording, the flaps-and-seals expert ensures everything is returned exactly as it was found. In less than four hours over 2000 photograph were taken. Two days later Ziggly is led away for questioning.

== Reviews ==
Reviews were positive. An anonymous reviewer for The Age compared George's style favorably to E. Phillips Oppenheim, except that George's book was "more consistently exciting and considerably richer in variety.". Frederick Yeiser's review in The Cincinnati Enquirer rated the book "a good yarn ... simply told ... in the unadorned manner of police reporting." George H. Straley, writing for The Philadelphia Inquirer, called the book "absorbing," "a valuable documentary contributing to war annals," and a "thrilling narrative.". The Brooklyn Daily Eagle's Alfred Duckett found the book "simple enough to entertain," and a syndicated review credited to both "Joe Wing" and "W. G. Rogers" leads with "Anyone who thrills to secret agent stories should get a bang out of this one."

== The Author ==
Willis George claimed authorship of Picks, Clips, Locks and Seals, ostensibly authored by "George Gardner." While several reviewers mentioned George's comments about the difficulty of finding work given his particular wartime experience, by 1950 he was employed by the lock and safe manufacturer Sargent & Greenleaf.
