= John Edward Jennings =

American novelist

- Jennings in April 1941
- Born: December 30, 1906; Brooklyn, New York, U.S.
- Died: December 4, 1973 (aged 66); Miller Place, New York, U.S.
- Education: Colorado School of Mines, Columbia University
- Occupation: Writer
- Known for: Historical novels

John Edward Jennings Jr. (December 30, 1906 – December 4, 1973) was an American historical novelist. He wrote many best-selling novels of American history and seagoing adventure. He also wrote several nonfiction books on history.

== Biography ==
Jennings was born in Brooklyn, New York, attended the Colorado School of Mines, and studied engineering and literature at Columbia University. He had his first experience of seafaring at age 19 as a hand aboard a tramp steamer in the Black Sea and eastern Mediterranean. As of October 1940, aged 33, he was living in Wayland, Massachusetts, and was self-employed. In World War II, he served as a lieutenant in the US Navy and was head of the Naval Aviation History Unit.

Jennings first wrote short stories and travel narratives. His first novel, Next to Valour, set during the French and Indian War, was published in 1939. It became a best-seller, translated into seven languages. His most popular novel was The Salem Frigate, a romantic adventure set on the US frigate Essex. Other seafaring adventures included The Sea Eagles, about the early days of the US Navy, and Chronicle of the Calypso, Clipper about a clipper race. Banners Against the Wind (1954) was a biographical novel about the pioneering doctor Samuel Gridley Howe.

Jennings died in December 1973 at his home in Miller Place, New York. He was survived by his wife and a son.

== Selected bibliography ==
Novels

- Next to Valour (1939)
- Call the New World (1941)
- Gentleman Ranker (1942)
- The Shadow and the Glory (1943)
- The Salem Frigate (1946)
- River to the West: A Novel of the Astor Adventure (1948)
- The Sea Eagles (1950)
- The Pepper Tree (1950)
- Banners Against the Wind (1954)
- Shadows in the Dark (1955)
- Chronicle of the Calypso, Clipper (1955)
- The Wind in His Fists (1956)
- The Raider (1963), about World War I naval warfare

Nonfiction

- Our American Tropics (1938)
- Boston, Cradle of Liberty, 1630-1776 (1947)
- Clipper Ship Days: The Golden Age of American Sailing Ships (1952)
- The Golden Eagle (1959)
- Tattered Ensign (1966), about the launching of the USS Constitution, and the early US Navy

== Sources ==
- The Encyclopedia of American Literature of the Sea and Great Lakes (2000), Greenwood Publishing Group, p. 213
- Twentieth Century Authors: A Biographical Dictionary of Modern Literature (1942), by Stanley Kunitz and Howard Haycraft, H.W. Wilson Company
