= Archie Binns =

American writer (1899–1971)

- Born: July 30, 1899; Port Ludlow, Washington, U.S.
- Died: June 28, 1971 (aged 71)
- Education: Stanford University
- Occupation: Writer
- Spouse(s): Mollie (died 1954); Ellen Binns (died 2008)
- Children: 6

Archie Binns (July 30, 1899 – June 28, 1971) was an American writer.

Archie Binns was born in Port Ludlow, Washington and attended high school in Shelton, Washington. He graduated from Stanford University in 1921. Though strongly influenced by his Pacific Northwest upbringing, Binns moved to New York City in the 1920s. While at Charles Scribner's Sons publishing house his editor was Maxwell Perkins. Binns returned to Seattle in the 1940s. He taught creative writing at the University of Washington, at Western Washington State College and Skagit Valley College.

Binns' first wife Mollie died in 1954. He retired to Sequim, Washington, in 1964, where he continued to write until his death from a stroke. His second wife, Ellen Binns, survived him and died in 2008. Binns is survived by six children and many grandchildren.

== Novels ==
- The Maiden Voyage (1931)
- Lightship (1934) (Appeared on CBS Radio Workshop)
- Backwater Voyage (1936)
- The Laurels Are Cut Down (1937)
- The Land is Bright (1939)
- Mighty Mountain (1940)
- Timber Beast (1944)
- You Rolling River (1947)
- The Headwaters (1957)

== Histories and Biographies ==
- Northwest Gateway (1941)
- The Roaring Land (1942)
- Sea in the Forest (1953)
- Mrs Fiske and the American Theatre (1955)
- Peter Skene Ogden: Fur Trader (1967)

== Juvenile Literature ==
- The Radio Imp (1950)
- Secret of Sleeping River (1952)
- Sea Pup (1954)
- The Enchanted Islands (1956)
- Here, Buster! (1962)
- Sea Pup Again (1965)

== Sources ==
- Archie Binns at the Internet Speculative Fiction Database
