= A Portrait of Murder =

1955 television episode

- The 20th Century Fox Hour episode
- Episode no.: Season 1 Episode 2
- Directed by: John Brahm
- Written by: Mel Dinelli
- Based on: Laura; 1943 novel by Vera Caspary
- Cinematography by: Lloyd Ahern Sr.
- Editing by: Robert Simpson
- Original air date: October 19, 1955

Guest appearances
- George Sanders; Dana Wynter; Robert Stack

"A Portrait of Murder" is a 1955 episode of the TV series The 20th Century-Fox Hour. It was a remake of Laura.

It was adapted by Mel Dinelli, produced by Otto Lang and directed by John Brahm.

Stack was assigned to star as he was under contract to Fox. He said Brahm "who had not asked for the idiotic assignment, got so tangled up in the cameras and the seven day schedule it took us fourteen days to shoot it."

When The 20th Century-Fox Hour was syndicated to local stations as Hour of Stars, the title of this episode reverted to the original film and novel title, Laura.

Sanders and Stack reprised their roles in a 1968 TV film version which Stack called "an even worse version of the poor defenseless film".

== Cast ==
- George Sanders as Waldo Lydecker
- Dana Wynter as Laura Hunt
- Robert Stack as Mark McPherson
- Scott Forbes as Shelby Carpenter
- Johnny Washbrook as Danny Morgan
- Gloria Clark as Bessie Clary
- Gordon Wynn as MacAvity
- Robert B. Williams as Fred Callahan
- Harry Carter as Policeman
