= Out of the Blue (1947 film) =

1947 film by Leigh Jason

- Directed by: Leigh Jason
- Screenplay by: Vera Caspary; Walter Bullock; Edward Eliscu
- Story by: Vera Caspary
- Produced by: Isadore Goldsmith; Bryan Foy
- Starring: George Brent; Virginia Mayo; Turhan Bey; Ann Dvorak; Carole Landis
- Cinematography: Jackson Rose
- Edited by: Norman Colbert
- Music by: Carmen Dragon
- Color process: Black and white
- Production company: Bryan Foy Productions
- Distributed by: Eagle-Lion Films
- Release date: April 21, 1947
- Running time: 84 minutes
- Country: United States
- Language: English
- Budget: $1.1 million

Out of the Blue is a 1947 American screwball comedy independent film based on the short story by Vera Caspary, whose work was adapted for Laura and adapted A Letter to Three Wives, also co-wrote this screenplay. It stars George Brent, Virginia Mayo, Turhan Bey, Ann Dvorak and Carole Landis. It was directed by Leigh Jason.

== Plot ==
Arthur Earthleigh (George Brent) lives in an apartment in Greenwich Village, where he is dominated by his wife Mae (Carole Landis) and annoyed by Rabelais, the German Shepherd owned by his neighbour, artist and swinging bachelor David (Turhan Bey). David has a constant parade of attractive women visiting his apartment to pose for him. He currently is being visited by Deborah (Virginia Mayo) who wants David's champion Rabelais to breed with her dog.

When his wife goes off to visit her sister, Arthur visits a bar where he's picked up by interior decorator Olive (Ann Dvorak) who comes home with him. Olive has a taste for brandy that she insists alleviates her heart condition but makes her tipsy. Arthur orders the reluctant Olive to leave, but Olive enters the guest room unbeknownst to Arthur. Waking up the next day Arthur discovers Olive has not only spent the night but redecorated the room. In attempting to get her to leave he knocks Olive down to the floor where he thinks she has died.

Olive's 'body' is then moved about by David, who uses Arthur's fear of having killed Olive to blackmail him into changing his mind about getting a court order to compel David to get rid of his dog. Meanwhile, a serial killer is stalking the Village with two elderly snoopers (Elizabeth Patterson and Julia Dean) believing Olive is his victim. Adding to Arthur's troubles is his wife returning.

== Cast ==
- George Brent as Arthur Earthleigh
- Virginia Mayo as Deborah Tyler
- Turhan Bey as David Gelleo
- Ann Dvorak as Olive Jensen
- Carole Landis as Mae Earthleigh
- Elizabeth Patterson as Miss Spring
- Julia Dean as Miss Ritchie
- Richard Lane as Detective Noonan
- Charles Smith as Elevator Boy (as Charlie Smith)
- Paul Harvey as Holliston
- Alton E. Horton as Detective Dombry
- Hadda Brooks as Singer
- Flame as Rabelais

== Production ==
The previous year mystery writer Vera Caspary wrote, in England, the screenplay of Bedelia, from her 1945 novel, which was produced by her future husband Isadore Goldsmith. Her original short story for Out of the Blue appeared in Today's Woman magazine in September 1947. She had a percentage deal with Eagle-Lion Films.

Hadda Brooks sings the title song in a nightclub.

Out Of The Blue was the last film Carole Landis made in Hollywood.

== Release ==
On 26 November 2019, ClassicFlix released Out of the Blue on a single Blu-ray disc, in MPEG-4 Advanced Video Coding with Mono DTS-HD Master Audio 2.0.

== Reception ==
"Brent, who seldom gets a chance to show how accomplished he really is in light comedy easily holds up his end, but it is Miss Dvorak who wows as the screwball interior decorator. Dvorak reveals an entirely new side to a public that, if it hasn’t exactly forgotten her, never remembers her in this sort of thing. Had the others fitted as neatly into their roles, outcome might have been quite different, but it is very hard to accept Bey without a turban, while Virginia Mayo registers only when she simulates a tough babe." - Variety (magazine)

"the direction isn't swiftly paced enough for effective farce, and some of the actors obviously aren’t comfortable in the genre...one must be in an open or forgiving mood to get the most out of this uneven comic effort" - Matt Hough, Home Theater Forum, November 2019

"a curious film, not quite making the grade as a screwball item yet catching a good if spotty reaction through the incongruity of George Brent, Ann Dvorak, and Turhan Bey working as comedians" - Laurence Dabin, Toronto Film Society, November 2020
