= Stranger Than Truth =

1946 mystery novel by Vera Caspary

- Author: Vera Caspary
- Language: English
- Genre: Mystery
- Publisher: Random House
- Publication date: 1946
- Publication place: United States
- Media type: Print

Stranger Than Truth is a 1946 mystery novel by the American writer Vera Caspary. The character of publisher Noble Barnes was inspired by that of Bernarr Macfadden and his Macfadden Publications. Caspary had briefly worked on one of Macfadden's magazines in the 1920s, and had encountered Macfadden's daughter Eleanor who she used as the basis of a character of the same name in her novel. It uses multiple points of view as several different characters narrate the story in the first person. Unlike her previous two works, Laura and Bedelia, it was not adapted into a film.

== Synopsis ==
John Ansell, the newly-appointed young editor of a true crime magazine wants to run a story about an unsolved murder, but finds the article is quashed by those above him. When he tries to pursue the story, he is warned off by both the magazine's owner Noble Barclay and his henchman Munn. Shortly afterwards an attempt is made on Ansell's life. He survives but his concerns grow that Eleanor, Barclay's daughter, may be mixed up in the original murder.

== Publication History ==
Following its initial 1946 publication in hardcover by Random House, a separate hardcover edition with a new dust jacket was published by The Thriller Book Club in 1947. That same year, it was published in the UK by Eyre & Spottiswoode. A paperback edition was published by the Readers Choice Library in 1950.

Stranger Than Truth was also serialized over five issues of Collier's. An abridged version was printed in Detective Book Magazine in early 1948.

== Bibliography ==
- Emrys, A.B. Wilkie Collins, Vera Caspary and the Evolution of the Casebook Novel. McFarland, 2014.
- Wald, Alan M. American Night: The Literary Left in the Era of the Cold War. UNC Press Books, 2012.
