= Fallen Angel (1945 film) =

1945 film by Otto Preminger

- Theatrical release poster
- Directed by: Otto Preminger
- Screenplay by: Harry Kleiner
- Based on: Fallen Angel by Marty Holland
- Produced by: Otto Preminger
- Starring: Alice Faye; Dana Andrews; Linda Darnell
- Cinematography: Joseph LaShelle
- Edited by: Harry Reynolds
- Music by: David Raksin
- Color process: Black and white
- Production company: 20th Century Fox
- Distributed by: 20th Century Fox
- Release date: December 14, 1945
- Running time: 97 minutes
- Country: United States
- Language: English
- Budget: $1,075,000
- Box office: $1.5 million

Fallen Angel is a 1945 American film noir directed by Otto Preminger and produced by 20th Century Fox, with cinematography by Joseph LaShelle, who had also worked with Preminger on Laura a year before. Adapted from Marty Holland's novel, the film was shot in various California locations and features Alice Faye, Dana Andrews, and Linda Darnell in leading roles.

Andrews was cast under pressure despite initial objections to the script. Faye returned from a hiatus to accept the role but withdrew from the industry for sixteen years, until State Fair (1962), after her part was substantially cut during editing. Darnell, cast as the femme fatale, was praised for her performance, marking the beginning of several collaborations with Preminger, despite reported tensions on set. Fallen Angel was released to positive reviews from critics.

== Plot ==
Eric Stanton, a well-dressed but down-on-his-luck drifter, feigns sleep but gets pulled off a bus in the hamlet of Walton because he does not have the fare to continue to San Francisco. He finds a low-budget diner called "Pop's Eats", where Pop is worried about waitress Stella because she has not shown up for work for days. Ex-New York cop Mark Judd tells him not to worry, and the sultry Stella soon returns. Stanton is attracted to her, but she is unimpressed by his smooth talk.

Stanton cons his way into a job with Professor Madley, a traveling fortune teller and spiritualist. He goes to the large house of Clara Mills, daughter of the late mayor, Abraham Mills.

The townspeople are unwilling to buy tickets to Madley's "spook meeting" because Clara Mills, an influential local spinster, disapproves. Stanton gets to Clara through her inexperienced younger sister June and persuades them to attend the performance.

Madley stages an entertaining séance, channeling Abraham Mills, the deceased father of Clara and June. Using information secretly dug up by his assistant Joe Ellis, Madley brings up the sisters' financial problems. The two become upset and leave.

Stanton gets to know Stella, watching her steal from the cash register and go out with men, and falls in love with her. She makes it clear that she wants a man who is willing to marry her and buy her a home, which he agrees to do. To raise the money, Stanton romances and marries June, planning to divorce her as soon as he can. Clara, who has been victimized by a man of Stanton's type in her past, is unable to prevent their marriage.

Stanton cannot stay away from Stella, even on his wedding night. Instead of sleeping with his wife, he goes to Stella, who has given up on him. He explains his odd scheme to her. She rejects him and he leaves watched by Clara who has followed him. He gets home late and is found by June sleeping on the couch.

The next day Stella is found to be murdered. Judd is asked by the local police chief to investigate. He first tries to beat a confession out of Dave Atkins, Stella's latest boyfriend, but Atkins has an airtight alibi. Stanton is also a strong suspect, having been seen quarreling with Stella shortly before her death. Judd tells him not to leave town.

Stanton flees, with June, to a seedy hotel room in San Francisco. He tells her all about his drifter's life of failed schemes. June tells Stanton that she loves him; the next morning, when she goes to the bank to withdraw her money, she is taken into custody for questioning.

Stanton returns to Pop's Eats, where Judd is waiting for him. Stanton has found evidence of Judd’s relationship with Stella and how he left NY police because of his violence. Stella had decided to marry Atkins rather than wait for Judd's wife to give him a divorce.

Judd pulls out his gun but Pop wrestles it away. Stanton prevents him from shooting Judd, though a shot is fired into the ceiling. This brings a police officer in, and Judd is arrested. Outside, June pulls up in a car and asks Stanton where they are going; he tells her, "Home."

== Cast ==
- Alice Faye as June Mills
- Dana Andrews as Eric Stanton
- Linda Darnell as Stella
- Charles Bickford as Mark Judd
- Anne Revere as Clara Mills
- Bruce Cabot as Dave Atkins
- John Carradine as Professor Madley
- Percy Kilbride as Pop
- Olin Howland as Joe Ellis

== Background ==
=== Source material ===
The source of the film was the Marty Holland novel of the same title. Holland also wrote another story that was adapted for the film noir screen, The File on Thelma Jordon (1949). According to the British Film Institute, "Hardly anything is known about Marty Holland except that ‘he’ was a she called Mary, who wrote two or three best-selling pulp novels and then in 1949—to all intents and purposes—vanished, there being no further record of her at all."

Holland faded into obscurity after her last published writing credit in 1952 until the 70th anniversary of crime drama imprint Série noire. "Contradicting the consensus theory that Holland changed her name from Mary to Marty to hide her gender and come off as 'more masculine,' her photo is on the back cover of first editions of Fallen Angel, and all reviews and news of the time referred to her as 'Miss Holland' or 'Miss Marty Holland.' Perhaps Marty, that gender-neutral name, sounded more hardboiled than did Mary." Holland lived in Los Angeles until her death from cancer in 1971.

=== Production ===
The film's location shots were in Orange, California, San Francisco, the Ocean Park Bowling Center in Ocean Park, California, the California Bank in Hollywood, and the Sycamore Pier in Malibu.

=== Casting ===
Because of his success in Otto Preminger’s Laura, Dana Andrews was asked to play the part of Eric by Darryl Zanuck and Preminger. Initially, Andrews was hesitant due to misgivings over the script. After Preminger asked him to explain his initial disinclination, he argued, “In the first place, I don’t think it’s a picture for Alice Faye, but beside [sic] that, I don’t like the part of me. I don’t like the picture, it’s terrible. It’s in bad taste, it’s unbelievable. I just can’t see it at all.” He only reluctantly accepted the role after being threatened with suspension by Zanuck.

For the role of June Mills, several actresses were considered, including Jeanne Crain, Olivia de Havilland, and Anne Baxter. Alice Faye, who had been one of 20th Century Fox’s most notable musical comedy stars, had been on a career hiatus due to a lack of mature roles being offered to her. “I was tired of being a Technicolor blonde in musicals that didn’t even pretend to have a plot,” she stated later. After rejecting many scripts, she was pleasantly surprised when she received one for Fallen Angel. "I was mad after I read [the script] — because I liked it so much,” she stated in 1945, “So I called up the studio and said, 'I'm coming back to work.' Everyone practically fainted." She agreed to play the role of June on a few conditions, one being that she star with Dana Andrews, and another being that she got to choose and sing the theme song. She decided on “Slowly” written by David Raksin, which she was “simply wild about." After these conditions were met, she was excited to begin work on the picture. Yet, she was incredibly nervous and “temperamental” on set, so much so that Preminger had to shut down production at one point. After she finished her portion of the movie, she attended a screening of the final cut of the film. To her surprise, her recording of “Slowly” was cut, along with a good portion of her scenes. She was infuriated. “I was terribly upset. I felt the film had been ruined." Zanuck had edited the film to bring out Linda Darnell’s character, minimizing Faye’s role as the female lead and her first attempt at a strictly dramatic role. On her way out of the studio, she wrote an angry letter to Zanuck, left it on his desk, abandoned her new contract, and didn’t return to the industry for sixteen years.

In January 1945, the role of Stella was given to Linda Darnell, who at this point was one of 20th Century Fox’s top actresses and achieved newfound success as a femme fatale. According to biographer Ronald L. Davis, Linda approached the character “with gusto,” and that “everyone agreed it was her finest acting yet." This film was also her first time working with director Otto Preminger, whom she would work with four more times throughout her career. She did not enjoy working with Preminger, and this was a common sentiment throughout the cast and crew. Preminger himself stated that she had “a rather colorless personality." However, Linda was remembered fondly by other members of the film. David Raksin, the film’s composer, said, “There was something lusty about her without any overt attempt to seduce. I realized she was there not because she was a schooled actress, but because she was beautiful.” Dana Andrews deemed her “the best thing in the picture." Linda herself was pleased with the role among the other ones she had been working on at the time, calling them "interesting."

== Reception ==
=== Critical response ===
On Rotten Tomatoes, 85% of 13 reviews are positive.

New York Times film critic Bosley Crowther liked the acting in the film but was disappointed by the story. He wrote, "As the frustrated adventurer, Dana Andrews adds another excellent tight-lipped portrait of a growing gallery. Linda Darnell is beautiful and perfectly cast as the sultry and single-minded siren, while Miss Faye, whose lines often border on the banal, shoulders her first straight, dramatic burden, gracefully. Charles Bickford, as a dishonorably discharged cop, Anne Revere, as Miss Faye's spinster sister, and Percy Kilbride, as the lovesick proprietor of the diner in which Miss Darnell works, are outstanding among the supporting players. But for all of its acting wealth, Fallen Angel falls short of being a top-flight whodunit."

Critic Tim Knight of Reel.com notes that if the viewers can forget the "... headlong dive into preposterousness, it's still a lot of fun". His review adds, "... the movie does have much to recommend, from Joseph La Shelle's atmospheric, black-and-white cinematography to Preminger's taut direction to the juicy, hard-boiled dialogue. Veteran character actors Charles Bickford, John Carradine, and Percy Kilbride (of Ma and Pa Kettle fame) lend strong support to the sizzling twosome of Andrews and Darnell, who made only one more film together, when they were both past their prime: 1957's Zero Hour!, a forgotten grade-Z thriller."

Critic Fernando F. Croce wrote of the film, "Fallen Angel, the director's follow-up to his 1944 classic, is often predictably looked down on as a lesser genre venture, yet its subtle analysis of shadowy tropes proves both a continuation and a deepening of Preminger's use of moral ambiguity as a tool of human insight...Preminger's refusal to draw easy conclusions—his pragmatic curiosity for people—is reflected in his remarkable visual fluidity, the surveying camera constantly moving, shifting dueling points-of-view in order to give them equal weight. Fallen Angel may not satisfy genre fans who like their noir with fewer gray zones, but the director's take on obsession remains no less fascinating for trading suspense for multilayered lucidity."

== See also ==
- List of American films of 1945
