= Bedelia (film) =

1946 British film by Lance Comfort

- Directed by: Lance Comfort
- Written by: Vera Caspary; Herbert Victor; Isadore Goldsmith
- Based on: Bedelia by Vera Caspary
- Produced by: Isadore Goldsmith
- Starring: Margaret Lockwood; Ian Hunter; Barry K. Barnes; Anne Crawford
- Cinematography: Freddie Young
- Edited by: Michael Truman
- Music by: Hans May
- Production company: John Corfield Productions
- Distributed by: Eagle-Lion Films (US); General Film Distributors (UK); J. Arthur Rank Film (Germany)
- Release dates: May 1946 (UK); 7 February 1947 (US)
- Running time: 90 minutes
- Country: United Kingdom
- Language: English
- Box office: $350,000 (US)

Bedelia (also known as Vera Caspary's Bedelia) is a 1946 British melodrama film directed by Lance Comfort and starring Margaret Lockwood, Ian Hunter and Barry K. Barnes. It was written by Vera Caspary, Herbert Victor and Isadore Goldsmith, adapted from Caspary's 1945 novel Bedelia, with events relocated from the United States to Monaco and England.

== Plot ==
Bedelia is newly married and on her honeymoon in Monte Carlo with her husband, Charlie Carrington, in the autumn of 1938. She has a strong aversion to being photographed by her husband, claiming she is not photogenic. Spotting her in a sidewalk cafe, young painter Ben Chaney starts drawing a sketch of her; seeing this, she abruptly turns her head away. He encounters her husband and has a drink with the couple. When the husband notices a pearl ring, she claims it is a cheap piece of fake jewellery, though Ben knows otherwise. He was speaking to a jewellery store proprietor when she picked up the ring; the expert offered her 100,000 francs for the flawless black pearl. Ben begins probing into her past. In reality a detective, he suspects that Bedelia's obsession with money has led her to dispose of more than one husband for the insurance money.

Back in their mansion in England, Ben is invited to begin a portrait.

Carrington becomes ill. Dr McAfee, his physician, confines him to bed and, at Ben's urging, appoints a private nurse, Nurse Harris. Bedelia is told to sleep in a separate room and the nurse oversees everything Charlie eats and drinks. However Carrington's business partner, Ellen, has seen Ben passing money to the nurse, making her suspicious of what is going on. She says she is going to tell Charlie, but Ben makes her think again, as, over tea, he mentions that a friend from Edinburgh - a sea captain named Captain McKelvey - will be visiting soon, and Bedelia's reaction makes Ellen realize that there may be more going on than she thinks.

Bedelia is desperate to be rid of the nurse, and a three-way argument begins over control of the household, the nurse, the housekeeper and Bedelia, and the nurse is dismissed. She goes to tell Ben what has happened. Bedelia arranges for the housekeeper to have an extra day off and go and stay overnight with her cousin, leaving her and Charlie alone in the house. She then tries to persuade Charlie to leave and go abroad, but he says he cannot just leave the business at short notice, and what would they live on if he did? She also tells him that Ben wants to harm her, and that he should not listen to anything he says. When he refuses to leave at short notice, Bedelia runs off in a snowstorm, but she crashes the car, and he brings her back. She tells Charlie that she is scared of losing him, but feels that she is not good enough for him.

Ben comes to check on Charlie, who demands to know what he has done to Bedelia to make her so afraid of him. Ben reluctantly tells Charlie several background stories concerning Bedelia. These stories, shown as vignettes within the overall story, include a chemist in Edinburgh called McKelvey and a murdered husband, a tale in France where a wife killed her husband, and a Mr. Jacobs in Manchester, also killed. Ben reveals himself as an investigator. He thinks Bedelia is a serial killer, motivated by large insurance policies. Charlie is furious at Ben, who leaves him, knowing that at least he has warned his friend as much as he can. Overnight, Charlie has much to think about, but in the morning, after a confrontation with his wife, she brings him round again, and he seems likely to forgive her.

The housekeeper returns, bringing with her their groceries, which a neighbour helped her fetch, as the buses are not running because of the snow. She also brings Ben's groceries. Through the kitchen window, Charlie sees Bedelia doing something with the groceries, but she says she is just feeding the cat, Topaz, whom she dotes on. Charlie laughingly says Ben will not be able to eat his favourite smoked salmon now, and, to her horror, Bedelia sees that Topaz is eating the salmon from Ben's grocery bag. Her hysterical response, and finding a bottle of poison in her hand, finally makes Charlie realise that Ben was telling the truth. She runs to her room, and Charlie soon follows her. He says that she should start packing, and she is excited - until he tells her he isn't going with her, but that she is not going away alone. He tells her he knows she was trying to kill Ben, so Bedelia tries another tack; she first says she wants to give Charlie all her money, but he is disgusted at the thought of where the money came from. She then says she is very ill, and needs his help, and Charlie agrees that she is incurable and leaves the room. Bedelia then asks Mary the housekeeper to ask Ellen to lunch, so that Charlie will not have to eat alone, as she will not be there. When Mary has left, she looks down at the bottle of poison in her hand.

== Cast ==
- Margaret Lockwood as Bedelia Carrington
- Ian Hunter as Charlie Carrington
- Barry K. Barnes as Ben Chaney
- Anne Crawford as Ellen
- Beatrice Varley as Mary, Carrington's housekeeper
- Louise Hampton as Hannah
- Jill Esmond as Nurse Harris
- Julien Mitchell as Dr. McAfee
- Vi Stevens as Mrs. McAfee
- Kynaston Reeves as Mr. Bennett
- Olga Lindo as Mrs. Bennett
- John Salew as Alec Johnstone
- Barbara Blair as Sylvia Johnstone
- Daphne Arthur as Miss Jenkins
- Claude Bailey as Capt. McKelvey
- Ellen Pollock as McKelvey's housekeeper
- Henry De Bray as M. Martin
- Marcel Poncin as M. Perrin
- Michael Martin Harvey as Abbé
- Sonia Sergyl as Abbé's housekeeper
- Aubrey Mallalieu as vicar
- Oscar Nation as Police Inspector

== Production ==
=== Original novel ===
The film was based on the 1945 novel by Vera Caspary, about a bachelor in his thirties called Charlie who married a widow, Bedelia, he meets at a summer resort in 1913. The New York Times said it was "guaranteed to raise gooseflesh on the hottest summer night." The Los Angeles Times called it "one of the neatest and cleverest jobs of writing this season."

=== Development ===
The film version of Caspary's novel Laura had been a big hit in 1944 and there was much interest in Bedelia even before publication. Caspary enjoyed the film of Laura although had some reservations. "Hollywood simply can't visualise a girl who leads her own life, and in whom sex is not uppermost", said Caspary. "They always show the career woman as either frustrated or freakish. I know lots of balanced professional women who can take love or let it alone." "They [the filmmakers] did very well by me, I think", said Caspary later. She went on to sign a ten-year contract with Eagle Lion, calling for one story a year.

This meant she was susceptible to approaches from British film companies as well as Hollywood. She also felt in Britain there was more respect for the writer. In late 1944 she sold the film rights to producer Isadore Goldsmith, who had impressed Caspary with The Stars Look Down, and wanted to set up the film in England. Goldsmith arranged financing through John Cornfield Productions, a unit of the Rank Organisation.

Caspary travelled to London to do an early draft of the script, which transplanted the action from Connecticut to Yorkshire.

"The movie will probably have one or two Hollywood names in it and will be an Arthur Rank release", said the Los Angeles Times. "Mr Rank is another who was wonderful to me – but then in England even the producers respect writers... England is counting on pictures to be one of her great export items."

Early contenders for the title role included Geraldine Fitzgerald, Vivien Leigh and Merle Oberon. Later on Marlene Dietrich, Valerie Hobson and Linden Travers were mentioned. Donald Woods, then appearing in a stage version of Laura, was a front-runner for the male lead.

Eventually Margaret Lockwood was cast in the lead, with Ian Hunter and Barry Barnes in support. It was Barnes' first film since The Girl in the News, also with Lockwood, and Hunter's first British film in 14 years. Jill Esmond, Laurence Olivier's first wife, was given a support role. The film was made with the American market very much in mind.

=== Shooting ===
Filming began December 1945. Filming was relatively elaborate by the standards of British filmmaking of the time. Production ended in April 1946.

Goldsmith later optioned the film rights to Caspary's next novel, Out of the Blue.

=== Alternative endings ===
Prior to filming, Goldsmith submitted the script to the Johnston office in the US (the censor). They had issues with the proposed ending, where Bedelia committed suicide with the tacit encouragement of her husband. It was decided to shoot an additional ending for the American market where Bedelia turned herself in to the police. This sequence cost $63,000. Lockwood thought it was "ridiculous" to have to shoot a new ending. Most British observers who saw the two endings preferred the suicide one.

When Goldsmith showed the final film to the US censor, they said he could use the British ending if he wanted. Goldsmith showed the film to various Hollywood observers and press and found they preferred the American ending. According to The New York Times, Goldsmith thought the difference of opinion between British and American observers went to "the relative position of women on the two sides of the Atlantic. Americans, he believes, prefer to see their heroines in the most favourable light, even at the sacrifice of integrity in character study."

In addition to this, some scenes had to be reshot for the US to reduce the extent of Lockwood's visible cleavage.

== Radio adaptation ==
Bedelia was presented on Hollywood Star Time 26 October 1946. Herbert Marshall and Gene Tierney starred in the adaptation.

== Reception ==
=== Box office ===
According to trade papers, the film was a "notable box office attraction" at British cinemas.

Lockwood wrote in her memoirs that although the film "was a great success, in truth had not done much to mollify my opinion of scripts in general."

The movie was the first released in America by Rank under its new agreement with Eagle-Lion Films, which Rank part owned. Rank hoped it would be a success, but it only grossed $350,000.

=== Critical ===
The Monthly Film Bulletin wrote: "Here is a film which falls between two stools. It tones down the drama of harsh violence and tense expectancy so that the film is structurally bad as a crime or mystery thriller. But it fails to accept fully the alternative necessity of building in the fullest possible character and motivation. Director Comfort has failed to evoke from his players sufficient subtlety or depth to remedy this basic script deficiency. His work is smooth enough, however, and he has one or two nice conceits with his camera – for instance, the first shot of Bedelia through ribbed glass. The players supporting Miss Lockwood are conscientious and competent, but the material is not there to make great roles."

Kine Weekly wrote: "Elegantly mounted, but pedestrian romantic thriller, adapted from a bestseller by Vera Caspary. It follows the trail of a modern Lucrezia Borgia, and ends, true to tradition, with the wellborn maxim, 'crime does not pay,' but keeps no tricks up its sleeve. Margaret Lockwood fails completely to offset the lack of subtlety and finesse. In spite of her impressive portrayal and elaborate settings, interest frequently flags and the climax is incredibly tame."

TV Guide noted, "Margaret Lockwood appears in one of her best villainous roles, played this time with subtlety."

Leonard Maltin called the film "absorbing but not terribly suspenseful".

The New York Times described it as "pretty much of a disappointment".
