= Laura (1968 film) =

1968 American TV film

- Based on: Laura by Vera Caspary
- Screenplay by: Truman Capote; Thomas Phipps
- Directed by: John Llewellyn Moxey; David Susskind
- Starring: Eithne Dunne; Arlene Francis; Farley Granger
- Music by: Robert Prince; David Raksin
- Countries of origin: United States; United Kingdom
- Original language: English

Production
- Producer: David Susskind
- Editor: Alfred Muller
- Running time: 120 minutes
- Production company: American Broadcasting Company

Original release
- Network: ABC
- Release: January 24, 1968

Laura is a 1968 American TV film, a remake of the 1944 film of the same name. It was directed by John Llewellyn Moxey and written by Truman Capote and Thomas Phipps. David Susskind produced.

The film had previously been adapted for television in 1955 as A Portrait of Murder.

== Cast ==
- George Sanders as Waldo Lydecker
- Robert Stack as Mark McPherson
- Arlene Francis as Mrs. Ann Treadwell
- Farley Granger as Shelby Carpenter
- Lee Radziwill (billed as "Lee Bouvier") as Laura Hunt

== Production ==
Truman Capote was friends with Lee Radziwill who wanted to act and had made her stage debut in a revival of The Philadelphia Story. He met up with David Susskind and told him, "Lee Radiziwill is going to be an actress and I think we should all put something together for her. I'm sure that she'll be so good I'll write it for her myself."

Susskind thought Radziwill "wasn't very good" in her stage performance "but I thought maybe I saw a glimmer of something in her performance. The television companies had noticed the publicity, so it looked like we could set something up."

Capote wrote an adaptation of The Voice of the Turtle for her but Susskind worried it would be too difficult. So he suggested they do Laura.

Michael Dyne reportedly rewrote Capote's script.

The show was taped in London in October 1967. Robert Stack and George Sanders reprised roles they had performed on TV in the 1955 version. Stack recalled in his memoirs that "the production resembled a junior high school effort."

== Reception ==
Critical reception to Radziwill's performance was hostile. The Chicago Tribune called it the "worst drama" of the season in which Radziwill was "unbelievably bad". Another review in The Washington Post said it was "disappointing all round." The New York Times called it "so laboured and so dull that the occasion was just a laboured walk through."
