= My Dog Shep =

1946 film

- Directed by: Ford Beebe
- Written by: Ford Beebe
- Produced by: William B. David associate Barney A. Sarecky
- Starring: Tom Neal; William Farnum
- Cinematography: Fred Mandl
- Edited by: Gregg C. Tallas
- Music by: Russell Garcia; James Mayfield
- Production company: Golden Gate Pictures
- Distributed by: Screen Guild Productions (US); Exclusive (UK)
- Release date: December 1, 1946 (United States)
- Running time: 69 minutes
- Country: United States
- Language: English

My Dog Shep is a 1946 American drama film directed by Ford Beebe.

It was made by Golden Gate Productions and released through the newly-formed Screen Guild Productions. They had just made Flight to Nowhere.

Filming started August 15, 1946. Greg McClure was meant to be in the cast. Lanny Rees was borrowed from RKO.

== Plot ==
Danny, an orphan, tries to find a home along with his dog, Shep. He goes to live with a mean Uncle Matt but loving Aunt Carrie. Cousin Arthur squeals on him that he secretly has been keeping a German Shepherd that he named Shep. Danny runs away with his dog.

Elderly Carter lives with his son who overhears his daughter-in-law bitterly complaining about him. Carter tells his son he will move to the Soldier's Home and leaves that same day. Along the road Danny and Carter cross paths and join up. Both were not wanted where they lived and they bond.

Uncle Matt was happy Danny was gone until an attorney arrives and tells him Danny is to inherit $100,000. He now offers a $500 reward to find Danny Barker and his dog, Shep. Carter sees the reward in the paper and Danny tells him he does not want to return to his uncle's farm. While Carter is in town for supplies, he sends a telegram to the estate attorney. The Sheriff now has a way to find the boy.

While Danny is swimming, he is discovered by tomboy Lorna. Her Dad is the District Attorney and she is kidnapped to affect a gangster's indictment. Danny is kidnapped as well but Shep tracks them down. Carter saw the kidnappers and the Sheriff is following him to get the boy so all together they are successful rescuing Lorna.

All the parties are in the judge's chambers to discuss Danny's adoption. Uncle Matt now wants the boy for his money and his mean character is exposed. Carter explains he was not aiding a runaway. He did not seek the reward. He and Danny and his dog found comfort with one another. The Judge decides the DA family would be best for Danny. As they leave the Court, Shep goes up to Carter to pull him back with Danny and he is welcomed into the new family as well.

== Cast ==
- Flame as German Shepherd "Shep"
- Lanny Rees as Orphan Danny Barker
- William Farnum as Father Carter J. Latham
- Russell Simpson as Uncle Matt Hodgkins
- Sarah Padden as Aunt Carrie Hodgkins
- Freddie Chapman as Cousin Arthur Hodgkins
- Craig Reynolds as W. D. Stanfield, Attorney
- Paul E. Burns as Sheriff
- Al St. John as Deputy Sheriff
- Tom Neal as District Attorney Jim Herrick
- Janet Chapman as Tomboy Lorna Herrick
- Helen Chapman as Mrs. Lois Herrick
- Douglas Evans as Dutch Riley, Kidnapper
- Reed Howes as Shorty Spain, Kidnapper
- Harry Holman as The Judge
- Grady Sutton as Son John H. Latham
- Si Jenks as Western Union Clerk
- Ralph Littlefield as Crane, a Farmer
- Jess Kirkpatrick as Broadcaster

== Reception ==
The film was popular. Flame, the dog who starred in the film, went on to star in Out of the Blue, the Rusty series of movies (starting with For the Love of Rusty), and the My Pal series of shorts.

He was also in the sequel, Shep Comes Home (1948).
