= His Butler's Sister =

1943 film

- Theatrical release poster
- Directed by: Frank Borzage
- Screenplay by: Samuel Hoffenstein; Elizabeth Reinhardt
- Produced by: Felix Jackson
- Starring: Deanna Durbin
- Cinematography: Elwood Bredell
- Edited by: Ted J. Kent
- Music by: Hans J. Salter
- Production company: Universal Pictures
- Distributed by: Universal Pictures
- Release date: November 26, 1943
- Running time: 87 minutes
- Country: United States
- Language: English
- Box office: $1.7 million (US rentals) or $1,750,000

His Butler's Sister is a 1943 American romantic comedy film directed by Frank Borzage and starring Deanna Durbin. The supporting cast includes Franchot Tone, Pat O'Brien, Akim Tamiroff, Evelyn Ankers and Hans Conried. The film was nominated for an Oscar for Best Sound Recording (Bernard B. Brown).

== Plot ==
Ann Carter visits New York City to see her half-brother Martin Murphy and to try to start a music career. Martin works as a butler for Broadway producer Charles Gerard, so Ann takes a job working for Charles as a maid.

== Cast ==
- Deanna Durbin as Ann Carter
- Franchot Tone as Charles Gerard
- Pat O'Brien as Martin Murphy
- Akim Tamiroff as Popoff
- Alan Mowbray as Buzz Jenkins
- Walter Catlett as Mortimer Kalb
- Elsa Janssen as Severina
- Evelyn Ankers as Elizabeth Campbell
- Frank Jenks as Emmett
- Sig Arno as Moreno
- Hans Conried as Reeves
- Florence Bates as Lady Sloughberry
- Roscoe Karns as Fields
- Russell Hicks as Sanderson
- Andrew Tombes as Brophy
- Stephanie Bachelor as Dot Stanley
- Marion Pierce as Margaret Howard
- Iris Adrian as Sunshine Twin
- Robin Raymond as Sunshine Twin

== Production ==
The film was announced in January 1943. In April, Frank Borzage signed to direct and Pat O'Brien to star. In May, Franchot Tone signed to play the male lead. The film was then titled My Girl Godfrey. Durbin enjoyed working with Borzage.

Durbin performs a medley of Russian folk songs including "Yamschtschick", "Kalitka" and "Two Guitars."
