= Northwest Stampede =

1948 film by Albert S. Rogell

- Original film poster
- Directed by: Albert S. Rogell
- Written by: Art Arthur; Lillie Hayward
- Starring: Joan Leslie; James Craig
- Cinematography: John W. Boyle
- Music by: Paul Sawtell
- Production company: Eagle-Lion films
- Release date: July 28, 1948
- Running time: 79 minutes
- Country: United States
- Language: English
- Budget: $2 million

Northwest Stampede is a 1948 American contemporary Northwestern film produced and directed by Albert S. Rogell. It stars Joan Leslie and James Craig. The film was shot in Cinecolor in Alberta and features the Calgary Stampede. Joan Leslie had been suspended by Warner Bros. and it was the second of two films she made for Eagle-Lion films.

== Cast ==
- Joan Leslie ... Chris Johnson
- James Craig ... Dan Bennett
- Jack Oakie ... Mike Kirby
- Chill Wills ... Mileaway
- Victor Kilian ... Mel Saunders
- Stanley Andrews ... Bowles
- Ray Bennett ... Barkis
- Lane Chandler ... Scrivner
- Flame ... Dan's Dog

== Production ==
The film was financed by a $650,000 loan from the Bank of America. When the producer failed to repay this because the film failed to earn enough money, the bank took over the film.

== See also ==
- List of films about horses
