= Marty Holland =

American screenwriter and author of pulp novels

- Born: Mary Hauenstein; 1919; Beaverdam, Ohio
- Died: 1971
- Occupation: Author

Marty Holland (born Mary Hauenstein, 1919 – 1971) was an American screenwriter and author of pulp novels.

Holland began her career as a typist in Hollywood, wrote several short stories for pulp magazines, transitioned to writing novels and screenplays, and ultimately saw two of her works adapted for the screen.

Her first novel, Fallen Angel, was published in 1945 and immediately adapted into the 1945 film of the same name directed by Otto Preminger and starring Alice Faye, Dana Andrews, Linda Darnell, and Charles Bickford. In 1946, Fallen Angel was banned in Ireland because of "indecency or obscenity". In 1946, Holland's second novel, The Glass Heart, was published. The Glass Heart was optioned by RKO with James M. Cain attached to adapt the screenplay but the film version was never completed. The film The File on Thelma Jordon (1950) was adapted by Ketti Frings from an unpublished story by Holland, directed by Robert Siodmak, and starred Barbara Stanwyck and Wendell Corey.

Two of Holland's novels were published as part of the French Série Noire: Fallen Angel was n° 270, published in 1955 as Le Resquilleur, and The Glass Heart was n° 355, published in 1957 as Pas blanc!.

Holland continued to write stories and screenplays and did uncredited writing for TV before dying of cancer in 1971. Following her death, a manuscript of Baby Godiva was found by her family and published posthumously in 2011.

== Bibliography ==
=== Novels ===
- Fallen Angel (1945), also published as Blonde Baggage
- The Glass Heart (1946), also published as Her Private Passions
- Fast Woman (1949)
- Darling of Paris (1949)
- Baby Godiva (2011), published posthumously

=== Novellas ===
- Terror for Two (January 1951 issue of Scarab Mystery Magazine)
- The Sleeping City (Fall 1952 issue of Thrilling Detective)

=== Short stories ===
- Night Watchman (March 1943 issue of The Shadow)
- Rain, Rain, Go Away (April 1943 issue of The Shadow)
- D.O.A.—East River (March 1944 issue of Street & Smith’s Detective Story Magazine)
