= Three Husbands (1951 film) =

1951 film by Irving Reis

- Theatrical release poster
- Directed by: Irving Reis
- Written by: Vera Caspary; Edward Eliscu; Gertrude Purcell
- Story by: Vera Caspary
- Produced by: Isadore Goldsmith (producer); Anthony Z. Landi (associate producer)
- Starring: Eve Arden; Ruth Warrick; Emlyn Williams
- Cinematography: Franz Planer
- Edited by: Louis Sackin
- Music by: Herschel Burke Gilbert
- Production company: Gloria Films
- Distributed by: United Artists
- Release dates: July 6, 1950 (London); November 4, 1950 (Boston); December 9, 1950 (Los Angeles); March 8, 1951 (New York)
- Running time: 78 minutes
- Country: United States
- Language: English

Three Husbands is a 1951 American comedy film directed by Irving Reis and starring Eve Arden, Ruth Warrick and Emlyn Williams.

== Plot ==
When recently deceased playboy Max reaches heaven, he is granted a wish. His request is to watch his three best friends, with whom he regularly played poker, for the next 24 hours. Each friend will receive a letter, and the next day, Max's will is to be read. Each letter states that Max had a romantic affair with the recipient's wife. With one, Max attended Friday symphony matinees and sipped tea. With another, he frequented night clubs and taught French. He repeatedly hired the third man's wife as his nurse through his long battle with heart disease.

Each husband reacts differently, as does each wife when she discovers that something has happened to cause her husband to distrust her. At the end of the 24 hours, each couple declares their intention to divorce, with mistrust and disbelief having split each relationship. The lawyer reads the will, stating that Max's great fortune has been left to the three wives, as he believes that marriage is stronger when a wife is not dependent on her husband. Max wrote the letters to show each of his friends how much his wife was worth, as each had begun to take her for granted. He believed that jealousy was the perfect motivator to make someone reappreciate what he holds dear.

Each wife reiterates her intention to divorce, and each husband apologizes and begs his wife to reconsider. The three couples all reconcile, everyone grateful for what Max had done.

== Cast ==
- Eve Arden as Lucille McCabe
- Ruth Warrick as Jane Evans
- Vanessa Brown as Mary Whittaker
- Howard Da Silva as Dan McCabe
- Shepperd Strudwick as Arthur Evans
- Robert Karnes as Kenneth Whittaker
- Emlyn Williams as Maxwell Bard
- Billie Burke as Mrs. Jenny Bard Whittaker
- Louise Erickson as Matilda Clegg
- Jonathan Hale as Edward Wurdeman
- Jane Darwell as Mrs. Wurdeman

== Production ==
Vera Caspary, who wrote the original story and cowrote the screenplay, was married to the film's producer Isadore Goldsmith. Caspary had previously written the screen adaptation for A Letter to Three Wives (1949), a film with a similar plot. Shortly before the film's American premiere, Caspary was asked about the relationship between the two stories and admitted: "I've sold the same story, thinly disguised, to Hollywood five times."

The film entered production in mid-February 1950 at Motion Picture Center Studios and wrapped approximately one month later.

== Soundtrack ==
- "Poor Chap" (Music by Herschel Burke Gilbert, lyrics by Edward Eliscu)

== Release ==
The film opened in the United Kingdom on July 6, 1950, long before its American premiere in Boston on November 4, 1950.

== Reception ==
In a contemporary review for The New York Times, critic A. H. Weiler wrote: "Although there is no special crime in an author borrowing from her own work, Vera Caspary has short-changed herself. For, in 'Three Husbands' ... Miss Caspary, who adapted 'A Letter to Three Wives' to the screen, has switched her jibe at imagined and authentic dalliance to the female animal. But where 'A Letter to Three Wives' was a dramatic, biting commentary, which often was uproariously funny, 'Three Husbands' is merely a slick sleight-of-hand, ably performed, but chucklesome only in spots."

Critic Edwin Schallert of the Los Angeles Times also compared the film unfavorably with A Letter to Three Wives, observing that Three Husbands "lacks the finer and more complete fulfillment of the earlier picture" and writing: "It does not seem as if any of three motifs in the plot is developed for its full value. 'Three Husbands' keeps falling a little short all the time as it goes."
