= Elizabeth Reinhardt =

American screenwriter

- Born: Mariam Elizabeth Neely; March 21, 1909; Ohio, USA
- Died: January 21, 1954 (aged 44); Los Angeles, California, USA
- Occupation(s): Screenwriter, TV writer

Elizabeth Reinhardt (née Neely) (sometimes credited as Betty Reinhardt) was an American screenwriter and TV writer known for films like Laura (for which she and her co-writers were nominated for the Best Adapted Screenplay Oscar).

== Biography ==
Elizabeth was born to Milton Neely (a mechanical engineer) and Vera McCabe in 1909, the eldest of three children.

After graduating from DePauw University, she began her career writing three Spanish-language films: La Buenaventura (1934), The Singer of Naples (1935) and Angelina o el Honor de un Brigadier (1935). She then sold Pardon Our Nerve to 20th Century Fox. She'd later work on English-language films like Laura (1944), Cluny Brown (1946), and Give My Regards to Broadway (1948).

Reinhardt was married to John Reinhardt, who directed Spanish-language films at Fox.

She moved in writing for TV in the 1950s, and died in 1954 at the age of 44 after a lengthy illness.

== Partial filmography ==
- Hit Parade of 1951 (1950)
- When My Baby Smiles at Me (1948) (adaptation)
- Give My Regards to Broadway (1948)
- The Homestretch (1947) (uncredited contributing writer)
- Carnival in Costa Rica (1947)
- Cluny Brown (1946)
- Sentimental Journey (1946)
- Laura (1944)
- His Butler's Sister (1943)
- She Got Her Man (1942)
- Maisie Was a Lady (1941)
- Gold Rush Maisie (1940)
- Everybody's Baby (1939) (story)
- Pardon Our Nerve (1939) (story)
- Angelina o el Honor de un Brigadier (1935)
- The Singer of Naples (1935)
- La Buenaventura (1934)
