= Cluny Brown (novel) =

1944 coming of age novel by Margery Sharp

- First edition
- Author: Margery Sharp
- Published: August 1944; Collins (UK); Little Brown (US)
- Pages: 270

Cluny Brown is a humorous coming of age novel by Margery Sharp, published in August 1944 by Collins in the UK and Little Brown in the US.

== Plot summary ==
The story follows the escapades of a plumber's niece, twenty-year-old Cluny Brown, in 1938 England. Cluny has high spirits and a constant desire for new experiences, though this leads the more staid members of her community to question whether she knows her place. As a consequence of a final London-based excursion of discovery, one outside the bounds of what Cluny's mentors consider proper, she is sent to be a Tall Parlour Maid at a charming country residence known as Friars Carmel. The simultaneous arrivals of the young son and heir of the house, a mysterious Polish professor, and a beautiful socialite add complexity to this adventurous tale of a young woman following her dreams and finding freedom in 20th-century England.

== Characters ==
- Clover 'Cluny' Brown, fearless adventurer and Tall Parlour Maid
- Andrew Frewen, heir to Friars Carmel
- Lady Alice Carmel, mistress of Friars Carmel
- Sir Henry Carmel, baronet of Friars Carmel
- Mr. Wilson, the neighborhood chemist
- Adam Belinski, distinguished Pole of letters
- Elizabeth 'Betty' Cream, London socialite
- Hilda Brewer, house maid
- Mr. Porritt, Cluny's plumber uncle
- Syrette, valet

== Adaptations ==
=== Films ===
The story was adapted into a 1946 film made by Twentieth Century-Fox, directed and produced by Ernst Lubitsch.

=== Comic strip ===
In 1945 Wallace Morgan created a newspaper comic adaptation of Cluny Brown.

== Book reviews ==
- A Work In Progress
- Bibliolathas
- Another look book
