= Flame (dog) =

Dog actor

Flame was a dog actor who starred in a number of movies, most notably as My Dog Shep (1946) and its sequel, as well as in the My Pal series of shorts and the Rusty series.

== Filmography ==
- My Dog Shep (1946)
- Out of the Blue (1947)
- For the Love of Rusty (1947)
- Night Wind (1948)
- Northwest Stampede (1948)
- My Dog Rusty (1948)
- Pal's Adventure (1948) (Short)
- Miraculous Journey (1948)
- Pal's Return (1948) (short)
- Shep Comes Home (1948)
- Rusty Saves a Life (1949)
- I Found a Dog (1949) (short)
- Dog of the Wild (1949) (short)
- Rusty's Birthday (1949)
- Pal, Canine Detective (1950) (short)
- Pal, Fugitive Dog (1950) (short)
- Pal's Gallant Journey (1951) (short)
- Cowboy G-Men (1952) – episode "The Golden Wolf"
- The Life of Riley (1954) – episode "The Dog Watch"
- The Young and the Brave (1963)

== See also ==
- List of individual dogs
