= Joseph LaShelle =

American cinematographer

- Promotional portrait of LaShelle, pictured with Fox's proprietary Fox Studio Camera
- Born: July 9, 1900; Los Angeles, California, U.S.
- Died: August 20, 1989 (aged 89); La Jolla, California, U.S.
- Occupation: Cinematographer
- Awards: Best Black and White Cinematography; 1945 Laura

Joseph LaShelle, ASC (July 9, 1900 – August 20, 1989) was an American cinematographer. He won an Oscar for his work on Otto Preminger's film noir Laura (1944), along with eight additional nominations.

== Career ==
LaShelle's first job in the film industry was as an assistant in the Paramount West Coast Studio lab in 1920. Instead of going to college as planned, he remained in the film industry after a promotion to supervisor of the printing department.

In 1925, Charles G. Clarke convinced him he should be a cameraman. He went to work with Clarke and after three months he was promoted to second cameraman, and he worked for various cinematographers at the Hollywood Metropolitan Studios. LaShelle was transferred from Metropolitan to Pathé where he began a 14-year association with Arthur C. Miller. He later went with Miller to Fox Films.

After working as a camera operator on Fox productions such as How Green Was My Valley (1941) and The Song of Bernadette (1943), he was promoted and became a cinematographer in 1943. He was a member of the A.S.C.

Some of his well-known works are the film noirs: Laura (1944), for which he won an Oscar; Fallen Angel (1945); and Road House (1948). He is remembered for his work with Otto Preminger and Billy Wilder.

== Filmography ==
- Whispering Smith (1926)
- Rocking Moon (1926)
- The Flame of the Yukon (1926) (assistant camera)
- The Bermuda Mystery (1944)
- Happy Land (1943)
- The Eve of St. Mark (1944)
- Take It or Leave It (1944)
- Laura (1944)
- Thunderhead - Son of Flicka (1945)
- Doll Face (1945)
- Fallen Angel (1945)
- A Bell for Adano (1945)
- Hangover Square (1945)
- Claudia and David (1946)
- If I'm Lucky (1946)
- Cluny Brown (1946)
- The Late George Apley (1947)
- The Foxes of Harrow (1947)
- Captain from Castile (1947)
- Road House (1948)
- The Luck of the Irish (1948)
- Deep Waters (1948)
- The Fan (1949)
- Everybody Does It (1949)
- Come to the Stable (1949)
- Mother Didn't Tell Me (1950)
- The Jackpot (1950)
- Mister 880 (1950)
- Where the Sidewalk Ends (1950)
- Under My Skin (1950)
- Elopement (1951)
- The Guy Who Came Back (1951)
- The 13th Letter (1951)
- Mr. Belvedere Rings the Bell (1951)
- My Cousin Rachel (1952)
- Les Misérables (1952)
- Something for the Birds (1952)
- The Outcasts of Poker Flat (1952)
- Dangerous Crossing (1953)
- Mister Scoutmaster (1953)
- River of No Return (1954)
- Marty (1955)
- The Abductors (1956)
- Storm Fear (1956)
- Run for the Sun (1956)
- The Conqueror (1956)
- Our Miss Brooks (1956)
- No Down Payment (1957)
- The Bachelor Party (1957)
- Crime of Passion (1957)
- The Fuzzy Pink Nightgown (1957)
- I Was a Teenage Werewolf (1957)
- Fury at Showdown (1957)
- The Naked and the Dead (1958)
- The Long, Hot Summer (1958)
- Career (1959)
- The Apartment (1960)
- The Outsider (1961)
- The Honeymoon Machine (1961)
- All in a Night's Work (1961)
- How the West Was Won (1962)
- Irma la Douce (1963)
- A Child Is Waiting (1963)
- Kiss Me, Stupid (1964)
- Wild and Wonderful (1964)
- The Fortune Cookie (1966)
- The Chase (1966)
- 7 Women (1966)
- Barefoot in the Park (1967)
- Kona Coast (1968)
- 80 Steps to Jonah (1969)

== Television ==
LaShelle also worked in television, such as the first episode of The Twilight Zone in 1959 ("Where Is Everybody?").

== Accolades ==
Wins

- Academy Awards: Oscar, Best Cinematography, Black-and-White, for Laura; 1945.

Nominations

- Academy Awards: Oscar, Best Cinematography, Black-and-White, for Come to the Stable; 1949.
- Academy Awards: Oscar, Best Cinematography, Black-and-White, for My Cousin Rachel, 1952.
- Academy Awards: Oscar, Best Cinematography, Black-and-White, for Marty; 1956.
- Academy Awards: Oscar, Best Cinematography, Black-and-White, for Career; 1960.
- Academy Awards: Oscar, Best Cinematography, Black-and-White, for The Apartment; 1961.
- Academy Awards: Oscar, Best Cinematography, Color for: Irma la Douce; 1964.
- Academy Awards: Oscar, Best Cinematography, Color, for How the West Was Won; 1964. Shared with: William H. Daniels, Milton R. Krasner, and Charles Lang.
- Academy Awards: Oscar, Best Cinematography, Black-and-White; for The Fortune Cookie; 1967.
