= Cluny Brown =

1946 film by Ernst Lubitsch

- Directed by: Ernst Lubitsch
- Screenplay by: Samuel Hoffenstein; Elizabeth Reinhardt
- Based on: Cluny Brown by Margery Sharp
- Produced by: Ernst Lubitsch
- Starring: Charles Boyer; Jennifer Jones; Peter Lawford
- Cinematography: Joseph LaShelle
- Edited by: Dorothy Spencer
- Music by: Cyril J. Mockridge
- Production company: Twentieth Century Fox
- Distributed by: Twentieth Century Fox
- Release dates: June 3, 1946 (New York City); June 12, 1946 (Los Angeles)
- Running time: 100 minutes
- Country: United States
- Language: English
- Box office: $1 million

Cluny Brown is a 1946 American romantic comedy film made by Twentieth Century-Fox starring Charles Boyer and Jennifer Jones. It was directed and produced by Ernst Lubitsch following a screenplay written by Samuel Hoffenstein and Elizabeth Reinhardt based on the 1944 novel by Margery Sharp. The music score is by Cyril J. Mockridge. The film is a satire on the smugness of British high society and the last film Lubitsch completed before his death in 1947.

== Plot ==
In 1938 London Cluny Brown meets Adam Belinski while she is fixing a plumbing issue at Mr. Ames's, and the two strike a chord. Later, at a party at Ames's, the self-obsessed Betty Cream is pursued by two young men: Andrew Carmel and John Frewen. Cream stumbles upon a sleeping Belinski, whom the men recognize as the prominent anti-Nazi author and professor. Andrew offers Belinski a place to stay at his family's residence outside London, before he leaves for the city.

Brown's uncle (also her guardian), disapproving of her unladylike behavior, sends her to work as the parlor maid for Andrew's family (headed by Sir Henry and Lady Carmel), much to her displeasure. Upon arrival, Brown is put under the contemptuous eyes of housekeeper Mrs. Maile and butler Mr. Syrette. At dinner, Brown is surprised to see Belinski. After dinner, Belinski is shown to a room with a nightingale under the window. Later, Belinski finds Brown and they realize that they are out of place at the Carmels' and make a pact to be platonic friends, even though Belinski is clearly interested in her.

One afternoon, Brown tells Belinski that she has been invited by chemist Jonathan Wilson to meet his mother. At Wilson's, Brown is amazed by Wilson's mannerisms and array of skills, which include playing the old-fashioned song "Oh, Don't You Remember Sweet Alice, Ben Bolt?" on his antique parlour pump organ. Meanwhile, Belinski rings Wilson's doorbell and disappears. Later, while the couple are out walking, they run into Belinski, who admits that Wilson is a good man for Brown. That evening, though, Belinski tries to discourage Brown by comparing Wilson with 'a freighter... in a quiet harbor' but this makes Wilson even more attractive to Brown.

Andrew, who had a row with Cream in London, is shocked to find that Cream is a guest at the Carmel residence the following day. Belinski persuades Cream to let Brown, her personal maid, off the rest of the evening so she may attend Mrs. Wilson's birthday party, where Wilson may announce his engagement to Brown. When something goes awry with the plumbing during the Wilsons' party, Brown cannot resist the chance to show her skill at plumbing and bangs loudly and disruptively with a wrench on the offending pipe until it is fixed, startling the Wilsons and their guests. Mrs. Wilson, expressing her disapproval, promptly retires for the night, and the guests, sensing that things have gone wrong, leave just as suddenly and quickly; Mr. Wilson is exasperated and has second thoughts about his intentions with Cluny Brown.

That evening, Belinski enters Cream's bedroom, asking her to be nicer to Andrew, but Cream threatens to scream if he doesn't leave, and when he praises, she screams. A furious Andrew believes Belinski was up to no good, but Lady Carmel orders her son to go straight to bed. In Cream's room, Lady Carmel tells her she ought to marry Andrew and Cream agrees to tell him so in the morning. The next morning, Andrew decides he will settle the score with a fight, but Belinski manages to charm him and it all ends peacefully.

Since the birthday party, Brown has been sick in bed, while Belinski suddenly announces his departure. He asks Maile to give Brown his parting present and wishes Brown well with Mr. Wilson. Just after Belinski leaves, Brown rushes out and rushes to catch up with him at the train station. She reveals that while Mr. Wilson was disappointed by her behavior that night, he will ask his mother to give her another chance. Instead, Belinski ushers her onto the train. He professes his love to her, promising that to support both of them, he will write a best-selling murder mystery. They embrace and kiss.

In the window of the "Fifth Avenue Bookstore", copies of Belinski's novels The Nightingale Murder and The Nightingale Strikes Again! are displayed. A stylish Belinski and Brown happen by and are delighted by the display. After a long kiss, a crowd gathers. While shaking hands with well-wishers, Brown swoons, and a cab is summoned (implying she is pregnant).

== Cast ==
- Charles Boyer as Adam Belinski
- Jennifer Jones as Cluny Brown
- Peter Lawford as Andrew Carmel
- Helen Walker as Betty Cream
- Reginald Gardiner as Hilary Ames
- Reginald Owen as Sir Henry Carmel
- C. Aubrey Smith as Colonel Charles Duff Graham
- Richard Haydn as Jonathan Wilson
- Margaret Bannerman as Lady Alice Carmel
- Sara Allgood as Mrs. Maile
- Ernest Cossart as Syrette
- Florence Bates as Dowager at Ames' Party
- Una O'Connor as Mrs. Wilson
- Billy Bevan as Arn Porritt, Cluny's uncle (uncredited)
- Charles Coleman as Constable Birkins (uncredited)
- Michael Dyne as John Frewen (uncredited)
- Christopher Severn as Master Ronald Snaffle (uncredited)

== Reviews ==
A New York Times review in 1946 called the film a "delectable and sprightly lampoon" and "among the year's most delightful comedies". A reviewer for Variety wrote "Cluny Brown is in the best Lubitsch tradition of subtle, punchy comedy, and his two stars make the most of it. It is a satire on British manners, with bite and relish."

== Radio adaptation ==
Cluny Brown was adapted to radio and presented on Star Playhouse on November 15, 1953, starring Celeste Holm in the title role.
