= Shep Comes Home =

1948 film

- Australian film poster
- Directed by: Ford Beebe
- Written by: Ford Beebe
- Produced by: Ron Ormond associate June Carr; Ira Webb executive Robert L. Lippert
- Music by: Walter Greene
- Production company: Lippert Pictures
- Distributed by: Screen Guild Productions
- Release date: December 3, 1948
- Running time: 60 minutes
- Country: United States
- Language: English

Shep Comes Home is a 1948 American film written and directed by Ford Beebe for Lippert Pictures. It was a sequel to My Dog Shep (1946).

== Cast ==
- Flame as Shep
- Robert Lowery as Mark Folger
- Billy Kimbley as Larry Havens
- Martin Garralaga as Manuel Ortiz
- Margia Dean as Martha Langley
- Sheldon Leonard as 'Swifty' Lewis
- Michael Whalen as 'Chance' Martin

== Production ==
Ford Beebe was attached in September 1948.

Filming started September 1948.

Robert L. Lippert, who financed, was hoping to turn the films into a series. However there were no more Shep films.

Margia Dean recalled "The dog always did it right on the first take—but the actors kept goofing up. (Laughs) That’s probably why they say actors don’t like working with animals. (Laughs)”

Margia Dean's performance led to her being cast in I Shot Jesse James.
