= The File on Thelma Jordon =

1950 film by Robert Siodmak

- Theatrical release poster
- Directed by: Robert Siodmak
- Screenplay by: Ketti Frings
- Story by: Marty Holland
- Produced by: Hal B. Wallis
- Starring: Barbara Stanwyck; Wendell Corey; Paul Kelly
- Cinematography: George Barnes
- Edited by: Warren Low
- Music by: Victor Young
- Color process: Black and white
- Production company: Wallis-Hazen
- Distributed by: Paramount Pictures
- Release dates: January 7, 1950 (Los Angeles); January 18, 1950 (New York)
- Running time: 100 minutes
- Country: United States
- Language: English

The File on Thelma Jordon is a 1950 American film noir directed by Robert Siodmak and starring Barbara Stanwyck and Wendell Corey. The screenplay by Ketti Frings, based on an unpublished short story written by Marty Holland, concerns a woman who pretends to fall in love with an assistant district attorney and uses him to escape conviction for the murder of her wealthy aunt.

== Plot ==
Late one night, Thelma Jordon arrives at the investigative office of the district attorney to report a series of attempted burglaries at her Aunt Vera's home. The chief investigator, Miles Scott, is out, but she meets assistant district attorney Cleve Marshall, an unhappily married man who would rather drink than return home. Cleve invites Thelma to join him for a drink and she agrees. He is soon embroiled in a love affair with the mysterious, seductive Thelma.

Thelma, who claims to be estranged from her husband Tony, lives with the wealthy, reclusive Vera. One night, Vera is shot dead in the house. Thelma calls Cleve, telling him that an intruder has killed Vera, and he helps her conceal evidence that might incriminate her. When the district attorney arrests Thelma as the prime suspect, Cleve begins undermining the case from the inside. He takes control of the prosecution and handles it so badly that the defense is able to convince the jury of reasonable doubt. Footprints belonging to an elusive "Mr. X"—in fact, Cleve himself, as he engaged in the coverup—further weaken the case. Thelma is acquitted and inherits Vera's money. More of her past is then revealed: she did kill Vera, and Tony, who is not her husband but her lover, had concocted the scheme so that both could become rich.

Cleve comes to the house, already aware that Thelma has been lying. She acknowledges the relationship with Tony, who strikes Cleve on the head, rendering him unconscious so that Thelma and Tony can escape. Unable to deal with her guilty conscience, Thelma causes a car accident that results in Tony's death and her own fatal injury. As she lies dying in the hospital, she confesses the truth to the chief investigator, Miles Scott. However, she does not incriminate Cleve as Mr. X, saying that she cannot reveal the man's name because she loves him. The chief investigator realizes that it must be Cleve, and he tells Cleve that he will be disbarred for his actions. Cleve replies that he had already been in the act of confessing to his complicity when he heard about the car accident, and he walks away to a new life.

== Cast ==
- Barbara Stanwyck as Thelma Jordon
- Wendell Corey as Cleve Marshall
- Paul Kelly as Miles Scott
- Joan Tetzel as Pamela Marshall
- Stanley Ridges as Kingsley Willis
- Richard Rober as Tony Laredo
- Gertrude W. Hoffmann as Aunt Vera Edwards
- Basil Ruysdael as judge Jonathan David Hancock
- Kenneth Tobey as Police Photographer (uncredited)

Wendell Corey's real-life children Robin and Jonathan play non-speaking roles as the daughter and son of his character.

== Production ==
Principal photography took place between February 14 and March 29, 1949. Location filming was performed at the Old Orange County Courthouse in Santa Ana, California and at the Los Angeles County jail.

The film's title varied slightly throughout its stages of production and release. Producer Hal Wallis purchased the unpublished short story by Marty Holland titled The File on Thelma Jordon in August 1948, and soon after, Barbara Stanwyck was announced as the female lead in a film of the same title. During the early stages of production, the title had been shortened to simply Thelma Jordon, but in March 1949, the studio announced that the title had been changed to File on Thelma Jordon (without "The"). When the film was released, it was marketed as Thelma Jordon although its official title had reverted to the original title of the short story, The File on Thelma Jordon.

== Release ==
Though the film carries a copyright date of August 1, 1949, it premiered in New York on January 18, 1950. It grossed $51.5 million in adjusted domestic box-office receipts.

== Reception ==
In a contemporary review for The New York Times, critic A. H. Weiler wrote:

"Thelma Jordon" is, for all of its production polish, adult dialogue and intelligent acting, a strangely halting and sometimes confusing work. And, though it is concerned with emotions. great emotional impact is not one of its shining attributes. Under Robert Siodmak's direction, the pace of this romantic melodrama is generally slow and generates some speed toward a climax which is not too startling. His principals, however, are carefully limned. ... "Thelma Jordon" takes an awfully long time to point out that the wages of sin are pretty high.

Critic Philip K. Scheuer of the Los Angeles Times wrote: "[L]ike links in a chain, practically each coincidence that takes place ... is directly connected with the coincidence that precedes and follows it. ... I think that it is a tall tale."

Variety praised the film, writing: "Thelma Jordon unfolds as an interesting, femme-slanted melodrama, told with a lot of restrained excitement. Scripting from a story by Marty Holland is very forthright, up to the contrived conclusion, and even that is carried off successfully because of the sympathy developed for the misguided and misused character played by Wendell Corey."

== Adaptations ==
The script was adapted for a 1950 radio episode of the Screen Directors Playhouse anthology series.

== Sources ==
- Greco, Joseph (1999). The File on Robert Siodmak in Hollywood, 1941-1951. Universal-Publishers. ISBN 9781581120813.
- Hannsberry, Karen Burroughs (2003). Bad Boys: The Actors of Film Noir. McFarland. ISBN 9780786437399.
- Spicer, Andre; Hanson, Helen (2013). A Companion to Film Noir. John Wiley & Sons. ISBN 9781118523711.
