= Vera Caspary =

American writer (1899–1987)

- Born: Vera Louise Caspary; November 13, 1899; Chicago, Illinois, U.S.
- Died: June 13, 1987 (aged 87); New York City, U.S.
- Occupations: Screenwriter, novelist, playwright
- Spouse: Isadore Goldsmith (1948–1964) his death

Vera Louise Caspary (November 13, 1899 – June 13, 1987) was an American writer of novels, plays, screenplays, and short stories.

Her best-known novel, Laura, was made into a successful movie of the same title. Though generally classified as a mystery novelist, Caspary felt uncomfortable with classifying herself in the genre. Yet her novels effectively merged women's quest for identity and love with murder plots. Independence is the key to her protagonists, with her novels revolving around women who are menaced, but who turn out to be neither victimized nor rescued damsels.

Following her father's death in 1924, the income from Caspary's writing was at times barely sufficient to support herself and her mother, and during the Great Depression she became interested in socialist causes. Caspary joined the Communist Party under an alias, but not being totally committed and at odds with its code of secrecy, she claimed to have confined her activities to fund-raising and hosting meetings.

Caspary visited Russia in an attempt to confirm her beliefs, but became disillusioned and wished to resign from the Party, though she continued to contribute money and support similar causes. She eventually married Isidor "Igee" Goldsmith, her lover and writing collaborator of six years. However, despite their successful partnership, her Communist connections led to her being "graylisted", temporarily yet significantly affecting their offers of work and income. The couple split their time between Hollywood and Europe until Igee's 1964 death, after which Caspary remained in New York where she wrote eight more books.

== Biography ==
Caspary was born prematurely in Chicago – her mother, Julia (née Cohen), over 40 with three nearly-grown children, had hidden the pregnancy. Her father Paul was a buyer for a department store. Caspary's parents were second-generation immigrants of German-Jewish and Russian-Jewish heritage. Being so much younger than her siblings, Caspary was reportedly spoiled as a child.

After Caspary graduated high school in 1917, her father enrolled her in a six-month course in a business college. By January 1918, Caspary found herself working as a stenographer. She went through a string of menial office jobs, looking for one where she could write instead of taking dictation from people with bad grammar.

While working at an ad agency composing copy, she invented the fictitious "Sergei Marinoff School of Classic Dancing", a mail-order dance course. Caspary wrote all the materials for this and other correspondence courses she had little knowledge of, including one that taught screenwriting. She was also producing articles for publications such as Finger Print Magazine, and the New York-based Dance Lovers Magazine. By 1922, she had turned down a raise from $50 to $75 to write from home and work on her first novel.

=== New York ===
By the time her father died in 1924, Caspary was fully supporting her mother, who was impressed that her daughter could "pound money out of a typewriter". Caspary moved to Greenwich Village in New York as Dance Lovers Magazine's new editor, living a Bohemian lifestyle. Here she met lifelong friend and collaborator Samuel Ornitz, then editor of Radio Lovers Magazine. Again leaving a job to write her own material, Caspary wrote her first novel, Ladies and Gents, which did not come out for two years due to a publisher's delay. When her mother fell ill, Caspary took another job writing a Charm and Beauty correspondence course.

While living in Greenwich Village, she was inspired to write The White Girl (January 1929) about a Southern black woman who moves North and passes as white. The reviews were better than Caspary had hoped; some speculated that it was written by a black woman who was passing.

By 1928, Caspary was writing for Gotham Life: the Metropolitan Guide, a free entertainment guide distributed through hotels. This job provided free tickets to theater shows, concerts, and nightclubs and introduced her to a wide circle of press agents and celebrities. While at Gotham Life, she lived under an assumed name in a "working girl's home". In March 1929, she again quit her job to write full-time, and her 1930 novel Music in the Street was set in a working girl's home.

Caspary moved back to Chicago and co-wrote the play version of Blind Mice with Winifred Lenihan, which featured an all-female cast and formed the basis for the 1931 film Working Girls. She and her mother moved to Connecticut to do rewrites on the play. However, it was disastrous – Caspary's inexperience with the process caused her to take everyone's advice, altering the text constantly. When she and Lenihan weren't present, the producers rewrote the play themselves. When Caspary returned, the original copy could not be found and the play closed in two weeks.

Back in New York in 1932, Caspary was supporting herself and her mother writing magazine articles, including interviews for Gotham Life. She also wrote Thicker than Water, a thinly veiled roman à clef about her own family. Caspary was nearly broke, but after bumping into a story editor from Paramount, she came up with Suburb, a 40-page story written over a weekend for which Paramount paid her $2,000. In her memoir, Caspary admitted that she rewrote and resold this exact plot eight times in the coming years. The week after she sold it to Paramount the first time, Liveright publishers gave her a $1,000 advance on Thicker Than Water.

=== Hollywood ===
Thicker than Water received good reviews, but by then her publisher Liveright was feeling the pangs of the Great Depression and Caspary was again nearly broke. In March 1933, a Fox story editor called and asked for another original like Suburb, which had been filmed as The Night of June 13. She spent that summer in Hollywood, writing a treatment for Fox and working on a play with Samuel Ornitz. Caspary could not sell that play and by winter she was broke again, but Ornitz insisted they write another and brought her back to Hollywood where her luck was always better.

Within a week she had sold three stories to studios and gotten a $500-a-week contract. She purchased a completely new wardrobe and brought her mother from New York. Like most people, Caspary did not get along with Harry Cohn, and after one spat, she no longer received writing assignments. Since her contract had five more months, she merely stopped going to the studio and spent her days at the beach while her agent picked up her paycheck. Again wanting to write her own material, she got her contract canceled and set sail for New York.

=== Communism ===
By this point in the Depression, many intellectuals were flirting with Socialist causes, and Ornitz tried to interest Caspary by giving her The Communist Manifesto, the Daily Worker and other materials. Though not truly committed, she allowed her work to be affected by changing attitudes, but found that having never been a proletarian, she could not write the great proletarian novel. She helped raise funds for causes and sign petitions but never became a true believer. Nonetheless, one of the last things her mother did before she died was to scold Caspary for associating with "filthy Reds".

Upon returning to Greenwich Village, Caspary was invited to join the Communist Party by a prominent playwright, and did so though under the alias of "Lucy Sheridan". Caspary found the Party's code of secrecy to be contrary to her search for truth and questioning of values, which had led her to join in the first place. Though she claimed to have never actively recruited anyone, she admitted performing Party chores such as fund-raising and hosting the fortnightly Confidences Club meetings at her home, which were mostly for socializing.

In April 1939, Caspary used the profits of a Hollywood story sale to travel to Russia to "see how people lived" in what the Daily Worker had described as a paradise. During her trip across Europe, she was nearly persuaded out of guilt to marry an Austrian Jew to get him to the United States, but due to slow paperwork she was saved that fate. She later learned that he made it to America on his own.

She traveled through Germany by train, being strip-searched at border crossings. She visited Moscow and Leningrad, visiting factories, seeing the "worker's paradise", and finding time to attend the ballet, where a Russian Jewish gentleman proposed to her during intermission. On her return trip through the Finnish border, the first-class car was empty, save for Caspary and Ivan Maisky, the Russian ambassador to Britain, who would have been carrying the ill-fated Russian offer for "collective security" to the Court of St James's.

Stalin's pact with Hitler disillusioned many Party members including Caspary. In her words, "Loss of faith is a slow process, and painful. A last desperate effort to cling to belief attacks the nerves. I became irritable, disliked my friends, slept badly, lost tolerance. Haunted by ghosts of deeds and statements. I felt filthy." By December 1939, she was actively trying to resign from the Communist Party; she was informed that she couldn't just exit, but could be asked to leave if she was brought up on charges. She called their bluff and agreed to it; however they were reluctant to let her go quietly, and agreed to call it a "temporary leave of absence". In January she closed up her house and moved back to Hollywood.

=== Laura ===
However, Caspary's conscience would not let her simply abandon causes. She continued to sign petitions, contributed money, wrote to congressmen and maintained her memberships in the Hollywood Anti-Nazi League and the League of American Writers. She also taught classes in writing screenplays to raise funds to bring refugee writers to America.

In June 1941, Germany attacked Russia, and Hollywood benefits for Russian war relief drew huge crowds. During this time, Caspary started tinkering with a murder mystery, but instead of producing an original screenplay she was encouraged to turn it into a novel. It was finished by October, and to get some perspective she went to work on a story about a night plane to Chungking for Paramount Studios. When the United States declared war on Germany and Japan in early December, that story was canceled, and Caspary asked to be laid off and returned happily to her murder mystery. During Christmas 1941, she typed "The End" on the last page of Laura.

1942 found Caspary working on a dramatization of Laura with George Sklar. While waiting for some meaningful war-related work to come from the Office of War information, she tried to enlist in the Army but was turned down. She had just met her future husband, a recent European émigré Igee Goldsmith.

Producer Dorothy Olney had taken an option on Laura, and Caspary traveled to New York to assist with preproduction on the play. Despite their efforts, Olney could not secure backing and gave up the option on the play. When Caspary returned to Hollywood, Igee was waiting for her with bouquets of red roses.

Caspary moved into a Mexican farmhouse on Horn Avenue across from Humphrey Bogart and began work on Bedelia. Igee, who had grown annoyed at the Hollywood habit of keeping producers on the payroll and not giving them anything to produce, was overjoyed at her request for assistance in working on Bedelia's rough patches. At Christmas 1942, their love affair was interrupted as every able-bodied British citizen was recalled to help with the defense of Great Britain. Igee, born in Austria, had emigrated to England in 1932 and would have to return there. She did not see him again for 13 months.

Meanwhile, every director who read Laura wanted to put it on the stage, but no producer or backer would finance it. Otto Preminger bullied Darryl Zanuck into buying the property for 20th Century Fox, convincing him that the production would be inexpensive. Tired of shopping it around and against her own advice, "Once a writer sells a story to Hollywood, they can kiss it goodbye", she sold it to Fox.

My agent wrote one of the worst contracts ever written. I signed it as carelessly as a five-dollar check. As I would be reminded in restaurants and parking lots, I had signed away a million dollars. Who would have thought that a film which for all its elegance, was not expensive, whose stars were not then considered important, would become a box office smash and a Hollywood legend?

=== Bedelia ===
Late in 1944, tired of the long separation from her love, Caspary devised a method to reunite with Igee. The war had made civilian travel difficult and going to Europe nearly impossible. However, Caspary cabled Igee that he could have the film rights to Bedelia for a British production if she could be brought over to write the screenplay, thus putting into motion a plan involving two British ministries, J. Arthur Rank, the State Department, Good Housekeeping, the Stork Club and the White House, which brought her to England. Good Housekeeping was running it as a serial, and Houghton Mifflin was publishing it in the spring. J. Arthur Rank could only pay a fraction of what a Hollywood studio could pay for the rights, but Caspary didn't want the money; she wanted Igee.

Herbert Mayes, editor at Good Housekeeping had conceived the idea of Murder at the Stork Club, and he chose Caspary to write the story. Thus during the nine weeks she was in New York waiting for her passport, Good Housekeeping paid all her expenses and all her Stork Club dinners were free. Unfortunately one night she was seated next to Otto Preminger, and they proceeded to start a fiery argument regarding the script for Laura and the resultant film. Caspary and Igee pestered every official they knew and didn't know on both sides of the Atlantic, trying to grease the wheels of bureaucracy. As part of the deal with the British Ministry of Information she agreed to write articles about wartime England for American newspapers and magazines. Finally on January 12, 1945, Vera Caspary disappeared from New York only to reappear on a dock in England, just in time to see the British stage production of Laura open at the Q Theatre in London on January 30, with Sonia Dresdel as Laura. "I should have never committed that murder", Caspary complained.

The English Harper's Bazaar also wanted Murder at the Stork Club, and its editor Ben McPeake, like Mayes in New York, continually checked on the story's progress. There were too many distractions in London for Caspary to write, but fortunately she had the loan of W. R. Hearst's castle in Wales, St Donat's. All but empty and abandoned during the war, it provided much-needed seclusion for her to write the story.

She returned to London and Igee, where they enjoyed the few months they had left, but when the war ended and the screenplay was finished, the Ministry of Information sent her packing back to Hollywood for another separation without a foreseeable end. Igee had to stay and finish the picture.

=== Igee ===
Though the success of Laura had increased her salary fivefold, Caspary was unhappy in Hollywood without Igee. Her work on a new novel was interrupted by preproduction on the doomed stage version of Laura. Unfortunately the play was dreadfully miscast, Miriam Hopkins was too old for the part (yet had much influence), the producer was inexperienced and intimidated letting Hopkins run "roughshod" over the production, the lighting designer was replaced as was the stage manager and finally the director himself. Caspary and her co-writer Sklar saw the work of a year destroyed day by day. The play ran for 44 performances.

By May 1946, Igee had returned to the U.S., and the couple lived openly together in their Hollywood Hills house. They were terribly happy in post-war Hollywood, jobs were plentiful, salaries high and the parties seemed endless – Caspary's newfound fame brought her into contact with anyone who was anyone. Her stories improved by Igee's contribution were selling at inflated prices, and her salary rose due to high demand for her work and her limited availability. Caspary made it a practice only to accept jobs of adaptation; she found it more creative and fun, as in the case of John Klempner's book Letter to Five Wives, filmed under the title A Letter to Three Wives. To streamline the film, one wife was eliminated by Caspary, and when the script reached production, Joseph L. Mankiewicz removed another one. Due to a loophole in the Academy Awards nomination rules, Mankiewicz alone was nominated and won the Oscar for Best Adapted Screenplay. However, when the same screenplay won the Writers Guild of America award for Best Written American Comedy, Mankiewicz was forced to share the award and credit with Caspary, the original adaptor.

Despite their arrangement and a previous wife long-abandoned in England, by 1948 Igee was anxious to marry Caspary, though she had serious reservations about the practice. After three years of physical separation, Igee got his divorce on the grounds of abandonment. While in Europe finalizing the divorce, Igee traveled to visit his grown son in Switzerland and, while there, bought Caspary a small chalet in nearby Annecy. After living together for the better part of seven years, they were married within the week.

Taking advantage of their new-found success and status, the couple formed a production company, "Gloria Films", producing the comedy Three Husbands with Eve Arden and Ruth Warrick, and the film noir The Scarf starring John Ireland and Mercedes McCambridge. Unfortunately, Caspary and Igee forgot the first rule of finance, "never use your own money", and had put all their own funds and savings into the company. Their films were contracted to United Artists, and when United Artists went into bankruptcy and restructuring in 1950, the films of Gloria Films were tied up in litigation and the couple lost everything. Many small production companies went bankrupt as a result of United Artists' troubles – Caspary could not afford to, as she would have lost future royalties for works she had written and any payments for reprints of her books. Igee was devastated at the loss; he never became the bread winner of the couple. In December, Caspary drove to MGM and sold them a story treatment for $50,000 with a 50% advance. In January, she sold them another for $45,000, and in February, sold one to Paramount for $35,000. This last sale, the couple deposited in New York, which was fortunate as it was a long time before they worked again in Hollywood.

=== Gray list ===
In 1950, Caspary was one of the women identified as communists in Red Channels. This right-wing publication was FBI-founded and funded and was part of the US government's anti-communist program, which overwhelmingly targeted women in media.

Hollywood in 1951 was the feeding ground for the House Un-American Activities Committee, the House's rabid anti-communist investigations pitted Hollywood's residents against one another. If people testified, they were "friendly" witnesses; if they were named as communist sympathizers, they were "blacklisted". Either way, the decision was made for them. The couple were preparing to leave for Europe, as Igee was negotiating a French remake of Three Husbands, when MGM abruptly and illegally questioned Caspary regarding her Communist links. They were duly worried, as they had just bought two expensive stories from her, and if she were named and blacklisted, they would not be able to release them.

Since Caspary had left the Party before she came to Hollywood, she told the truth about which committees she attended and the initiatives she had worked on, but the one thing they never asked was if she had ever been a member.

Caspary was concerned; if she was subpoenaed to appear she would not be able to leave the country unless she became a "friendly witness" and named names. On a lawyer's advice, the couple left the country as soon as possible. They remained in Europe, Igee going from studio to studio trying to finance new projects or remake old ones, finally inspiring Caspary to write a musical comedy, Wedding in Paris. It was while working in Austria on the musical adaptation of Daddy Long Legs, Caspary learned she had been added to the graylist and told to abandon the project. If someone appeared before the HUAC committee and refused to name names, they were blacklisted; if their file indicated that they had signed pledges, attended congresses or contributed to doubtful causes, they were graylisted. Caspary described the former as hell, the latter merely purgatory.

The couple returned to Hollywood early in January 1954, but found the climate in Hollywood had gone from chilly to severe. They left again after six months, and what followed were two more years of bad luck. In 1956, Caspary and Igee returned to Hollywood when the HUAC lost interest. A job was waiting for her; an old friend, Sol Siegel, had purchased the rights to the book Les Girls, and was eager for her to adapt it for the screen. However, MGM wouldn't employ Caspary unless she wrote a letter stating she had never been a member of the Communist Party; under such duress, she capitulated and wrote the letter. Years later, Caspary remembered George Cukor's Les Girls with Gene Kelly and Mitzi Gaynor as her most enjoyable studio experience.

=== Time out ===
The couple split their time between Hollywood and Europe. The novel Evvie, about two emancipated girls in the 1920s and heavily based on her own experiences, was begun in London, continued in New York, finished in Beverly Hills, and proofed in Paris. The novel won faint reviews, but Caspary considered it one of her best, and famed Chicago Tribune reviewer Fanny Butcher came out of retirement long enough to denounce it as obscene.

She could no longer work with the intensity and fervor of her youth, but she still needed to earn a living and pay their debts. Caspary even broke a twenty-year vow and took work from Columbia Pictures and the ever-irascible Harry Cohn. She reworked an idea that she had begun in Austria and that had been rejected in London, altering it to fit American situations, and to her shock 20th Century Fox offered $150,000 for it. They wanted it for Marilyn Monroe; a deal was made for the 100-page treatment of Illicit, the contract signed and the first payment sent, but then Monroe became undisciplined and unreliable and was suspended by the studio. Caspary completed a first draft, but the film was never made.

The good feeling from being financially secure for the first time in ages was lost when Igee was diagnosed with lung cancer. In between surgeries and bouts of illness, the couple traveled: Greece, Las Vegas, New England — all places they had meant to go. They traveled until Igee was too ill to do so; he died in 1964 while they were in Vermont.

Caspary returned to New York after Igee's death, where she published eight more books including The Rosecrest Cell, a study of a group of frustrated amateur Communists; and the memoir The Secrets of Grown-ups. None equaled the popularity of her early suspense work. In her 18 published novels, 10 screenplays and four stage plays, Caspary's main theme, whether in a murder mystery, drama or musical comedy, was the working woman and her right to lead her own life, to be independent.

Caspary died of a stroke at St. Vincent's Hospital in New York City in 1987.

== Works ==
=== Novels ===
- Ladies and Gents. NY: The Century Company, 1929
- The White Girl. NY: J.H. Sears & Company, 1929
- Music in the street. NY: Sears Publishing Co., 1930
- Thicker than Water. NY: Liveright, 1932
- Laura. Boston: Houghton Mifflin, 1943
- Bedelia. Boston: Houghton Mifflin, 1945
- Stranger Than Truth. NY: Random House, 1946
- The Murder in the Stork Club. NY: AC. Black, 1946
- The Weeping And The Laughter. Boston: Little, Brown & Company, 1950
- Thelma. Boston: Little, Brown & Company, 1952
- False Face. London: W.H Allen, 1954
- The Husband. NY: Harpers, 1957; London: W.H. Allen, 1957 (with dust-wrapper by George Adamson)
- Evvie. NY: Harper, 1960
- Bachelor in Paradise. NY: Dell, 1961
- A Chosen Sparrow. NY: Putnam, 1964
- The Man Who Loved His Wife. NY: Putnam, 1966
- The Rosecrest Cell. NY: Putnam, 1967
- Final Portrait. London: W.H. Allen, 1971
- Ruth. NY: Pocket, 1972
- Dreamers. NY: Simon & Schuster, 1975
- Elizabeth X. London: W.H. Allen, 1978
- The Secrets of Grown-Ups. NY: McGraw Hill, 1979
- The Murder in the Stork Club and Other Mysteries. Norfolk, VA: Crippen & Landru, 2009. Collection of novelettes.

=== Short stories ===
- "In Conference"
- "Marriage '48", Colliers, Sept–Oct 1948
- "Odd Thursday"
- "Out of the Blue", Today's Woman, Sept 1947
- "Stranger in The House", 1943
- "Stranger Than Truth", Colliers, Sept–Oct 1946
- "Suburbs"

=== Plays ===
- Blind Mice w/ Winifred Lenihan (1930)
- Geraniums in My Window; a Comedy in Three Acts, w/ Samuel Ornitz (1934)
- June 13; a Mystery-Drama in Three Acts, w/ Frank Vreeland (1940)
- Wedding in Paris, w/ Sonny Miller (1956)
- Laura, w/ George Sklar (1947)

=== Non-fiction ===
- A Manual of Classic Dancing. (as Sergei Marinoff) Chicago: Sergei Marinoff School, 1922

=== Film credits ===
- Working Girls, (1931; play "Blind Mice")
- The Night of June 13, (1932; story "Suburbs")
- Private Scandal, (1934; story "In Conference")
- Such Women Are Dangerous, (1934; story "Odd Thursday")
- Hooray for Love, (1935; contributor to treatment; uncredited)
- Party Wire, (1935; story; uncredited)
- I'll Love You Always, (1935; writer)
- Easy Living, (1937; story)
- Scandal Street, (1938; story "Suburbs")
- Service de Luxe, (1938; story)
- Sing, Dance, Plenty Hot, (1940; story)
- Lady from Louisiana, (1941; screenplay)
- Lady Bodyguard, (1943; story)
- Laura, (1944; novel)
- Claudia and David, (1946; adaptation)
- Bedelia, (1946; novel; screenplay)
- Out of the Blue, (1947; story)
- A Letter to Three Wives, (1949; adaptation)
- I Can Get It for You Wholesale, (1951; adaptation)
- Three Husbands, (1951; screenplay; story)
- Give a Girl a Break, (1953; story)
- The Blue Gardenia, (1953; story)
- The 20th Century Fox Hour, (1955; episodes)
- Les Girls, (1957; story)
- Bachelor in Paradise, (1961; story)
- Laura, (1962; TV; writer)
- Laura, (1968; TV; novel)
