= Bedelia (novel) =

1945 novel by Vera Caspary

- First edition cover
- Author: Vera Caspary
- Language: English
- Genre: Crime novel
- Publisher: Blakiston
- Publication date: 1945
- Publication place: United States
- Media type: Print (Hardback)
- Pages: 187 pp.
- OCLC: 8744835

Bedelia is a novel by Vera Caspary first published in 1945 about a blissfully happy newlywed couple in which the husband learns that his wife may have a criminal past. His growing suspicion and discovery of corroborating evidence lead him to think that she might be a serial killer, and that he could be her next victim.

Set in small-town Connecticut in the winter of 1913–14, Bedelia, whose eponymous heroine was called "the wickedest woman who ever loved" on the cover of an early edition of the book, is usually subsumed under the genre of pulp fiction. However, a 2005 annotated edition published by The Feminist Press is said to show that Caspary's novel can be seen as a contribution to feminist thought.

Bedelia is dedicated to film producer Isadore "Igee" Goldsmith, then Caspary's husband.

== Plot summary ==
Thirty-three-year-old Charlie Horst comes from an old Puritan family which for centuries has been one of the pillars of society in an unnamed small town in Connecticut. Educated at Yale and now working as an architect, he has lived in a grand old house—his parental home—all his life. At the beginning of the novel his domineering mother has been dead for less than a year, and since her death Charlie went on a summer holiday to Colorado Springs, where he met Bedelia Cochran, a young childless widow of great beauty, he immediately fell in love with her, brought her back home and married her.

Married life becomes Charlie Horst, so much so that on Christmas Day, 1913, he considers himself "the luckiest man in the world." Bedelia has turned out to be the perfect wife: exceedingly capable of running the household, a brilliant hostess, an obedient and submissive companion in need of protection by a strong man, imaginative, attractive, always well-dressed and well made-up, sexy, and good in bed. At their little Christmas party some of the town dignitaries are present, and everyone enjoys her ladylike ways. On top of it all, Bedelia is several months pregnant, turning Charlie into a proud father-to-be.

Among the guests at the Christmas party are his cousin Abbie Hoffman, a divorcee from New York; her friend Ellen Walker, a young journalist employed at the local paper who is still in love with Charlie although she has been rejected by him in favour of Bedelia; and Ben Chaney, a young painter who has recently arrived from nowhere and rented a cottage in the woods for the winter and who is increasingly regarded by Charlie as an intruder into his well-established circle of friends and acquaintances.

Then Charlie suddenly comes down with stomachache, and old Doctor Meyers, the Horsts' family physician, diagnoses a severe case of food poisoning. Charlie himself attributes his illness to overwork and brushes aside Doctor Meyers's suspicion that he may have been deliberately given poison as the ramblings of a senile quack who should have retired a long time ago. However, Doctor Meyers insists on a professional nurse being installed in the Horsts' home, and before her arrival at the house Chaney is seen meeting her at the railway station and talking agitatedly with her. Charlie is given strict orders not to eat or drink anything unless the nurse is present, and he gradually recovers.

At about the same time Ben Chaney discloses his true identity as a private investigator who has been hired to track down a serial widow whose previous husbands have all died ostensibly of natural causes and who is said to be living in this area under an assumed name. When Chaney announces the impending arrival of a relative of one of the deceased men who he claims will be able to recognize and identify Mrs Horst as that woman, Bedelia goes into the offensive and plans her disappearance—with or without her current husband. The witness's arrival is delayed due to a heavy snowstorm, which gives Bedelia more time to try to convince Charlie of her innocence and to talk him into leaving for Europe with her, a proposal which is met with utter disbelief and refusal on Charlie's part. In their snowbound house, Charlie's suspicion concerning his wife's past is steadily growing with each new life-story she serves him while he realizes that he still knows absolutely no hard facts about her former life.

During one of those cold and stormy nights Bedelia sneaks out of the house, leaving behind most of her personal belongings. However, being pregnant, she is too weak to make it to the station and is saved from certain death by freezing by Charlie, who finds her lying in the snow-covered road. As a consequence, she has to stay in bed with a severe cold for several days. Eventually the roads are cleared of snow, and the first vehicle to pull up in front of the Horsts' house is a delivery van with the groceries they have ordered by telephone. The delivery boy also leaves behind a large bag of food ordered by Ben Chaney to be fetched by the latter the moment he is no longer snowed in his cottage. Shortly afterwards, Charlie chances upon Bedelia sprinkling some white powder on a piece of Gorgonzola taken from Chaney's bag of groceries, and is immediately reminded of a story he was told by Chaney about the death of one of Bedelia's former husbands. But only now that he has caught her in the act is he finally convinced of his wife's guilt and categorically resists all her attempts at making him an accessory after the fact.

She tried, courageously, to smile at Charlie. "You wouldn't let them take me away, would you? I'm your wife, you know, and I'm sick. I'm a very sick woman, your wife. I've never told you, dear, how sick I am. My heart, I might die at any moment. I must never be distressed about anything. [...] I didn't ever tell you, Charlie, because I didn't want you to worry." This she said with a sort of determined gallantry, both sweet and bitter.

Gently Charlie removed her hands. Bedelia submitted humbly, showing that she considered him superior, her lord and master. He was male and strong, she feminine and frail. His strength made him responsible for her; her life was in his hands.

Charlie locks Bedelia in the bedroom and then goes downstairs to greet the first guests to arrive after the snowstorm, among them Ellen Walker. While he is flirting with her, Bedelia is slowly dying upstairs after having obeyed her husband's order to take her own poison.

== Major themes ==
Caspary's central theme is gender roles, a social construct she saw slowly dissolve as the 20th century progressed. In this respect, it made sense to her to set the novel at the beginning of the century, in pre-Rosie the Riveter times when women had few choices in life. Charlie Horst, full of the traditional values and double standards of morality inculcated upon him by his family, falls prey to the charms of such a traditionally-minded woman who has outwardly never overstepped the moral border society has imposed on her by having pre- or extramarital sex. Seen in this light, Bedelia just carries to extremes the role women have been ascribed: that of wife and mother. While he is entertaining Ellen Walker in the final scene of the novel, Charlie cannot help reflecting on his dying wife's station in life as a "professional wife":

Bedelia was good at her job as a wife, she knew all the tricks that makes home jolly and keep a husband comfortable. To her life with each husband she brought experience gained with his predecessor. Being a wife was her life's work and she was far more successful at it than those good women who think because they have husbands they are safe and can treat men like servants or household pets. To Bedelia each marriage was a pleasure cruise and she an amiable passenger, always amused and amusing, always happy to share the fun, uninhibited by the fear that any relationship would grow too important, because she knew the cruise would soon be over, the relationship severed, and she would be free to embark on a new journey.

Caspary, who wrote about the lives of career women in many of her other works (for example in her 1943 novel Laura), shows the limited range of options available to women who lived before the First World War. They could either conform to traditional gender roles and become a wife and mother or choose the less-travelled road of spinsterhood. A third option, new at the time, is shown in the character of Ellen Walker, who serves as a foil to Bedelia. Ellen is just as attractive as Bedelia but deliberately refrains from stressing her femininity. What is more, she is an independent young woman who not only earns her own living but also enjoys her work as a journalist. As an outward sign of her independence, she has taken up smoking cigarettes in public.

Rather than passing judgement on Bedelia, the third person narrator follows Charlie Horst's increasingly muddled thoughts and feelings without ever detailing Bedelia's motives.

== New edition and references ==
In 2005, The Feminist Press at the City University of New York restored Bedelia to print as part of their Femmes Fatales: Women Write Pulp series. This new edition includes an Afterword, "All My Lives: Vera Caspary's Life, Times, and Fiction", by A. B. Emrys (Barbara Emrys), a faculty member of the Department of English at the University of Nebraska at Kearney.

== Film adaptation ==
Immediately after Bedelia had been published in 1945, Isadore Goldsmith went about to prepare a film adaptation. The screenplay was co-written by Herbert Victor and Goldsmith himself, but although Caspary was consulted as well, she could not do anything about Goldsmith's decision to relocate the action to England and Monte Carlo and to update it to the present. In the film, the Carringtons, a British couple, are spending their honeymoon in Monte Carlo, where they are pestered by a young detective who poses as a fledgling artist. Caspary pointed out that unless the action of the movie were set before the First World War, the whole point she wanted to make in the novel about women's dependence on men—and Bedelia's deviant ways of circumventing that dependence—would be lost in the film, but Goldsmith was adamant.

The black-and-white movie, which was one of the few independent productions ever made at Ealing Studios, was released in 1946. It starred Margaret Lockwood as Bedelia Carrington, Ian Hunter as Charlie Carrington, Barry K. Barnes as Ben Chaney, and Anne Crawford as Ellen. The film was directed by Lance Comfort.

Caspary felt so strongly about the film's distorted message that she later wrote another screenplay based on her novel in the hope that it would be turned into a U.S. film, a project which was never realized.

In the NBC series Hannibal the character of Hannibal Lecter's psychiatrist, played by Gillian Anderson, whose complicity with and knowledge of his crimes is uncertain, is called Bedelia DuMaurier in reference to this work.

== See also ==
- Mary Elizabeth Braddon: Lady Audley's Secret (1862) (murderess who has assumed a new identity feels cornered when the past catches up with her)
- James M. Cain: The Postman Always Rings Twice (1934) (adulterous couple plans the murder of the woman's husband)
- Wilkie Collins: Armadale (1866) (the villainess of the novel, Lydia Gwilt, a beautiful, sensual temptress, bigamist, dope addict, forger, and murderess, has been referred to as fiction's first femme fatale)
- Gustave Flaubert: Madame Bovary (1856) (disillusionment with married life and motherhood in 19th century France leads a woman to adultery and suicide)
- Patricia Highsmith: This Sweet Sickness (1961) (mentally deranged man leads a double life)
- Ira Levin: The Stepford Wives (1972) (obedient suburban wives turn out to be gynoids)
- Cornell Woolrich: Waltz Into Darkness (1947) (no love lost by mail-order bride in turn-of-the-century New Orleans who is only after her husband's money)
- Hush... Hush, Sweet Charlotte (Robert Aldrich; U.S., 1964 film) (family secrets including an unsolved murder and ensuing psychological suspense)
