= Isadore Goldsmith =

Austrian film producer (1893–1964)

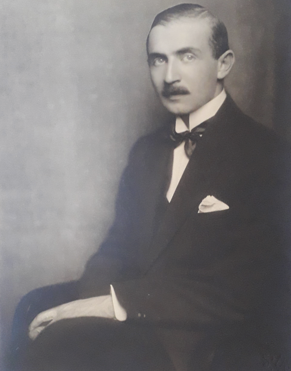
- Born: May 26, 1893; Vienna, Austria-Hungary
- Died: October 8, 1964 (aged 71); Putney, Vermont, U.S.
- Other name: Isidore Goldschmidt
- Occupations: Screenwriter, producer
- Years active: 1936-53
- Spouse: Vera Caspary

Isadore Goldsmith (26 May 1893 – 8 October 1964) was an Austrian film producer. During the 1930s and 1940s he worked in the British film industry after fleeing from Berlin following the Nazi rise to power. He was married to the novelist Vera Caspary.

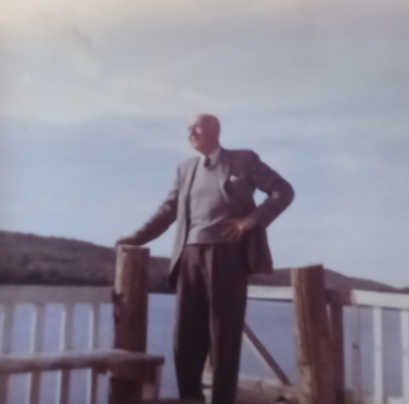
IG in his late 60s

== Selected filmography ==
- Whom the Gods Love (1936)
- Southern Roses (1936)
- Under Secret Orders (1937)
- The Lilac Domino (1937)
- I Killed the Count (1939)
- The Stars Look Down (1940)
- Hatter's Castle (1942)
- The Voice Within (1946)
- Bedelia (1946)
- Three Husbands (1951)

== Bibliography ==
- Brinson, Charmian, Dove, Richard & Taylor, Jennifer. Immortal Austria?: Austrians in Exile in Britain. Rodopi, 2007.
