= Samuel Hoffenstein =

Russian-born American screenwriter and composer

Samuel "Sam" Hoffenstein (8 October 1890 – 6 October 1947) was a screenwriter and a musical composer. Born in Odessa (now Ukraine), he emigrated to the United States and began a career in New York City as a newspaper writer and in the entertainment business. In 1931 he moved to Los Angeles, where he lived for the rest of his life and wrote the scripts for over thirty movies. These movies included Dr. Jekyll and Mr. Hyde (1931), The Miracle Man (1932), Phantom of the Opera (1943), The Wizard of Oz (1939), Tales of Manhattan (1942), Flesh and Fantasy (1943), Laura (1944), and Ernst Lubitsch's Cluny Brown (1946).

In addition, Hoffenstein, along with Cole Porter and Kenneth Webb, helped compose the musical score for Gay Divorce (1933), the stage musical that became the film The Gay Divorcee (1934).

He died in Los Angeles, California. A book of his verse, Pencil in the Air, was published three days after his death to critical acclaim. Another book of his work was published in 1928, titled Poems in Praise of Practically Nothing. The book contained some of his work that had been formerly published in the New York World, the New York Tribune, Vanity Fair, the D. A. C. News, and Snappy Stories.

== Works ==
- Life Sings A Song, (1916)
- Poems In Praise Of Practically Nothing, (1928)
- Year In, You're Out, (1930)
- A Treasure Of Humorous Verse, (1946)
- Pencil In The Air, (1947)
- Complete Poetry, (1954)

== See also ==
- List of Russian Academy Award winners and nominees
