= The 20th Century Fox Hour =

American TV series (1955–1957)

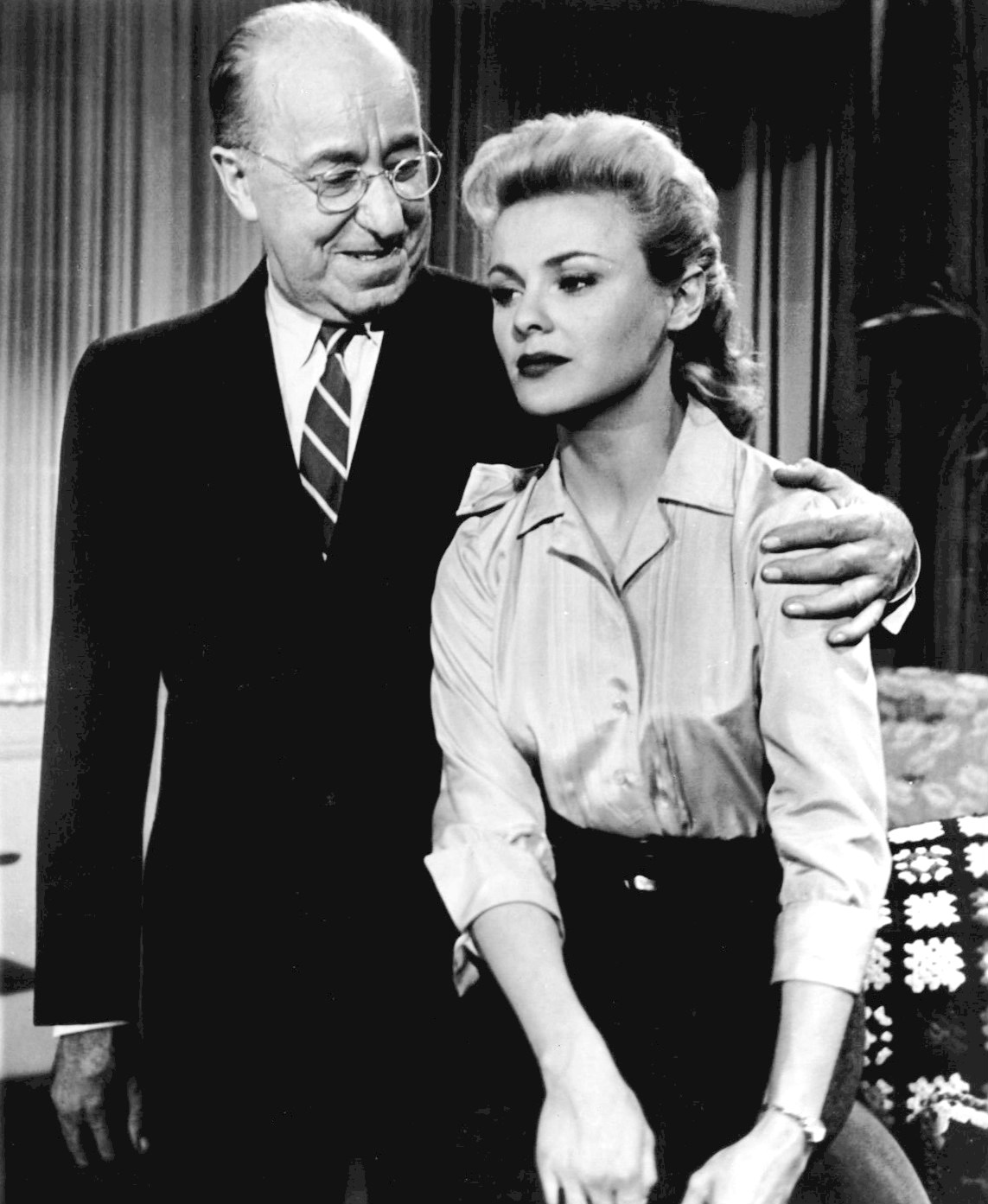
- Ed Wynn and Kathleen Crowley in "The Great American Hoax"
- Genre: Anthology
- Presented by: Joseph Cotten (1955-56); Robert Sterling (1956-57)
- Country of origin: United States
- Original language: English
- No. of seasons: 2
- No. of episodes: 37

Production
- Running time: 48–50 minutes
- Production company: TCF Television Productions

Original release
- Network: CBS
- Release: October 5, 1955 – June 12, 1957

The 20th Century Fox Hour is an American drama anthology series televised in the United States on CBS from 1955 to 1957. Some of the shows in this series were restored, remastered and shown on the Fox Movie Channel in 2002 under the title Hour of Stars (its title when the series was originally syndicated after 1957). The season one episode Overnight Haul, starring Richard Conte and Lizabeth Scott, was released in Australia as a feature film.

== Characters and stories ==
Presenting both originals and remakes, The 20th Century Fox Hour was telecast on Wednesday nights at 10pm, alternating each week with The U.S. Steel Hour. Many of the programs were shortened versions of classic 20th Century Fox films, remade with a far lower budget than the originals. Films receiving this treatment included The Ox-Bow Incident, The Late George Apley and Miracle on 34th Street. Some were retitled; Man on the Ledge was a remake of Fourteen Hours (1951).

== Guest stars ==
Guest stars on the series included Bette Davis, Joan Fontaine, Gary Merrill, Thomas Mitchell and Teresa Wright. Steve McQueen made an appearance before he became a major star. Child actor Johnny Washbrook appeared three times on the series while he was also in the lead role of the Western series, My Friend Flicka. Judson Pratt appeared as MacIntyre in the 1956 episode, "The Moneymaker". Child actress Beverly Washburn appeared as Ruthie in "The Hefferan Family" (1956) and as the character Kate as a girl in "Men in Her Life" (1957).

Following his The Philco Television Playhouse years, Paddy Chayefsky's The Great American Hoax, starring Ed Wynn, was seen May 15, 1957 during the second season. This script was actually a rewrite of his earlier Fox film, As Young as You Feel (1951) with Monty Woolley and Marilyn Monroe. Lizabeth Scott appeared in the season one episode Overnight Haul. The episode was later released in Australia as a feature film, after her final starring role in 1957's Loving You and many of the films in the series were released in the UK as supporting films in the late 1950s.

== Episodes ==
=== Season 1 ===
Episode #	Title	Original Airdate	Guest Star
1	"Cavalcade"	October 5, 1955	Michael Wilding, Merle Oberon, Carolyn Jones
2	"A Portrait of Murder"	October 19, 1955	Dana Wynter, George Sanders, Robert Stack
3	"The Ox-Bow Incident"	November 2, 1955	Robert Wagner, Raymond Burr
4	"The Late George Apley"	November 16, 1955	Raymond Massey, Joanne Woodward
5	"Christopher Bean"	November 30, 1955	Mildred Natwick, Allyn Joslyn
6	"The Miracle on 34th Street"	December 14, 1955	Thomas Mitchell, Teresa Wright, Sandy Descher
7	"Man on the Ledge"	December 28, 1955	Cameron Mitchell, Richard Collier, Joey Ray
8	"Yacht on the High Sea"	January 11, 1956	Gary Merrill, Nina Foch
9	"One Life"	January 25, 1956	Dane Clark, Audrey Totter
10	"Crack-Up"	February 8, 1956	Bette Davis, Gary Merrill, Virginia Grey, John M. Pickard
11	"In Times Like These"	February 22, 1956	Macdonald Carey, Fay Wray
12	"Deception"	March 7, 1956	Linda Darnell, Alan Napier
13	"Gun in His Hand"	April 4, 1956	Debra Paget, Robert Wagner
14	"Mr. Belvedere"	April 18, 1956	Reginald Gardiner, Eddie Bracken, Zasu Pitts
15	"Broken Arrow"	May 2, 1956	John Lupton, Roy Roberts
16	"Overnight Haul"	May 16, 1956	Lizabeth Scott, Robert Foulk, Forrest Lewis
17	"The Empty Room"	May 30, 1956	Alan Napier, Victoria Ward
18	"The Hefferan Family"	June 6, 1956	Carolyn Jones, Mark Damon

=== Season 2 ===
Episode #	Title	Original Airdate	Notable Guest Stars
1	"Child of the Regiment"	October 3, 1956	Louise Arthur, Paul Birch
2	"Stranger in the Night"	October 17, 1956	Joan Fontaine, Tom Conway
3	"The Moneymaker"	October 31, 1956	James Burke, Judson Pratt, Spring Byington
4	"Smoke Jumpers"	November 14, 1956	Robert Armstrong, Robert Bray
5	"The Last Patriarch"	November 28, 1956	John Cassavetes, Virginia Leith
6	"Men Against Speed "	December 12, 1956	Mona Freeman, Farley Granger
7	"Operation Cicero"	December 26, 1956	Ricardo Montalbán, Leon Askin, Romney Brent
8	"End of a Gun"	January 9, 1957	John Drew Barrymore, Lyle Bettger
9	"False Witness"	January 23, 1957	Fred MacMurray, Claude Akins, Morris Ankrum
10	"Springfield Incident"	February 6, 1957	Walter Coy as Stephen A. Douglas, Tom Tryon, Lloyd Corrigan, Alan Hale, Jr.
11	"Man of the Law"	February 20, 1957	Denver Pyle, Marsha Hunt
12	"City in Flames"	March 6, 1957	Jack Albertson, Anne Jeffreys, Kevin McCarthy
13	"Deadline Decision"	March 20, 1957	Charles Bickford, Whit Bissell
14	"The Still Trumpet"	April 3, 1957	Douglas Dick, James Griffith (an adaptation of Two Flags West with that film's co-star, Dale Robertson, playing the role played by Joseph Cotten in the film)
15	"Men in Her Life"	April 17, 1957	Parley Baer, Sheila Bromley
16	"Deep Water"	May 1, 1957	Richard Arlen, Steve McQueen
17	"The Great American Hoax"	May 15, 1957	Ed Wynn, Jerry Paris
18	"Threat to a Happy Ending"	May 29, 1957	Mabel Albertson, William Bendix, Jean Byron
19	"The Marriage Broker" (Series Finale)	June 12, 1957	Ellen Corby, Parley Baer, Kipp Hamilton

== Production ==
Michel Kraike produced the show, and Peter Godfrey directed. General Electric sponsored the program until February 6, 1957, when Revlon became the sponsor.
