= Laura (1944 film) =

Film by Otto Preminger

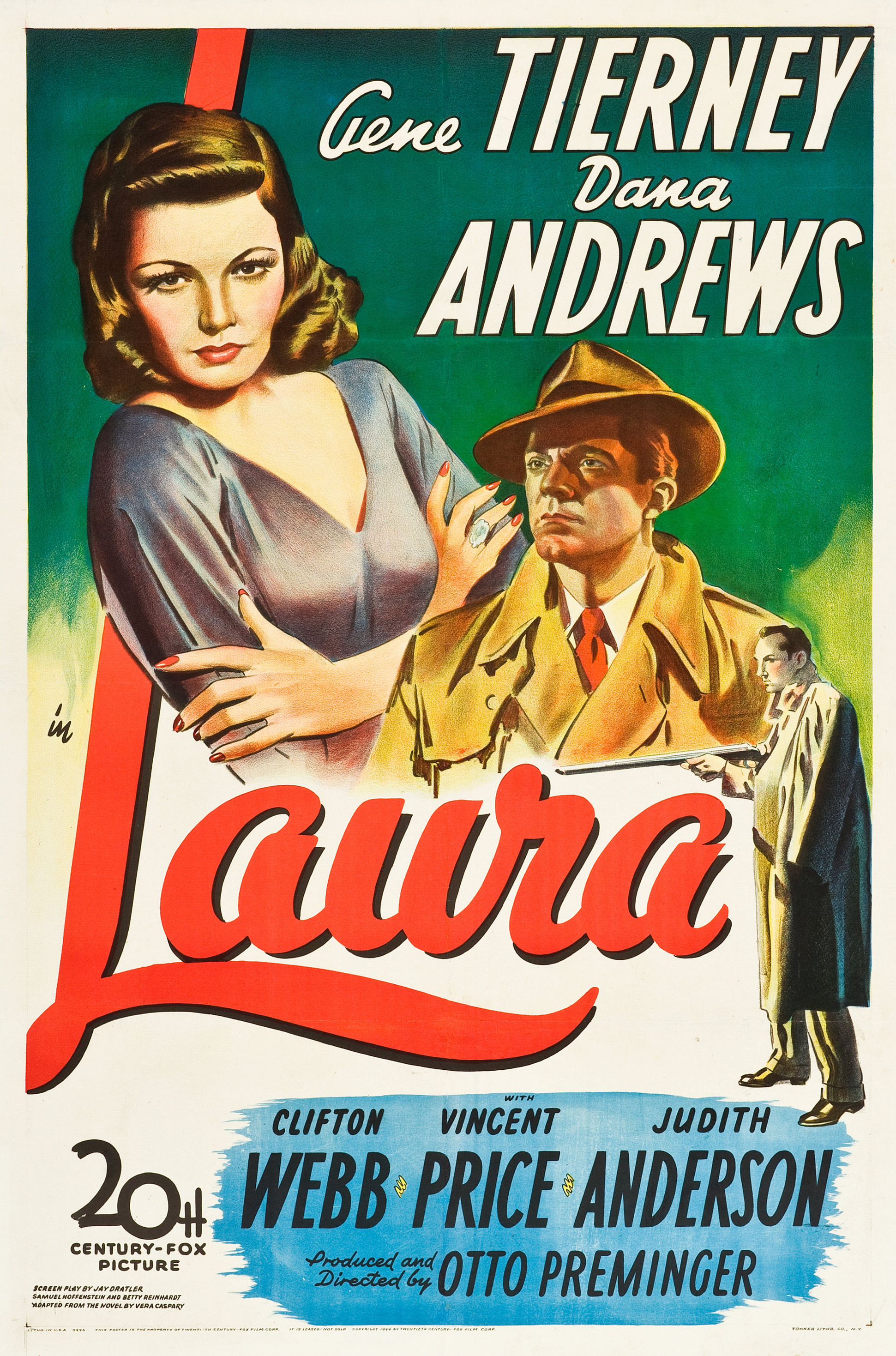
- Theatrical release poster
- Directed by: Otto Preminger
- Screenplay by: Jay Dratler; Samuel Hoffenstein; Betty Reinhardt; Ring Lardner Jr. (uncredited)
- Based on: Laura by Vera Caspary
- Produced by: Otto Preminger
- Starring: Gene Tierney; Dana Andrews; Clifton Webb; Vincent Price; Judith Anderson
- Cinematography: Joseph LaShelle
- Edited by: Louis Loeffler
- Music by: David Raksin
- Distributed by: 20th Century Fox
- Release date: October 11, 1944
- Running time: 88 minutes
- Country: United States
- Language: English
- Budget: $1.02 million
- Box office: $2 million (US and Canadian rentals)

Laura is a 1944 American film noir produced and directed by Otto Preminger. It stars Gene Tierney and Dana Andrews, along with Clifton Webb, Vincent Price, and Judith Anderson.

The screenplay by Jay Dratler, Samuel Hoffenstein, and Betty Reinhardt is based on the 1943 novel Laura by Vera Caspary. Laura received five Oscar nominations, including for Best Director, winning for Best Black and White Cinematography.

In 1999, Laura was selected for preservation in the United States National Film Registry by the Library of Congress as being "culturally, historically, or aesthetically significant". The American Film Institute named it one of the 10 best mystery films of all time, and it also appears on Roger Ebert's "Great Movies" series.

== Plot ==
Film trailer

New York City Police Department Detective Mark McPherson investigates the murder of young, beautiful, successful advertising executive Laura Hunt, killed by a shotgun blast to the face just inside her apartment doorway. He first interviews worldly newspaper columnist Waldo Lydecker, an imperious, effete older man who relates how he met Laura and became her mentor. She became his platonic friend and steady companion; wishing more, he used his considerable fame, influence, and connections, to advance her career.

Mark also questions Laura's parasitic playboy fiancé, Shelby Carpenter, a "kept man" tethered to Laura's wealthy socialite aunt, Ann Treadwell. Ann is in love with Shelby; she tolerates his infatuation with Laura out of practical acceptance of Shelby's need for the affection of a woman closer to his age. Bessie Clary, Laura's loyal and distraught housekeeper, is also questioned by Mark. Through the testimony of Laura's friends and reading her letters and diary, Mark becomes obsessed with Laura―so much so that Waldo finally accuses him of falling in love with a dead woman. Mark also learns that Waldo was jealous of Laura's suitors, using his newspaper column and influence to keep them at bay.

One night, Mark falls asleep in Laura's apartment in front of her portrait. Awakened by a woman entering with her own key, he is shocked to discover it is Laura. She finds a dress in her closet that belonged to one of her models, Diane Redfern. Mark concludes that the body assumed to be Laura was actually Diane, drawn there for a liaison by Shelby while Laura was away at her country house. With Laura still alive, uncovering the killer becomes even more urgent. By tapping Laura's phone, Mark follows her to a meeting with Shelby, after which Shelby drives to her country house to retrieve a shotgun. When confronted, Shelby claims he did not come forward with the information that Laura was alive because he was panicked. He explains the shotgun by saying he intended to give it to Laura for protection. Mark tests the shotgun against the ballistics from Diane's body and finds that it does not match.

At a party celebrating Laura's return, Mark arrests Laura for Diane's murder. After questioning her, he becomes convinced she is innocent and does not love Shelby. He searches Waldo's apartment, where he notices a clock identical to the one in Laura's apartment. Upon closer inspection, he discovers it has a secret compartment. Mark then returns to Laura's apartment. Waldo is there and observes a growing bond between Laura and the detective. Waldo insults Mark and is sent away by Laura, but he pauses on the stairwell outside. Mark examines Laura's clock and finds the shotgun that killed Diane, but he leaves it there. Laura is finally confronted with the truth that Waldo is the murderer.

Mark and Laura kiss, then he locks her in her apartment, warning her not to admit anyone. After Mark leaves, Waldo slips in by the kitchen entrance, retrieves the shotgun, and tries to kill Laura, saying that if he cannot have her, no one can. She dodges his shot and escapes just as Mark arrives. Mark's sergeant shoots down Waldo. As he dies, Waldo whispers, "Goodbye, Laura. Goodbye, my love."

== Cast ==
- Gene Tierney as Laura Hunt
- Dana Andrews as Mark McPherson
- Clifton Webb as Waldo Lydecker
- Vincent Price as Shelby Carpenter
- Judith Anderson as Ann Treadwell
- Dorothy Adams as Bessie Clary, Laura's maid (uncredited)
- James Flavin as Det. McAvity (uncredited)
- Clyde Fillmore as owner of Bullitt & Co. ad agency (uncredited)
- Ralph Dunn as Fred Callahan (uncredited)
- William Forrest as important client (uncredited)
- Kathleen Howard as Louise, Ann's cook (uncredited)
- Larry Steers as man dining with Laura (uncredited)
- Cara Williams as secretary in Laura's office (uncredited)

== Production ==
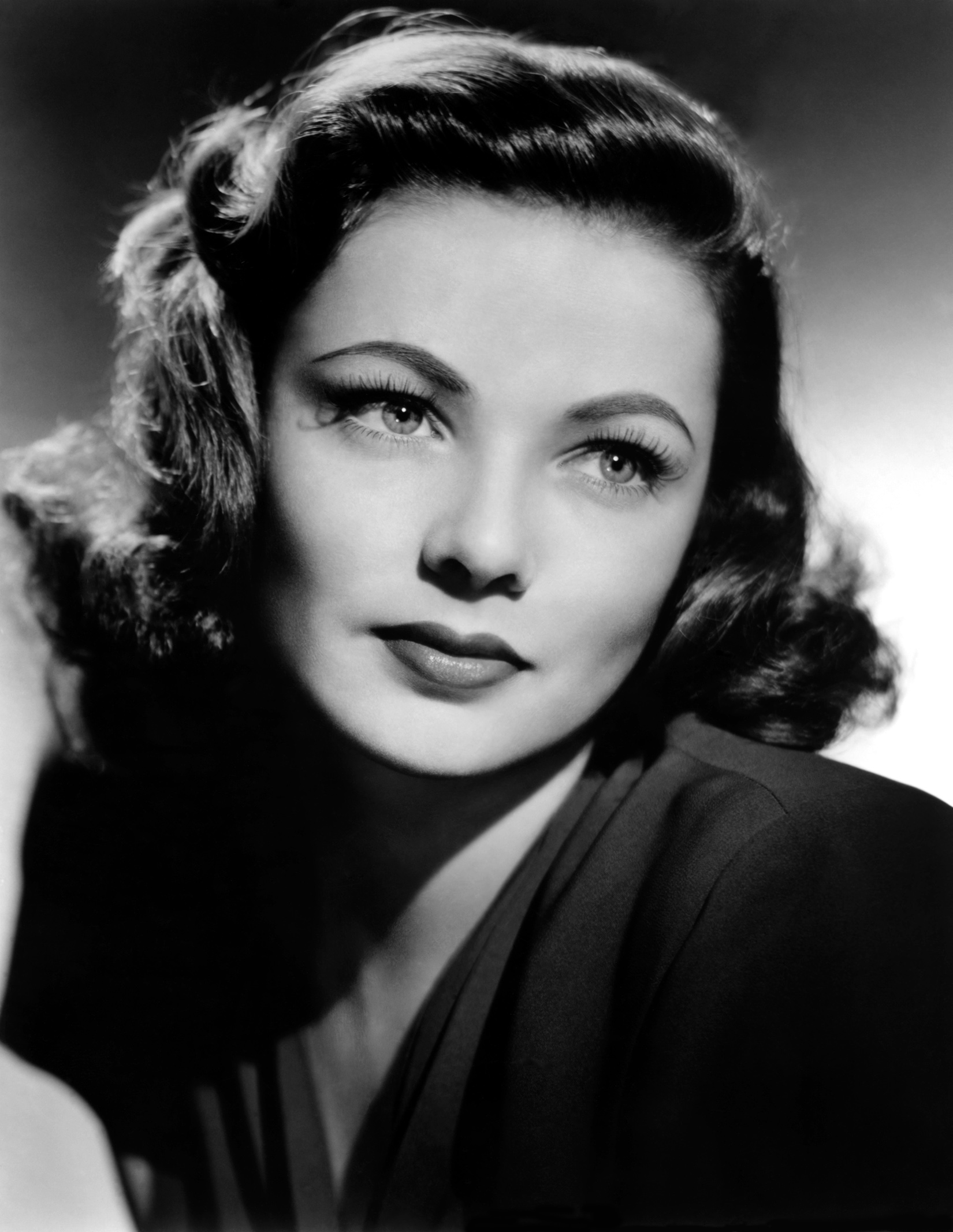
Gene Tierney in a publicity photo

Otto Preminger was looking for a theatrical project to direct and first became aware of Vera Caspary's story when her agent offered him the first draft of a play called Ring Twice for Laura. Preminger liked the high-society setting and the unusual plot twist, but he felt the work needed a major revision and offered to rewrite it with its author. Caspary and he disagreed about the direction they should take it, and she opted to collaborate instead with writer George Sklar. Marlene Dietrich expressed interest in portraying the title character, but without the attachment of Dietrich or another major star, Caspary was unable to find a producer willing to finance a national tour or a Broadway run and abandoned the project.

Caspary eventually adapted the play for both a novel with the same title and a sequel, which she titled simply Laura. They were both purchased by 20th Century Fox for $30,000. Fox announced George Sanders and Laird Cregar as the leads.

Interim studio head William Goetz, serving in that capacity while Darryl F. Zanuck was fulfilling his military duty, assigned Preminger the task of developing the books for the screen. Preminger began working with Jay Dratler, Samuel Hoffenstein, and Betty Reinhardt. Recalling the differences of opinion Caspary and he had, Preminger opted not to involve her until the first draft was completed. He sensed the more interesting character was not Laura, but Waldo Lydecker, and expanded his role accordingly. Caspary was unhappy with the plot changes, though.

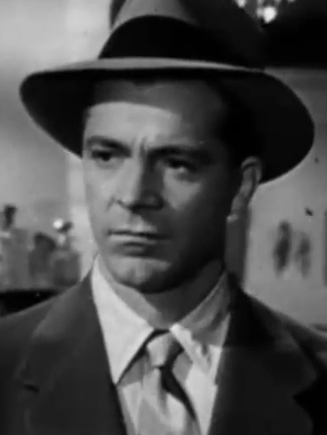
Dana Andrews as Det. Mark McPherson

Zanuck, with whom Preminger previously had clashed, returned to the studio and was angered to discover Goetz had rehired his nemesis. In retaliation, he announced that Preminger could produce Laura but not direct it and assigned him to helm In the Meantime, Darling instead. Several directors, including Lewis Milestone, were offered and rejected Laura until Rouben Mamoulian finally agreed to direct.

Mamoulian immediately ignored all of Preminger's directives as producer and began to rewrite the script. To Preminger's dismay, he cast Laird Cregar, known for his portrayal of Jack the Ripper in The Lodger, in the key role of Lydecker. The producer felt casting an actor with a reputation for playing sinister roles would lead the audience to become suspicious of Lydecker earlier than necessary. He favored Clifton Webb, a noted Broadway actor, who had not appeared before the cameras since 1930, and who at that time was performing in the Noël Coward play Blithe Spirit in Los Angeles.

Fox casting director Rufus LeMaire and Zanuck both objected to Webb because of his effeminate mannerisms, which were exactly what Preminger felt suited the character. Preminger filmed the actor delivering a monologue from the Coward play, and Zanuck agreed that Webb was perfect for the role. Zanuck was similarly campaigning for actor Reginald Gardiner to play the role of Shelby, though Fox contractee Vincent Price finally got the role.

Filming began on April 27, 1944, and from the start, Mamoulian had problems with his cast. He offered relative newcomers Gene Tierney and Dana Andrews little support, allowed theatrically trained Judith Anderson to play to the balcony instead of reining in her performance, and virtually ignored Webb, who had learned that the director was unhappy with his casting.

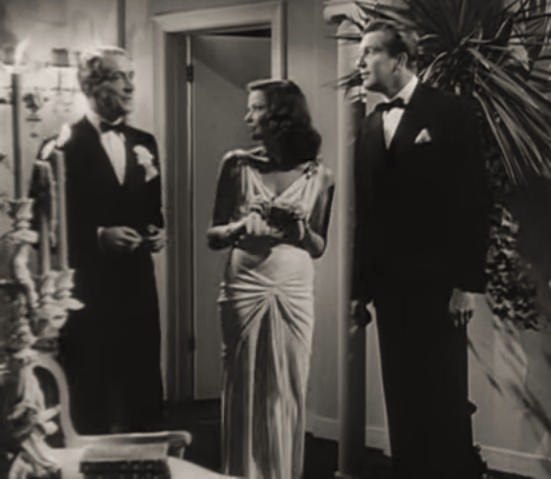
Webb, Tierney, and Price in the film's trailer

After viewing the early rushes, Zanuck called a meeting with Mamoulian and Preminger, each of whom blamed the other for the problems on the set. Preminger finally convinced Zanuck that the material needed a more subtle approach than Mamoulian was willing to give it, and the defeated studio head, in frustration, reluctantly allowed Preminger to dismiss Mamoulian and direct the film himself. Preminger immediately hired a new cinematographer and scenic designer and replaced the portrait of Laura – a crucial element of the film; Mamoulian's wife Azadia had painted the original portrait, but Preminger replaced that with an enlarged photograph (taken by Fox photographer Frank Polony) of Tierney, lightly dabbed with oils to give it the ethereal effect he wanted.

Preminger initially experienced resistance from his cast, who had been led to believe Preminger was unhappy with their work by the departing Mamoulian. "Once we got used to Otto, we had a pretty easy time", Vincent Price recalled in a July 1989 interview. Filming was completed on June 29, slightly over budget, but within the projected timetable.

Zanuck was unhappy with Preminger's first cut of the film and insisted it be given a new ending, in which it was revealed Lydecker had imagined the entire story, but following a screening of the Zanuck version, columnist Walter Winchell approached the studio head and told him: "I didn't get [the ending]. You've got to change it." Having lost again, Zanuck relented and allowed Preminger to reinstate his original finale, telling him: "This is your success. I concede."

=== Music ===
Once the principal photography had been completed, Preminger hired David Raksin to score the film. The director wanted to use "Sophisticated Lady" by Duke Ellington for the main theme, but Raksin objected to the choice. Alfred Newman, music director for Fox, persuaded Preminger to give Raksin a weekend to compose an original tune. Furious, Preminger gave Raksin that weekend, but threatened him with dismissal in case he failed.

Inspired by a "Dear John" letter he received from his wife over the course of that weekend, Raksin composed the haunting theme, also titled "Laura", for which Johnny Mercer later wrote lyrics. It eventually became a jazz standard recorded by more than 400 artists, including Stan Kenton, Dick Haymes, Woody Herman, Nat King Cole, The Four Freshmen, Charlie Parker, Billy Eckstine, and Frank Sinatra. Spike Jones did a parody version of the song. Preminger was so pleased with Raksin's score that he not only did not dismiss Raksin, but also collaborated with him on four additional films.

=== Soundtrack ===
In 1993, Fox Records released a 27-minute suite of Raksin's score on an album paired with Bernard Herrmann's score for Jane Eyre.

In 2013, Kritzerland released the complete Raksin score, along with test demos and the suite from the original album as bonus tracks. Track listing:

1. "Main Title" (02:18)
2. "The Phonograph" (00:25)
3. "The Café" (04:06)
4. "Waldo Walks Away" (01:01)
5. "Theatre Lobby" (01:27)
6. "Night" (03:05)
7. "The Café/Waldo's Apartment" (04:14)
8. "Laura Leaves" (00:59)
9. "The Portrait" (03:23)
1. "Mark" (01:05)
2. "Apartment House" (01:21)
3. "Radio" (01:24)
4. "The Party" (03:41)
5. "Outside Waldo's Door" (01:27)
6. "Waldo" (04:30)
7. "End Title" (01:23)
8. "Laura Theme – Test Demos" (01:44)
9. "The Laura Suite – Theme and Variations" (27:20)

== Reception ==
=== Critical response ===
Thomas M. Pryor of The New York Times considered Laura "close to being a top-drawer mystery", but noted that Gene Tierney did not match with how Laura Hunt was portrayed in the book. According to Pryor, "Miss Tierney plays at being a brilliant and sophisticated advertising executive with the wild-eyed innocence of a college junior".

Variety said "The film's deceptively leisurely pace at the start, and its light, careless air, only heighten the suspense without the audience being conscious of the buildup. What they are aware of as they follow the story ... is the skill in the telling. Situations neatly dovetail and are always credible. Developments, surprising as they come, are logical. The dialog is honest, real and adult." In 2002, Roger Ebert of the Chicago Sun-Times wrote "All of [the] absurdities and improbabilities somehow do not diminish the film's appeal. They may even add to it". He attributed this to the casting, particularly of Waldo Lydecker.

Pauline Kael called it "Everybody's favorite chic murder mystery." Eddie Muller wrote: "Although it's little more than a succession of dialogue scenes, Laura mesmerizes, due, in no small measure, to a quick-witted script and the erotic tension pulsing beneath the high-gloss surfaces ... The film's eighty-eight minutes of elegant moodiness still beguiles viewers."

On the review aggregator website Rotten Tomatoes, the film holds an approval rating of 100% based on 60 reviews, with an average rating of 8.9/10. The website's critics consensus reads: "A psychologically complex portrait of obsession, Laura is also a deliciously well-crafted murder mystery."

=== Accolades ===
Award	Category	Nominee(s)	Result	Ref.
Academy Awards	Best Director	Otto Preminger	Nominated	
Academy Awards	Best Supporting Actor	Clifton Webb	Nominated	
Academy Awards	Best Screenplay	Jay Dratler, Samuel Hoffenstein, and Elizabeth Reinhardt	Nominated	
Academy Awards	Best Art Direction – Black-and-White	Art Direction: Lyle R. Wheeler and Leland Fuller; Interior Decoration: Thomas Little	Nominated	
Academy Awards	Best Cinematography – Black-and-White	Joseph LaShelle	Won	
National Film Preservation Board	National Film Registry		Inducted	
Online Film & Television Association Awards	Film Hall of Fame: Productions		Inducted	

- In 1999, Laura was selected for preservation in the United States National Film Registry by the Library of Congress as being "culturally, historically, or aesthetically significant".

==== American Film Institute ====
- AFI's 100 Years ... 100 Thrills – No. 73
- AFI's 100 Years of Film Scores – No. 7
- AFI's 10 Top 10 – No. 4 Mystery Film

== Home media ==
Magnetic Video released the film on home video. However, by 1992, the film had not been available on home video for almost a decade, although it was available on LaserDisc.

20th Century Fox Home Entertainment released the film on Region 1 DVD on March 15, 2005. It is in fullscreen format with audio tracks and subtitles in English and Spanish. Bonus tracks include commentaries by film historian Jeanine Basinger, composer David Raksin, and author Rudy Behlmer; a deleted scene; the original theatrical trailer; and Gene Tierney: A Shattered Portrait and Vincent Price: The Versatile Villain, two episodes from A&E Biography. In a deleted scene (1:06) with benefactor Webb, "... the beautiful Tierney was placed in a more feminine role model, and in the end it was decided to delete her for the cinema release of the film". The scene was restored on January 14, 2019, and presented as an "extended version" on DVD releases. The film became available on Blu-ray on February 5, 2012. Eureka Entertainment released the movie on Blu-ray in the United Kingdom on January 14, 2019. Four of the five radio adaptations were included as extras on the disc (with the 1950 episode of The Screen Guild Theater omitted).

== Adaptations ==
=== Radio ===
Laura was adapted as a radio play for two different episodes of Lux Radio Theater, the first starring Gene Tierney, Dana Andrews, and Vincent Price (February 5, 1945), and the second starring Gene Tierney and Victor Mature (February 1, 1954). It was also adapted for the May 30, 1948, broadcast of Ford Theatre with Virginia Gilmore and John Larkin. In addition, Laura was presented twice on The Screen Guild Theater (August 20, 1945, and February 23, 1950), both episodes starring Gene Tierney, Dana Andrews, and Clifton Webb.

=== Television ===
In 1955, the movie was remade as a presentation of the drama anthology series The 20th Century Fox Hour, starring Dana Wynter in the title role. Robert Stack played McPherson and George Sanders played Lydecker. The director was John Brahm and the script was written by Mel Dinelli.

Laura was also adapted for a television production produced by David Susskind, aired on January 24, 1968, starring Lee Radziwiłł in Gene Tierney's part. Sanders returned in Clifton Webb's role, and Stack in Dana Andrews's. The show was taped in London and the teleplay was written by Truman Capote. It was met with unanimous negative reactions, which was attributed to Radziwiłł's poor acting.

== Legacy ==
David Lynch's mystery series Twin Peaks borrows general plot elements and character names from Laura. Laura Palmer is a murder victim being investigated by a detective who reads her diary throughout his investigation.

An episode of Star Trek: The Next Generation titled "Aquiel" was likewise inspired by Laura. In one early draft of the murder mystery episode, the writers struggled with the fact that their initial solution for the mystery seemed too close to the plot of Basic Instinct. Producer Michael Piller suggested they instead look to Laura as a blueprint. The script was adjusted accordingly, featuring a character in a detective role falling in love with a supposed murder victim through her personal logs, only to discover that she was, in fact, alive.

The Carol Burnett Show spoofed the film in season 9 episode 15 with the skit "Flora". Carol played the Gene Tierney role.

== See also ==
- List of American films of 1944
- List of cult films
