= Laura (novel) =

Detective novel by Vera Caspary

- First edition
- Author: Vera Caspary
- Original title: Ring Twice for Laura (serial title)
- Language: English
- Genre: Mystery novel
- Publisher: Colliers, 1942 (serial); Houghton Mifflin, 1943 (book).
- Publication date: 1943
- Publication place: United States
- Pages: 237 (Houghton Mifflin edition)

Laura (1943) is a detective novel by Vera Caspary. It is her best known work, and was adapted into a popular film in 1944, with Gene Tierney in the title role.

== Publication history ==
Originally, Laura ran in Colliers from October to November 1942 as a seven-part serial titled Ring Twice for Laura. Houghton Mifflin republished Laura in book form the next year; afterwards, Caspary sold the film rights to Twentieth Century Fox, resulting in a 1944 hit movie starring Gene Tierney and Dana Andrews. In 1946, Caspary sold the story for a fourth time, this time co-writing a theatrical version with George Sklar.

Laura achieved an international readership and has been translated into German, Italian, Japanese and Dutch, and it was released as an Armed Services Edition for the American military during World War II. Since its original publication, the novel has been reissued many times. I Books released an edition in 2000, billing it as a "lost classic;" however, this edition is out of print. An edition from Feminist Press became available in 2006.

In 2015, it was included as part of the Library of America's Women Crime Writers omnibus collection.

== Plot introduction ==
Like Wilkie Collins' novel The Woman in White (1859), Laura is narrated in the first person by several alternating characters. These individual stories all revolve around the apparent murder of the title character, a successful New York advertiser killed in the doorway of her apartment with a shotgun blast that obliterated her face.

Detective Mark McPherson, assigned to the case, begins investigating the two men who were closest to Laura: her former lover, a narcissistic middle-aged writer named Waldo Lydecker, and her fiance, the philandering Shelby Carpenter. As he learns more about Laura, Mark – not the most sentimental of men – begins to fall in love with her memory. When Laura turns out to be very much alive, however, she becomes the prime suspect.

The novel has some autobiographical elements; Caspary, like Laura, was an independent woman who earned her living as an advertiser and who struggled to balance career and romance.

== Major characters ==
- Laura Hunt, a smart and beautiful New York advertiser whose career is thriving
- Mark McPherson, the young homicide detective assigned to the Laura Hunt (later the Diane Redfern) murder case
- Waldo Lydecker, an obese middle-aged writer with expensive tastes and Laura's former lover
- Shelby Carpenter, Laura's fiance, an undistinguished philanderer
- Diane Redfern, a struggling young model and the actual murder victim

== Discussion ==
Laura often is identified, controversially, as a noir novel, and the lead character as a femme fatale. Laura Hunt, true, is smart, independent, beautiful and desirable; she has discarded the effete Waldo Lydecker to marry Shelby Carpenter; the body of Shelby's lover is found in her apartment, wearing her clothes; and, when questioned, she answers evasively.

All these things throw suspicion on her; nonetheless, the plot's main tendency is to show that while circumstances have pushed Laura dangerously close to emotional chaos, she has more innate integrity than every other character in the novel, male or female: Laura's fiance, for example, is unfaithful to her even on the eve of their wedding, while her "best friend" Waldo uses insidious methods to drive her lovers away. Morally, Laura's only equal is Mark McPherson, the hardboiled detective who begins by investigating Laura's murder; then investigates Laura for murder; and finally becomes her true love and savior.

The falsely accused heroine, her rescue by her lover, and the happy ending arguably place Laura within the romantic suspense genre. What sets the novel apart is that Laura is not a helpless virgin: she has a successful career and a considerable sexual experience, but still emerges as sincere and lovable, with desire for domestic happiness so strong that she is prepared to marry an unsuitable man to fulfill them.
