= Bloodhound Mysteries =

Imprint of Duell, Sloan & Pearce

- Parent company: Duell, Sloan and Pearce
- Founded: 1940
- Defunct: 1953
- Country of origin: United States
- Headquarters location: New York City
- Fiction genres: Crime, mystery

The Bloodhound was an imprint of Duell, Sloan & Pearce for the publishing of its suspense, crime, and detective fiction novels.

In the same manner as other publishers of mystery novels such as Doubleday's The Crime Club, J. B. Lippincott & Co.'s Main Line Mysteries, Simon & Schuster's Inner Sanctum, and William Morrow and Company's Morrow Mysteries, Duell, Sloan and Pearce adopted the Bloodhound as a branding device to mark their house style and make future releases readily identifiable to readers. The imprint had its distinctive colophon of a Bloodhound medallion, stamped on each book's spine and title page.

The Bloodhound imprint began in March 1940 with the publication of The So Blue Marble, by Dorothy B. Hughes, and ceased publication in August 1952 with the release of The Davidian Report, also by Hughes. In the intervening 13 years, The Bloodhound Imprint published approximately 112 titles by 34 writers.

== Scope and character ==
Duell published an average of nine books per year under their Bloodhound Mysteries imprint. These included a variety of detective fiction sub-genres including suspense & psychological thrillers, locked room mysteries, police procedurals and hardboiled detective stories.

The Bloodhound imprint published new works by respected crime novelists in their prime, such as Elizabeth Sanxay Holding, Anthony Boucher, and Lawrence Blochman. Yet the editors and reviewers at Duell, led by Marie Rodell also specialised in detecting the talent in younger, unproven writers. The most notable example of this is Dorothy B. Hughes, who had only published two volumes of poetry before her first novel The So Blue Marble, launched both her career as a novelist and the Bloodhound imprint itself. Further examples include Lenore Glen Offord, Lewis Padgett, Veronica Parker Johns, and Sam Fuller, whose first crime novel, The Dark Page, was published by Duell in 1944 while he was still a corporal serving in the U.S. Army.

The number of female mystery writers who prospered at Duell is also noteworthy. While female authors accounted for only slightly more than one third of the total writers published at Duell under the Bloodhound imprint, their collective critical and commercial success and the additional novels that brought forth ultimately accounted for 48 percent of the books published under the Bloodhound label (excluding anthologies).

While The Bloodhound Mysteries imprint had remained at the vanguard of publishing original work by American mystery authors all throughout the 1940s, beginning in 1949 this decreased dramatically as Duell began instead acting as the U.S. publisher for recent works by well known British crime writers, including John Creasey (writing as Anthony Morton), James Hadley Chase, and Nicholas Bentley.

The final year of the Bloodhound imprint saw only three titles published. In 1951 a partnership was struck between Duell and Little, Brown and Company of Boston, to handle the manufacturing, and promotion of all Duell, Sloan and Pearce titles. Thus the final releases have 'Duell Sloan & Pearce / Little, Brown' added to the Bloodhound Colophon.

== Regional Murder Series ==
Beginning in 1944, Bloodhound Mysteries published New York Murders, the first in its regional murder anthology series. Each volume highlighted a series of true crime stories related to a specific American City, told by a selection of well known mystery writers familiar with the region. The regional murder series concluded with Vol 9 in 1948.

Vol. 1 New York Murders (1944) Ted Collins, Editor

Vol. 2 Chicago Murders (1945) Sewell Peaslee Wright, Editor

Vol. 3 Denver Murders (1946) Lee Casey, Editor.

Vol. 4 San Francisco Murders (1947) Joseph Henry Jackson, Editor.

Vol. 5 Los Angeles Murders (1947) Craig Rice, Editor

Vol. 6 Cleveland Murders (1947) Oliver Weld Bayer (Eleanor Bayer & Leo Bayer), Editor

Vol. 7 Charleston Murders (1947) Beatrice St. J. Ravenel, Editor

Vol. 8 Detroit Murders (1948) Alvin C. Hamer, Editor

Vol. 9 Boston Murders (1948) John N. Markis, Editor.

The project was spearheaded by Marie Rodell who received a special Edgar Award in 1949 acknowledging her work on the series as supervising editor.

== Notable authors ==
- Stephan Bandolier (Nathaniel Weyl)
- Nicholas Bentley
- Lawrence Blochman
- Francis Bonnamy (Audrey Boyers Walz)
- Allan R. Bosworth
- Allison Burks
- James Hadley Chase
- Lucy Cores
- Ferguson Findley (Charles Weiser Frey)
- Sam Fuller
- John Gearon (John Flagg)
- Eaton K. Goldthwaite
- Robin Grey (Elizabeth Gresham)
- James Gunn
- H. H. Holmes (Anthony Boucher)
- Dorothy B. Hughes
- Kathleen Moore Knight (as Alan Amos)
- Thorne Lee (Thornton Shiveley)
- Manning Long
- Floyd Mahannah
- Anthony Morton (John Creasey)
- Jeannette Covert Nolan
- William O'Farrell
- Lenore Glen Offord
- Lewis Padgett (Henry Kuttner and C.L. Moore)
- Herman Petersen
- Elisabeth Sanxay Holding
- Muriel Stafford
- Robert Terrall
- Lawrence Treat

== See also ==
- Bloodhound Mystery
- Detective fiction
