= In a Lonely Place (disambiguation) =

In a Lonely Place is a 1950 American film directed by Nicholas Ray.

"In a Lonely Place" may also refer to:

- In a Lonely Place (novel), a 1947 novel by Dorothy B. Hughes, and the basis for the film
- "In a Lonely Place" (song), a 1986 song by The Smithereens
- "In a Lonely Place", a 1981 song by New Order, and the B-side to the single "Ceremony"
- "In a Lonely Place" (Altered Carbon), a 2018 television episode
- "In a Lonely Place" (Dawson's Creek), a 2002 television episode
- "In a Lonely Place" (Shrinking), a 2024 television episode
- "Chapter Seven: In a Lonely Place", a 2017 episode of Riverdale
