= Dolores Hitchens =

American writer (1907–1973)

- Born: Julia Clara Catherine Maria Dolores Robins; December 25, 1907; San Antonio, Texas, U.S.
- Died: August 1, 1973 (aged 65); Orange County, California, U.S.
- Education: UCLA
- Occupation: Writer
- Spouses: Beverley S. Olsen (m. 1934–1940); Hubert A. Hitchens
- Children: 2
- Writing career
- Pen name: D. B. Olsen; Dolan Birkley; Noel Burke
- Years active: 1938–1973
- Notable works: Fool's Gold (1958); The Watcher (1959)

Julia Clara Catherine Maria Dolores Robins Norton Birk Olsen Hitchens (December 25, 1907 – August 1, 1973) better known as Dolores Hitchens, was an American mystery novelist who wrote prolifically from 1938 until her death in 1973. She also wrote as D. B. Olsen, a version of her first married name, and under the pseudonyms Dolan Birkley and Noel Burke.

Hitchens collaborated on five railroad mysteries—"police procedurals about a squad of railroad cops"—with her second husband, Bert Hitchens, a railroad detective. She also branched out into other genres including Western fiction. Many of her mystery novels centered on a character named Rachel Murdock.

Hitchens wrote Fool's Gold, the 1958 novel adapted by Jean-Luc Godard for his film Bande à part (1964). Her novel The Watcher was adapted for an episode of the TV series Thriller which aired November 1, 1960.

== Biography ==
Hitchens was born in Texas on December 25, 1907. She was the daughter of W.H. Robbins and Myrtle Statham, who married in Caldwell County, Texas in 1901. In 1910, Dolores (as Julia C. Robbins) and her apparently widowed mother were living with Dolores's paternal grandfather in San Antonio.

Sometime over the next decade, Dolores's mother married a second time, to an unknown Norton, but she was divorced by the time mother and daughter showed up in the 1920 census for Kern County, California.

Myrtle married a third time in 1922, to Oscar (a.k.a. Arthur) Carl Birk. The Birk family was living in Long Beach by 1930 and Dolores apparently assumed her stepfather's surname.

Hitchens married, in about 1934, Beverley S. Olsen, a radio operator on a merchant vessel, and their 1940 household included the widowed Myrtle Birk.

It is not known whether Dolores divorced Olsen or was widowed, but she apparently married Hubert A. Hitchens, a Railroad Police, by the early 1940s, as they had a child together in 1942.

Dolores died in Orange County, California on August 1, 1973, and Hubert died in Riverside County in 1979.

== Publications ==
=== As Dolores Hitchens ===
Jim Sader mysteries

1. Sleep with Strangers (Doubleday: (Note: "Published for The Crime Club by Doubleday.")The Crime Club, 1955); U.K. edition, London: Macdonald, 1956
2. Sleep with Slander (Doubleday CC, 1960); UK: London: T.V. Boardman & Co., 1961, American Bloodhound Mystery no. 345

Simon & Schuster issued trade paperback editions in 1989 (Sleep with Strangers, ISBN 0-671-65286-9; Sleep with Slander, ISBN 0-671-65285-0).

By Dolores and Bert Hitchens

- F.O.B. Murder (Doubleday CC, 1955); UK: 1957, American Bloodhound no. 154
- One-Way Ticket (Doubleday CC, 1956); UK: 1958, American Bloodhound no. 193
- End of Line (Doubleday CC, 1957); UK: 1958, American Bloodhound. no. 216
- The Man Who Followed Women (Doubleday CC, 1959); UK: 1960, American Bloodhound no. 332
- The Grudge (Doubleday, 1963); UK: 1964, American Bloodhound. no. 466

Standalone books

- Stairway to an Empty Room (Doubleday CC, 1951)
- Nets to Catch the Wind (Doubleday CC, 1952) — also Widows Won't Wait (NY: Dell Publishing, 1954)
- Terror Lurks in Darkness (Doubleday CC, 1953)
- Beat Back the Tide (Doubleday CC, 1954); UK: Macdonald, 1955 — abridged as The Fatal Flirt (NY: Joseph W. Ferman, Bestseller mystery no. 184)
- Fool's Gold (Doubleday CC, 1958); UK: 1958, American Bloodhound no. 234
- The Watcher (Doubleday, 1959); UK: 1959, American Bloodhound. no. 279
- Footsteps in the Night (Doubleday CC, 1961); UK: 1961, American Bloodhound no. 366
- The Abductor (Simon & Schuster, 1962); UK: 1962, American Bloodhound no. 385
- The Bank with the Bamboo Door (Simon & Schuster, 1965); UK: 1965, American Bloodhound no. 504
- The Man Who Cried All the Way Home (Simon & Schuster, 1966); UK: London: Robert Hale, 1967
- Postscript to Nightmare (G. P. Putnam's Sons, 1967) ISBN 0-399-10647-2; UK title, Cabin of Fear (Michael Joseph, 1968)
- A Collection of Strangers (Putnam, 1969) ISBN 2-7201-0046-3; UK title, Collection of Strangers (Macdonald, 1970)
- The Baxter Letters (Putnam, 1971) ISBN 0-399-10073-3; UK: Hale, 1973
- In a House Unknown (Doubleday CC, 1973) ISBN 0-385-03265-X; UK: Hale, 1974

Plays

- A Cookie for Henry: one-act play for six women (NY: Samuel French, 1941), as Dolores Birk Hitchens

=== As D. B. Olsen ===
Rachel Murdock mysteries

1. Cat Saw Murder (Doubleday, 1939)
2. Alarm of Black Cat (Doubleday, 1942)
3. Catspaw for Murder (Doubleday, 1943); aka Cat's Claw
4. The Cat Wears a Noose (Doubleday, 1944)
5. Cats Don't Smile (Doubleday, 1945)
6. Cats Don't Need Coffins (Doubleday, 1946)
7. Cats Have Tall Shadows (Ziff-Davis Publishing Company, 1948)
8. The Cat Wears a Mask (Doubleday, 1949)
9. Death Wears Cat's Eyes (Doubleday, 1950)
10. Cat and Capricorn (Doubleday, 1951)
11. The Cat Walk (Doubleday, 1953)
12. Death Walks on Cat Feet (Doubleday, 1956)

Prof. A. Pennyfeather mysteries

1. Shroud for the Bride (Doubleday, 1945); aka Bring the Bride a Shroud
2. Gallows for the Groom (Doubleday, 1947)
3. Devious Design (Doubleday, 1948)
4. Something About Midnight (Doubleday, 1950)
5. Love Me in Death (Doubleday, 1951)
6. Enrollment Cancelled (Doubleday, 1952); aka Dead Babes in the Wood

Lt. Stephen Mayhew mysteries

1. The Clue in the Clay (New York: Phoenix Press, 1938) – her first book published under any name; also NY: Bartholomew House, 1946, A Bart House Mystery no. 35, ASIN B000HU0N64
2. Death Cuts a Silhouette (Doubleday, 1939)
3. The Ticking Heart (Doubleday, 1940)

=== As Dolan Birkley ===
- Blue Geranium (Bartholomew House, 1944)
- The Unloved (Doubleday, 1965)

=== As Noel Burke ===
- Shivering Bough (E. P. Dutton, 1942)
