= Bloodhound (disambiguation) =

The bloodhound is a dog breed.

Bloodhound may also refer to:

== Transport and military ==
- HMS Bloodhound, ships of the Royal Navy
- Bristol Type 84 Bloodhound, British fighter aircraft
- Bloodhound LSR, British jet vehicle project
- Bloodhound (missile)
- Bloodhound (yacht)

== Literature and entertainment ==
- Blood Hound (manga)
- Bloodhound, comic book series by Dan Jolley
- Bloodhounds, TV film directed by Michael Katleman
  - Bloodhounds II, TV film starring Corbin Bernsen
- Bloodhound (novel), by Tamora Pierce
- Bloodhound, novel series by Virginia Lanier
- Bloodhound mysteries, a publishing imprint
- Bloodhound, Apex Legends character
- "Bloodhound" (song), song by Larry Bright, made famous by Tages
- "Bloodhound", 5 Seconds of Summer song from 5SOS5
- Bloodhounds (South Korean TV series)
- BloodHound Q50 (2004–2026), American drill rapper

== Other uses ==
- Bloodhound, software used in Norton AntiVirus
- Apache Bloodhound, open source issue tracking software
- Bloodhound Site, archaeological site in Louisiana, United States
- Bloodhound Tracker, former name of the Bionomia database of biological specimen records
- Bloodhound Mysteries, an American book publisher
- Bloodhound Books, an English book publisher of crime fiction

== See also ==
- The Bloodhound Gang (TV series)
- Bloodhound Gang, comedy rock band
- Bloodhound Mystery, Boardman Books novel series
- Bloodhounds of Broadway (disambiguation)
