= Ride the Pink Horse (novel) =

1946 novel by Dorothy B. Hughes

- Author: Dorothy B. Hughes
- Genre: Mystery
- Publisher: Duell, Sloan and Pearce
- Publication date: 1946
- Publication place: United States

Ride the Pink Horse is a 1946 novel by mystery writer Dorothy B. Hughes. Robert Montgomery directed and starred in a film noir of the same title in 1947.

== Plot ==
The story illustrated the efforts of Sailor confronting Douglass, a wealthy ex-senator, about the murder of the senator's wife. Sailor, growing up under Douglass’ wing, became a henchman of sorts, who often carried out Douglass’ dirty work. Sailor knew that it was the senator that ordered for his wife's murder, and since the death of the senator's wife, Douglass continuously paid off Sailor in order to keep him quiet, but now, Sailor is back for more money. Douglass, after retiring from the senate, is vacationing in Santa Fe, New Mexico, so Sailor decides to confront him there. Upon his arrival, he finds that there is a fiesta in town and with all the commotion, Sailor does not have a place to stay overnight. He is also greeted by the head of the homicide bureau in Chicago, McIntyre, who knows a lot about Douglass and his dirty past. Along his adventure, Sailor befriends a few locals, a man named Pancho and a young 14-year-old girl, who help him through his journey.

== Hughes's style ==
Hughes, a famous crime writer in the mid-twentieth century, wrote Ride the Pink Horse in 1946. The novel would later become one of her most popular published pieces, alongside the novels In a Lonely Place and The Expendable Man, among many others. Her works are renowned for their ability to capture the feelings of loneliness and darkness; they also showcase Hughes's ability to add suspense while maintaining pacing throughout her stories. The novel Ride the Pink Horse was written in the noir fiction style. It has many dark and mysterious characteristics.

== Book to film ==
This film adaptation was released a year after the novel's publication, on October 8, 1947, with slight changes to the characters. In the novel, a character named "Sailor" rather than Frank Hugo has managed to obtain a deferment from military service. The film makes many details, including those of the blackmail scheme, less sordid, and adopts different names and occupations for the principal non-Mexican characters. Although Gagin's first name is never mentioned in the film, the opening credits read: Robert Montgomery is Lucky Gagin.

Ride the Pink Horse would become Hughes’ second film, but her first based on her own story.

== Other adaptations ==
- A 1947 Lux Radio Theater adaptation featured Montgomery and Hendrix.
- In 1950 the story was adapted using the same title for Robert Montgomery Presents TV series.
- The film was remade as the 1964 TV movie The Hanged Man, directed by Don Siegel.
