= Manning Long =

American novelist

- Born: March 4, 1906; Chase City, Virginia, U.S.
- Died: September 27, 1972 (aged 66); Amherst, Virginia, U.S.
- Occupation: Writer

Manning Long (March 4, 1906 – September 27, 1972), was an American writer of detective fiction, known for the Liz Parrott mysteries.

== Early life ==
Manning Long was born in 1906 in Chase City, Virginia, to Dr. Charles Massie Long (b.1868 – d.1945) and Elizabeth Harrison Fletcher Long (b.1873 – d.1938). Very little is known of her early life and education. She lived in Washington D.C., then later New York and New Jersey, as she launched her career as a writer.

== Career ==
Manning's debut Novel Here's Blood in your Eye, was published by Duell, Sloan and Pearce in September 1941. In it, audiences were introduced to the character of Liz Parrott, a former Arkansas school teacher, who relocated to Brooklyn, found work as an artist's model, and inadvertently stumbled into a murder mystery involving characters in the Greenwich Village Art scene.

Throughout the 1940s, Long would write a total of seven Liz Parrott novels, all published by Duell, Sloan & Pearce under the Bloodhound Mysteries imprint.

Long's books were published abroad by Hammond & Hammond Co. of London, and translated for French audiences by Nicholson & Watson. In addition to her crime novels, Long contributed short stories to popular magazines such as Collier's. Her final work was a children's fantasy adventure novel "The Fog Boat" co authored with Lewis Coffin, and published in 1957.

== Liz Parrott character ==
When the reader first meets Louise "Liz" Boykin, she is living in Brooklyn Heights on a shoestring budget, trying to find her way in the world. She is headstrong, intuitive and slightly reckless. She has a caustic, southern wit and a salty tongue. Liz lives with her beloved cat, I Am, and later a husband, Gordon Parrott of the N.Y. District Attorney's Office. Now and then Gordon loosely implies the reason Liz keeps getting caught up with intrigue over and over again, is that she is somehow psychic. The books leave this possibility open ended. While Gordon is away during the War, Liz finds part-time work at a Circulating library Book Store, which they later purchase together. In her final adventure Liz courts danger and does her detective work while highly pregnant.

== Critical reception ==
Manning Long's books were positively received by The Saturday Review and The New Yorker, with critics singling out her writing style and characters wit and humour. Anthony Boucher repeatedly praised Long's work, once stating, "There are many mystery-mongers whom I highly esteem for various weighty reasons, but there are few indeed who are more sheer fun to read than the brusquely ironic Manning Long." In an EQMM column in 1948, Boucher called out Long's novel Savage Breast and George Bagby's In Cold Blood as the best humorous mystery novels of the year.

Today the Liz Parrott books, still garner praise and attention from reviewers and connoisseurs out-of-print detective fiction, including the Crime Writer and athonlogist Bill Pronzini.

Manning Long's novels appear to have achieved commercial success in their day. Of the many dozens of mystery writers working under the Bloodhound imprint, Long was published more frequently by Duell, Sloan and Pearce than any other, except Dorothy B. Hughes and Lawrence Treat.

== Later life and family ==
While living in New York, Manning Long met Peter Wentworth Williams. They married on May 22, 1944, and would return to her native Virginia in 1947, settling on a farm in the town of Amherst. Long died in Amherst, Virginia, in 1972 at the age of 66.

Her husband Peter Wentworth Williams (June 30, 1911 – May 31, 1970) studied at the Art Students League in New York City and worked as a ceramics designer/manufacturer. Notably, he designed the Edgar Allan Poe statuette used by the Mystery Writers of America since 1948 as the Edgar Award.

Manning long's extended family has deep roots in central Virginia. The family home in Appomattox, originally built in 1782 (purchased by the Long's in 1840), was destroyed by fire in 1897 and was later rebuilt. Known as Longacre, it is presently operated as a bed and breakfast.

In addition, Manning's father Dr. Charles Massie Long, Published an academic work, Virginia County Names: Two Hundred and Seventy Years of Virginia History, New York, The Neale Publishing Company, 1908.

== Selected works ==
- Here's Blood in Your Eye (1941)
- Vicious Circle (1942)
- False Alarm (1943)
- Bury the Hatchet (1944)
- Short Shrift (1946)
- Dull Thud (1947)
- Savage Breast (1948)
