= The Blackbirder =

1943 novel

- Author: Dorothy B. Hughes
- Language: English
- Genre: Thriller
- Publisher: Duell, Sloan and Pearce
- Publication date: 1943
- Publication place: United States
- Media type: Print

The Blackbirder is a 1943 mystery thriller novel by the American writer Dorothy B. Hughes. It was first published by Duell, Sloan and Pearce. It was one of several novels by Hughes set in the American Southwest.

== Synopsis ==
Shortly after meeting an old acquaintance in a German restaurant in Yorkville he is murdered in the street and Julie Guilles, a refugee from wartime France is forced to discard her adopted identity and flee New York. She heads across country to Santa Fe in New Mexico to seek out the organizer of a ring smuggling illegal aliens in and out of the United States. He is known as the blackbirder, a historic nickname for slave traders, who had brought people into the United States for very different purposes. Julie hopes he can smuggle her across the border into Mexico, and help secure release of her cousin from the internment camp the American government have placed him in. However she is trailed all the way by a young man claiming to be a wounded British RAF pilot, but who she suspects may either be working for the Nazis or American law enforcement interested in her connection to the murder in New York.

== Bibliography ==
- Glassman, Steve & O'Sullivan, Maurice J. Crime Fiction and Film in the Southwest: Bad Boys and Bad Girls in the Badlands. Popular Press, 2001.
- Server, Lee. Encyclopedia of Pulp Fiction Writers. Infobase Publishing, 2014.
- Reilly, John M. Twentieth Century Crime & Mystery Writers. Springer, 2015.
