= New Spaceways Comic Annual =

New Spaceways Comic Annual #1 (1954). Cover art by Denis McLoughlin

The New Spaceways Comic Annual was published in 1954 by London's Boardman Books under their Popular Press imprint. The Book is about 10.75 x 7.75 inches. hardcover, printed boards, 158 pages. Contents are a combination of comic book and illustrated text stories. Illustrated in four color and black and white. Denis McLoughlin, creative director for the series, based most of the spacemen, rockets, flying saucers, space creatures, robots, etc. on the toys then carried by Woolworth's. Woolworth's were the primary distributor of the Boardman annuals in the United Kingdom, Australia, New Zealand, Canada, and all over the former British Empire.

Some of the Pyro/Kleeware/Tudor Rose toys used as models for this annual include: X-300 Space Cruiser (silver - top front cover); X-300 Space Cruiser (landed - front cover foreground); Johillco Spacemen (front cover); and Tudor Rose Space Clipper (front cover bottom left inset).

== Contents ==
The comic contents include three British original stories by Denis McLoughlin and a third by an unknown artist. One McLoughlin story features hard boiled detective Roy Carson while the other has science fiction hero Swift Morgan. The story Swift Morgan and the Flying Saucers is a reprint from 1949. As such, it is a very early UFO story. The other comic content is reprinted (in color and black and white) from U.S. Quality Comics Group. Comic content includes:

- Zip O'Daly Rocket Ship Pilot (British original?)
- Swift Morgan and the Flying Saucers by Denis McLoughlin
- Eric Falcon - The Surrender of Eric Falcon
- Chop Chop by Matt Baker
- Plastic Man - Grandma Crookes by Jack Cole
- The Whip - Crimson Vengeance (origin) by Reed Crandall
- Doll Man - The Full Moon Monster
- Corsair Queen - King of Corpse Cay
- Swift Morgan and the Ancient Egyptians by Denis McLoughlin
- Roy Carson Strikes Again by Denis McLoughlin
- Arizona Raines Water Hogs Die Broke might be by Matt Baker

== Sources ==
- Gore, Matthew H. "Collector's Corner: Denis McLoughlin," Goldenage Treasury Volume One. AC Comics: Longwood, Florida, 2003. Unpaginated.
- Hertzberg, Francis. Denis McLoughlin: The Master of Light & Shade. Gryphon Books: Brooklyn, New York, 1995.
- Holland, Steve. "The Lancashire Cowboy and the Bloodhound: The Art of Denis McLoughlin," Paperback Parade #24 (June, 1991), 60-62.
- Holland, Steve. The Mushroom Jungle. Zeon Books: Dilton Marsh, England, 1993.
- Lesser, Thomas M. "The Boardman Hardcovers," Paperback Parade #38 (April, 1994), 21-44.
- Young, S. Mark, Steve Quinn, and Mike Richardson. Blast Off: Rockets, Robots, Ray Guns and Rarities from the Golden Age of Space Toys. Dark Horse Books: Milwaukie, Oregon, 2001.
