= The Bloodhound =

The Bloodhound may refer to:

- The Bloodhound (2020 film)
- The Bloodhound (1925 film)

== See also ==
- Bloodhound (disambiguation)
