= The Delicate Ape =

1944 novel

- 1946 edition
- Author: Dorothy B. Hughes
- Language: English
- Genre: Thriller
- Publisher: Duell, Sloan and Pearce
- Publication date: 1944
- Publication place: United States
- Media type: Print

The Delicate Ape is a 1944 mystery thriller novel by the American author Dorothy B. Hughes. It was first published by Duell, Sloan and Pearce. Although written while World War II was still being fought, Hughes sets her novel in a futuristic era twelve years after the end of the world war. It revolves around an upcoming peace conference in New York where the major powers debate withdrawing the occupying forces following the defeat of Nazi Germany a decade earlier.

== Bibliography ==
- Conrad, Peter. The Art of the City: Views and Versions of New York. Oxford University Press, 1984.
- Server, Lee. Encyclopedia of Pulp Fiction Writers. Infobase Publishing, 2014.
- Reilly, John M. Twentieth Century Crime & Mystery Writers. Springer, 2015.
- Willett, Ralph. The Naked City: Urban Crime Fiction in the USA. Manchester University Press, 1996.
