= The Bloodhound Gang (disambiguation) =

The Bloodhound Gang may refer to:

- The Bloodhound Gang (TV series), a segment on the PBS television show 3-2-1 Contact
- The Bloodhound Gang, an American alternative rock band founded in 1991 as a hip hop group and branched out into other genres, and took its name from the TV show segment

== See also ==
- Bloodhound (disambiguation)
