= Colin McLoughlin =

British freelance writer

Colin McLoughlin was a British freelance writer. With his brother Denis McLoughlin, Colin created the comic book characters Swift Morgan, Roy Carson, Buffalo Bill, Sam English, and other comic book characters in the 1940s-1950s for the London publishing house TV. Boardman, Ltd. (Boardman Books).

== Sources ==
- Gore, Matthew H. Collector's Corner: Denis McLoughlin, Goldenage Treasury Volume One. AC Comics: Longwood, Florida, 2003. Unpaginated.
