= The Bamboo Blonde (novel) =

1941 novel

- Author: Dorothy B. Hughes
- Language: English
- Series: Griselda Satterlee
- Genre: Mystery
- Publisher: Duell, Sloan and Pearce
- Publication date: 1941
- Publication place: United States
- Media type: Print
- Preceded by: The So Blue Marble

The Bamboo Blonde is a 1941 American mystery thriller novel by the American writer Dorothy B. Hughes. It was a sequel to the author's 1940 debut novel The So Blue Marble, with the setting shifted from New York City to the West Coast. It was written and set shortly before America's entry into World War II. It was first published by Duell, Sloan and Pearce.

== Synopsis ==
Hollywood art director Griselda Satterlee has recently remarried her ex-husband journalist Con, and the two are on their second honeymoon. At his urging they leave fashionable Malibu for Long Beach. On a visit to the nearby Bamboo Bar, Con abandons her and picks up an attractive blonde woman and they depart into the night. The following morning her dead body has been discovered. Suspicion inevitably falls on Con, but Grisela comes to realize that her husband may have returned to work for the secret intelligence agency Department X. A variety of other figures crop up including a Hollywood film director, a river journalist of Con's and the sinister Major Pembrooke, apparently a spy as well as a potential murderer.

== Bibliography ==
- Penzler, Otto & Ellroy, James (ed.) The Best American Noir of the Century Houghton Mifflin Harcourt, 2011.
- Server, Lee. Encyclopedia of Pulp Fiction Writers. Infobase Publishing, 2014.
- Reilly, John M. Twentieth Century Crime & Mystery Writers. Springer, 2015.
