= Danièle Girard =

Danièle Girard is the name of

- Gabrielle Danièle Marguerite Andrée Girard (1926–2015), a French actress better known by her stage name Danièle Delorme
- Danièle Girard, an actress known from Bande à part
