= Dread Journey =

1945 novel

- Author: Dorothy B. Hughes
- Language: English
- Genre: Thriller
- Publisher: Duell, Sloan and Pearce
- Publication date: 1945
- Publication place: United States
- Media type: Print

Dread Journey is a 1945 mystery thriller novel by the American writer Dorothy B. Hughes, noted for her hardboiled style. It was first published by Duell, Sloan and Pearce.

== Synopsis ==
The story focuses on a group of passengers aboard The Chief running from Los Angeles to Chicago, where they plan to catch the onward 20th Century to the East Coast. They include the powerful Hollywood film mogul Vivien Spender as well as his leading star Kitten Agnew, a cynical bandleader, an alcoholic newspaperman as well as Gratia, the innocent, former librarian who Spender has chosen to replace Kitten. However, Kitten refuses to be abandoned the way Spender has dumped countless earlier protegees and has incriminating information against him.

She becomes increasingly fearful of Spender, who behind his urbane facade, is ruthless enough to kill her to get rid of her. As the train passes through Kansas, Kitten is discovered dead in her compartment. The other passengers decide to stand up to Spender and expose him as the murderer of both Kitten and his first wife. Rather than let this happen, Spender's ever loyal secretary chooses to take matters into her own hands.

== Bibliography ==
- Reilly, John M. Twentieth Century Crime & Mystery Writers. Springer, 2015.
- Server, Lee. Encyclopedia of Pulp Fiction Writers. Infobase Publishing, 2014.
- Slide, Anthony. The Hollywood Novel: A Critical Guide to Over 1200 Works with Film-related Themes Or Characters, 1912 Through 1994. McFarland & Company, 1995.
