= The Hanged Man (1964 film) =

- Italian poster
- Genre: Crime Drama
- Based on: Ride the Pink Horse by Dorothy B. Hughes
- Written by: Jack Laird; Stanford Whitmore
- Directed by: Donald Siegel
- Starring: Robert Culp; Edmond O'Brien; Vera Miles; Norman Fell; Seymour Cassel; Stan Getz; Archie Moore
- Music by: Benny Carter; Stanley Wilson
- Country of origin: United States
- Original language: English

Production
- Producer: Raymond Wagner
- Cinematography: Bud Thackery
- Editor: Richard Belding
- Running time: 87 minutes
- Production company: Revue Studios

Original release
- Network: NBC
- Release: November 18, 1964

The Hanged Man is a 1964 American made-for-television crime drama film directed by Don Siegel, in which a gunman seeks to avenge the death of his friend, who he believes was murdered. It is considered the second television film in broadcast history. It debuted on NBC on November 18, 1964.

The story is based on Ride the Pink Horse, a 1947 film based on a novel by Dorothy B. Hughes.

== Plot ==
When a gunman's best friend is murdered he sets out to find the killers and ends up concocting a scheme to blackmail a corrupt leader of a labor union who's to blame.

== Cast ==
- Robert Culp as Harry Pace
- Edmond O'Brien as Arnie Seeger
- Vera Miles as Lois Seeger
- Norman Fell as Gaylord Grebb
- Gene Raymond as Whitey Devlin
- J. Carrol Naish as Uncle Picaud
- Pat Buttram as Otis Honeywell
- Brenda Scott as Celine
- Edgar Bergen as Hotel Clerk
- Al Lettieri as Al
- Seymour Cassel as Bellboy
- Stan Getz as Himself
- Astrud Gilberto as Herself
- Archie Moore as Xavier
