= HMS Bloodhound =

Four ships of the Royal Navy have borne the name HMS Bloodhound, after the bloodhound, a breed of dog. A fifth was planned but renamed before being launched.

- HMS Bloodhound (1801) was a 12-gun gun-brig launched in 1801 and sold in 1816.
- HMS Bloodhound (1845) was an iron paddle vessel launched in 1845 and broken up in 1866.
- HMS Bloodhound (1871) was an Ant-class gunboat launched in 1871. She became a tender in 1905, a boom defence vessel in 1917, and was sold in 1921.
- HMS Bloodhound (1937) was a motor torpedo boat used for torpedo trials, launched in 1937 and wrecked in 1943.
- HMS Bloodhound was to have been a Type 22 frigate. She was renamed HMS London before being launched in 1984.
