= Ride the Pink Horse =

1947 film by Robert Montgomery

- Theatrical release poster
- Directed by: Robert Montgomery
- Screenplay by: Ben Hecht; Charles Lederer
- Based on: Ride the Pink Horse by Dorothy B. Hughes
- Produced by: Joan Harrison
- Starring: Robert Montgomery
- Cinematography: Russell Metty
- Edited by: Ralph Dawson
- Music by: Frank Skinner
- Production company: Universal Pictures
- Distributed by: Universal Pictures
- Release date: October 8, 1947 (United States)
- Running time: 101 minutes
- Country: United States
- Language: English

Ride the Pink Horse is a 1947 film noir crime film produced by Universal Studios. It was directed by Robert Montgomery, who also stars in it, from a screenplay by Ben Hecht and Charles Lederer, which was based on the 1946 novel of the same title by Dorothy B. Hughes. Thomas Gomez was nominated for a Best Supporting Actor Oscar for his performance.

An army veteran known only as Gagin travels to San Pablo in New Mexico to avenge the death of his wartime buddy. Some of the villagers refer to Gagin as "the man with no place."

== Plot ==
Lucky Gagin arrives in San Pablo, a rural town in New Mexico, during fiesta. He plans to blackmail a mobster named Frank Hugo as retribution for the death of his best friend Shorty. He places a check incriminating Hugo in a locker and hides the key behind a framed map in the bus depot waiting room. Because of the fiesta, Gagin cannot find a room at the nearby hotel. Going to the non-tourist side of the town, he meets Pila, who takes him to the La Fonda Hotel and gives him a charm that she says will protect him.

Going to Hugo's hotel room, Gagin knocks out Jonathan, Hugo's private secretary. Marjorie Lundeen, Hugo's sophisticated female acquaintance, tries to find out more about Gagin, who learns Hugo will not be there that day. In the hotel lobby, Gagin is accosted by FBI agent Bill Retz. Retz takes Gagin to lunch and tells Gagin to lay off with his plot for revenge on Frank Hugo.

Still looking for a room, Gagin visits the Cantina de las Tres Violetas, where Pila is sitting outside. Going into the bar, Gagin finds himself to be the only non-Hispanic. He buys a drink and pays for it with a twenty dollar bill. The barkeep can't make change but the situation is resolved by Pancho, who proposes that Gagin buy ten dollars' worth of drinks for everyone in the bar.

Gagin accompanies Pancho back to his tiovivo where Pancho puts him up for the night. Pila arrives at the merry-go-round and ends up sleeping in one of the seats on the carousel. Retz also and tells him if he could readily find Gagin, so will the toughs.

The next morning, Gagin returns to the La Fonda where he meets Frank Hugo, who wears a hearing aid. Gagin tells Hugo of the incriminating check. They agree to meet that evening at the Tip Top Cafe, where Hugo will pay Gagin the thirty thousand dollars for the check.

Retz "officially" asks Gagin for the evidence, which Gagin refuses to hand over. Gagin takes Pila to lunch but they are interrupted by the arrival of Marjorie Lundeen. She proposes a scheme to shake down Frank Hugo for even more money, but Gagin does not go along with Marjorie's plan.

After lunch, Gagin returns to the bus depot where he retrieves the check and follows the fiesta crowd to the Tip Top Cafe. He meets with Hugo, who tells Gagin the bank messenger with the money will be late. Marjorie invites Gagin to dance with her. To avoid being seen by Hugo, they go outside to a dark alley. where she tells Gagin there is no messenger. Two toughs jump Gagin, one of them stabbing Gagin in the shoulder with a knife. Retz finds the two toughs in the alley, one dead and one with a broken arm, and confronts Hugo at the dining table. Pila finds Gagin in the bushes, pulls the knife out of his back, and together they make their way back to Pancho and the merry-go-round.

Two more toughs come to the tiovivo. With Gagin hidden in one of the seats and children riding the carousel, the toughs severely beat Pancho, who does not betray Gagin. Gagin, suffering from his wound, agrees to go with Pila back by bus to her village of San Melo. He gives the check to Pila. They are found by Locke and Marjorie Lundeen. When Locke approaches the now passed out Gagin, Pila hits him with a bottle and they make their escape, leaving Marjorie to find Locke lying on the floor of the cantina.

Gagin returns to the La Fonda Hotel, where Pila finds him outside Hugo's room. One of Hugo's toughs brings them into the room, where Frank Hugo, Marjorie Lundeen, and Jonathan. Hugo begins to question the now incoherent Gagin, who does not remember where the check is. He is beaten by one of the toughs, who also beat Pila. Retz arrives, disarms the toughs, breaks Hugo's hearing aid, and ultimately gets the check from Gagin.

At breakfast the next day with Retz, Gagin refuses to eat. Retz tells Gagin he should say goodbye to Pila and Pancho, and together they return to the merry go round. Gagin bids adios to Pancho, and then, uncomfortably, to Pila, to whom he returns the charm. As Retz and Gagin leave, Pila is surrounded by them. She recounts the story of her adventure and delights in being the center of attention among her group.

== Cast ==
- Robert Montgomery as Gagin
- Thomas Gomez as Pancho
- Rita Conde as Carla
- Iris Flores as Maria
- Wanda Hendrix as Pila
- Grandon Rhodes as Mr. Edison
- Tito Rebaldo as Bellboy
- Richard Gaines as Jonathan
- Andrea King as Marjorie
- Art Smith as Bill Retz
- Martin Garralaga as Barkeeper
- Edward Earle as Locke
- Harold Goodwin as Red
- Maria Cortez as Elevator Girl
- Fred Clark as Hugo

== Ride the Pink Horse and the noir genre ==
A common theme in noir films is the post-war disillusionment experienced by many soldiers returning to the peacetime economy, which was mirrored in the sordidness of the urban crime film. In these films a serviceman, returns to find his sweetheart unfaithful or a good friend dead. The war continues, but now the antagonism turns with a new viciousness toward American society itself. In Ride the Pink Horse, Gagin's quest to avenge his friend's death leads him to rural New Mexico, an unusual setting for the noir motif more typically associated with corrupt urban environments.

== Production notes ==
The antique "Tio Vivo Carousel" built in 1882 in Taos, New Mexico, was the model for the carousel in the novel Ride The Pink Horse. It was purchased by the producers and shipped to the set of Universal where it was reconstructed for use in the film. The burning of the Zozobra ("Old Man Gloom") effigy during the Fiestas de Santa Fe sets the time of the events in the film in early September. Part of the movie was filmed at the La Fonda Hotel in Santa Fe.

=== Other adaptations ===
- In 1947 Lux Radio Theater adapted the film with Montgomery, Hendrix, and Gomez all reprising their roles. It is available at the Internet Archive.
- In 1950 the story was adapted using the same title for Robert Montgomery Presents TV series.
- The film was remade as the 1964 TV movie The Hanged Man, directed by Don Siegel.

== Reception ==
According to Variety, the film earned less than $2 million at the box office.

Bosley Crowther, film critic for The New York Times, liked the film, especially Robert Montgomery's direction, and wrote:

Mr. Montgomery, as director and star of this story, has contrived to make it look shockingly literal and keep it moving at an unrelenting pace. And he has also managed to lace it with grisly action and rugged sentiment without deceit. Indeed, he has artfully fashioned a fascinating film within the genre. He has done something else exceptional; he has given the other actors a real chance.

Crowther also praised the work of Fred Clark and Wanda Hendrix.

In The Nation in 1947, critic James Agee stated, "Ride the Pink Horse is practically revolutionary for a West Coast picture; it obviously intends to show that Mexicans and Indians are capable of great courage and loyalty, even to a white American ... Whether it is dread of libel suits, the so-called international so-called style, or plain blind habit, few American films ever manage really to specify a character or a situation so that either can achieve personal life or general applicability; people merely dance their way, more or less ingratiatingly, through a sequence of windy generalizations. They are not by any fat chance intended to be confused with any persons living or dead or who might ever possibly have lived."

Pauline Kael called it a "baroque folly" and wrote: "One of a kind; no one in his right mind would imitate it ... Wanda Hendrix, in dark makeup, gets a ride on a merry-go-round, thus giving the film its inappropriate title. But nothing else would have been appropriate either." Leslie Halliwell gave it one of four stars: "Dour, complex melodrama with a certain amount of style but not enough substance." Leonard Maltin was enthusiastic: "Strong film noir ... Taut script ... super performance by Gomez as friendly carny." Eddie Muller of the Film Noir Foundation wrote: "Ride the Pink Horse is a picaresque revenge thriller as well as a despairing take on the sprawl of American corruption ... The movie has an off-kilter energy and enough trapdoors and funhouse mirrors to make it unique. Although he'd have been wise to cast someone with more gravitas as Gagin, Ride the Pink Horse is unquestionably Montgomery's finest work as a director."

=== Awards ===
Nominations

- Academy Awards: Oscar; Best Actor in a Supporting Role, Thomas Gomez; 1948.
