= Roy Carson =

Roy Carson is a British hard-boiled detective created in 1948 by Denis McLoughlin and his brother Colin and first published by Boardman Books in their series of rotogravure comic books (1948–1954). Roy, with his plucky girl companion Silk, faced all manner of underworld adventures with an odd combination of American and British elements. Boardman Books also used Roy Carson in text stories published in their children's annuals in the 1950s. In the late-1950s and early 1960s, Roy Carson stories were reprinted in a number of British albums and annuals. In 1999, the comic fanzine Best of British #1 reprinted Roy Carson and the Old Master, originally published in 1953.

== Sources ==
- Gore, Matthew H. "Collector's Corner: Denis McLoughlin," Goldenage Treasury Volume One. AC Comics: Longwood, Florida, 2003. Unpaginated.
- Hertzberg, Francis. Denis McLoughlin: The Master of Light & Shade. Gryphon Books: Brooklyn, New York, 1995.
- Holland, Steve. "The Lancashire Cowboy and the Bloodhound: The Art of Denis McLoughlin," Paperback Parade #24 (June, 1991), 60–62.
- Holland, Steve. The Mushroom Jungle. Zeon Books: Dilton Marsh, England, 1993.
- Lesser, Thomas M. "The Boardman Hardcovers," Paperback Parade #38 (April, 1994), 21–44.
