= The So Blue Marble =

1940 novel

- Author: Dorothy B. Hughes
- Language: English
- Series: Griselda Satterlee
- Genre: Mystery
- Publisher: Duell, Sloan and Pearce
- Publication date: 1940
- Publication place: United States
- Media type: Print
- Followed by: The Bamboo Blonde

The So Blue Marble is a 1940 mystery thriller novel by the American writer Dorothy B. Hughes. It was her first published novel. The manuscript was trimmed by 25,000 words at the demand of the book's editor, establishing the author's terse, hard-boiled style. It received excellent reviews. It was followed by a sequel The Bamboo Blonde in 1941.

== Synopsis ==
Griselda Satterlee is staying alone at the New York apartment of her ex-husband Con. One night she is accosted by two handsome, well-bred but ruthless twins recently arrived from Europe. They turn out to have Missy, Griselda's much younger sister, who she hasn't seen for many years, in tow. Missy and the twins are chasing after a priceless blue marble. They insists that Griselda has it, and are prepared to commit multiple murders to get their hands on it.

== Bibliography ==
- Penzler, Otto & Ellroy, James (ed.) The Best American Noir of the Century Houghton Mifflin Harcourt, 2011.
- Server, Lee. Encyclopedia of Pulp Fiction Writers. Infobase Publishing, 2014.
- Reilly, John M. Twentieth Century Crime & Mystery Writers. Springer, 2015.
- Tuska, Jon. A Variable Harvest: Essays and Reviews of Film and Literature. McFarland & Company, 1990.
