= Marie Rodell =

American novelist

Marie Freid Rodell (January 31, 1912 – November 9, 1975) was a literary agent and author who managed the publications of much of environmentalist Rachel Carson's writings, as well as the first book by civil rights activist Martin Luther King Jr.

Rodell was born in New York City, and attended Vassar College (A.B. 1932). When Duell, Sloan, & Pearce was formed in December 1939, Rodell was one of their first hires and would spend the next nine years as the editor for mystery novel imprint, The Bloodhound. Rodell left Duell, Sloan & Pearce to form her own literary agency in 1948. That year she met Rachel Carson, who hired her. She worked with Carson for the remainder of Carson's life, and after Carson's death in 1964 became her literary executor; she compiled and organized the Rachel Carson Papers (which took over two years) and arranged for the posthumous publication of A Sense of Wonder. In 1957, she was King's literary agent for Stride Toward Freedom.

Rodell wrote three mystery novels under the pen name Marion Randolph. She was also a member of Mensa.

Rodell wrote Mystery Fiction: Theory and Technique; in his column of November 7, 1943, Chicago Tribune book columnist Vincent Starrett called this “one of the most entertaining textbooks ever written.” She was the editor of the Regional Murder Series. She also wrote and published books under the pen name Marion Randolph.
