= Agnès Guillemot =

Agnès Guillemot, born Agnès Perché (3 December 1931 – 17 December 2005) was a French film editor, known for her collaboration with the Nouvelle Vague directors. She edited sixteen films for Jean-Luc Godard, including Contempt (1963), Bande à part (1964) and Alphaville (1965). She also edited films for Truffaut, Jean-Charles Tacchella, Catherine Breillat, Alfredo Arias (theatre producer) and several other women directors, including Nicole Garcia, Catherine Corsini, Francesca Comencini and Paula Delsol.

== Life ==
Agnès Perché was born on 3 December 1931 in Roubaix, Nord. She married film director Claude Guillemot.

She died on 17 December 2005 in Paris.
