= The Davidian Report =

1952 novel

- Author: Dorothy B. Hughes
- Language: English
- Genre: Thriller
- Publisher: Duell, Sloan and Pearce
- Publication date: 1952
- Publication place: United States
- Media type: Print

The Davidian Report is a 1952 spy thriller novel by the American writer Dorothy B. Hughes. It was first published by Duell, Sloan and Pearce.

While many of her previous works had been set during World War II, this shifted the focus to the early Cold War. It was her penultimate novel, followed after an eleven-year gap by The Expendable Man in 1963.

== Synopsis ==
Steve Wintress heads to Los Angeles from East Berlin on the orders of his Communist paymasters. He is to buy back a secret report held by Davidian, a defector to the west. The report contains the entire Soviet plan to take over Western Europe. Wintress arrives to find that his contact has been murdered, Davidian has gone to ground somewhere in Los Angeles, while he now apparently has the FBI on his trail.

Wintress' attempts to track the missing Davidian are both helped and hindered by his local Communist allies. He is now suspicious of everybody he encounters, including an amiable soldier and an aspiring dancer, niece of a prominent Hollywood film director. Amongst them is Janni, his former lover in Prague, who alone seems to know the whereabouts of Davidian.
