= Bande à part (film) =

1964 film by Jean-Luc Godard

- Theatrical release poster
- Directed by: Jean-Luc Godard
- Screenplay by: Jean-Luc Godard (uncredited)
- Based on: Fools' Gold; 1958 novel by Dolores Hitchens
- Starring: Anna Karina; Sami Frey; Claude Brasseur
- Narrated by: Jean-Luc Godard
- Cinematography: Raoul Coutard
- Edited by: Agnès Guillemot; Françoise Collin; Dahlia Ezove
- Music by: Michel Legrand
- Production companies: Anouchka Films; Orsay Films
- Distributed by: Columbia Pictures
- Release date: 5 August 1964
- Running time: 97 minutes
- Country: France
- Language: French
- Budget: $120,000 (estimated)

Bande à part (French pronunciation: [bɑ̃d a paʁ]) is a 1964 French New Wave film directed by Jean-Luc Godard. It was released as Band of Outsiders in North America; its French title derives from the phrase faire bande à part, which means "to do something apart from the group". The film is about three people who commit a robbery. It received positive critical reviews, and its dance scene has been referenced several times in popular culture.

== Plot ==
A young woman named Odile (Anna Karina) meets a man named Franz (Sami Frey) in an English language class. She has told him of a large pile of money stashed in the villa where she lives with her aunt Victoria and Mr. Stolz in Joinville, a Parisian suburb. Franz tells his friend Arthur (Claude Brasseur) of the money and the two make a plan to steal it.

Franz and Arthur go to the English class, where Arthur flirts with Odile and asks her about the money. Odile goes home and finds the money in Stolz's room. She then meets Franz and Arthur, and they go to a café, order drinks, and dance. Odile tells Arthur that she loves him, and the two go back to his place and spend the night together.

The next day, Arthur's uncle learns of the money and wants a cut of it. Franz, Arthur, and Odile decide to commit the robbery sooner than they planned. The three meet up and run through the Louvre in record time. That night, they go to Odile's house and find that the door to Stolz's room is locked. Arthur tells Odile to find the key. Franz and Arthur return to the house the following night, and Odile tells them that the locks have been changed. They tie and gag Victoria, before locking her in a closet. Then, they go to Stolz's room and see that the money is not there anymore. They search the house and find only a small amount of cash. When they open the closet to interrogate Victoria, she appears to be dead. Franz and Odile leave, and Arthur stays behind, saying he wants to check if Victoria is really dead (but we infer he is going back to find the rest of the money).

While driving away, Franz and Odile see Arthur's uncle heading to the villa, and they go back. They then see that Arthur has found the rest of the money in a kennel. Arthur and his uncle get into a shootout and kill each other. Stolz returns to the house and Victoria is shown to be alive. Franz and Odile drive off with the small stack of money from the robbery. They flee to South America and resign themselves to their shared fate.

== Cast ==
- Anna Karina as Odile
- Sami Frey as Franz
- Claude Brasseur as Arthur
- Danièle Girard as English teacher
- Louisa Colpeyn as Madame Victoria
- Ernest Menzer as Arthur's uncle
- Chantal Darget as Arthur's aunt
- Georges Staquet as legionnaire

== Production ==
Bande à part was directed by Jean-Luc Godard and was filmed in 25 days. Godard described it as "Alice in Wonderland meets Franz Kafka". The film is an adaptation of the 1958 novel Fools' Gold by American author Dolores Hitchens.

== Reception ==
Bande à part has a 94% rating on Rotten Tomatoes based on 52 reviews, with an average rating of 7.98/10. The website's critical consensus calls the film "an oddball heist movie with an dark streak that picks apart every rule in filmmaking." Film critic Pauline Kael described Bande à part as "a reverie of a gangster movie" and "perhaps Godard's most delicately charming film". According to critic Ignatiy Vishnevetsky, the film's outward charm contrasts with how sad it is: "Band Of Outsiders contains some of the medium's most sublime images of the anything-goes possibility of youth, but it also captures the hopelessness and loneliness of being young with nothing to do. Whether they're planning a crime or performing an impromptu dance routine, the trio is mostly motivated by boredom, and everything carries a tinge of personal darkness."

Bande à part is often considered one of Godard's most accessible films; critic Amy Taubin called it "a Godard film for people who don't much care for Godard". Its accessibility has endeared the film to a broader audience. For example, it was the only Godard film selected for Time's "All-Time 100 movies". Bande à part was also ranked No. 79 in Empire magazine's "The 100 Best Films of World Cinema" in 2010.

In tribute, Quentin Tarantino named his film production company "A Band Apart". It was also Tarantino's favorite Godard film.

== Memorable scenes ==
(l. to r.) Arthur, Odile, and Franz turn to different positions as they dance what they called "the Madison dance".

When Franz, Arthur, and Odile are in a crowded café, Arthur and Odile decide to dance. Franz joins them as they perform a dance routine. The music is R&B or soul music composed for the film by Michel Legrand, but Anna Karina said the actors called it "the Madison dance", alluding to a novelty dance of the time. The Madison scene influenced the dance scene with Uma Thurman and John Travolta in Tarantino's Pulp Fiction (1994). It also influenced scenes in Hal Hartley's Simple Men (1992) and Martin Hynes' The Go-Getter (2007). In Roger Michell's Le Week-End (2013), the principal characters see the dance scene on a TV screen in their Paris hotel room and briefly dance along with it. The final scene of the movie is a longer reenactment in a café after one of the characters plays the music on a jukebox. In "The Gentlemen's Wager", a 2014 short film made to promote Johnnie Walker whiskey, Jude Law and a group of dancers perform the Madison dance in order to win a bet. Emma Stone, Jonah Hill, and Rome Kanda perform the dance in "Exactly Like You", the fifth episode of the 2018 Netflix series Maniac. The entire dance scene was also used as the music video for the song "Dance with Me" by Nouvelle Vague from their album Bande à Part (2006). The group took their name from a scene in the film, where Arthur and Odile are walking on a street and pass an emporium with Nouvelle Vague (New Wave or New Trend) in large letters over the door. Part of the dance scene was re-created on a spaceship in Carl Colpaert's Black Limousine, with Bijou Phillips and David Arquette.

In a later scene, Franz, Arthur, and Odile attempt to break the world record for running through the Louvre museum. The narrator informs viewers that their time was 9 minutes and 43 seconds, which broke the record set by Jimmy Johnson of San Francisco at 9 minutes and 45 seconds. The Louvre scene is referenced in Bernardo Bertolucci's 1968-based 2003 film The Dreamers, in which its characters break the Louvre record.

== See also ==
- Heist film
