= In a Lonely Place =

1950 film by Nicholas Ray

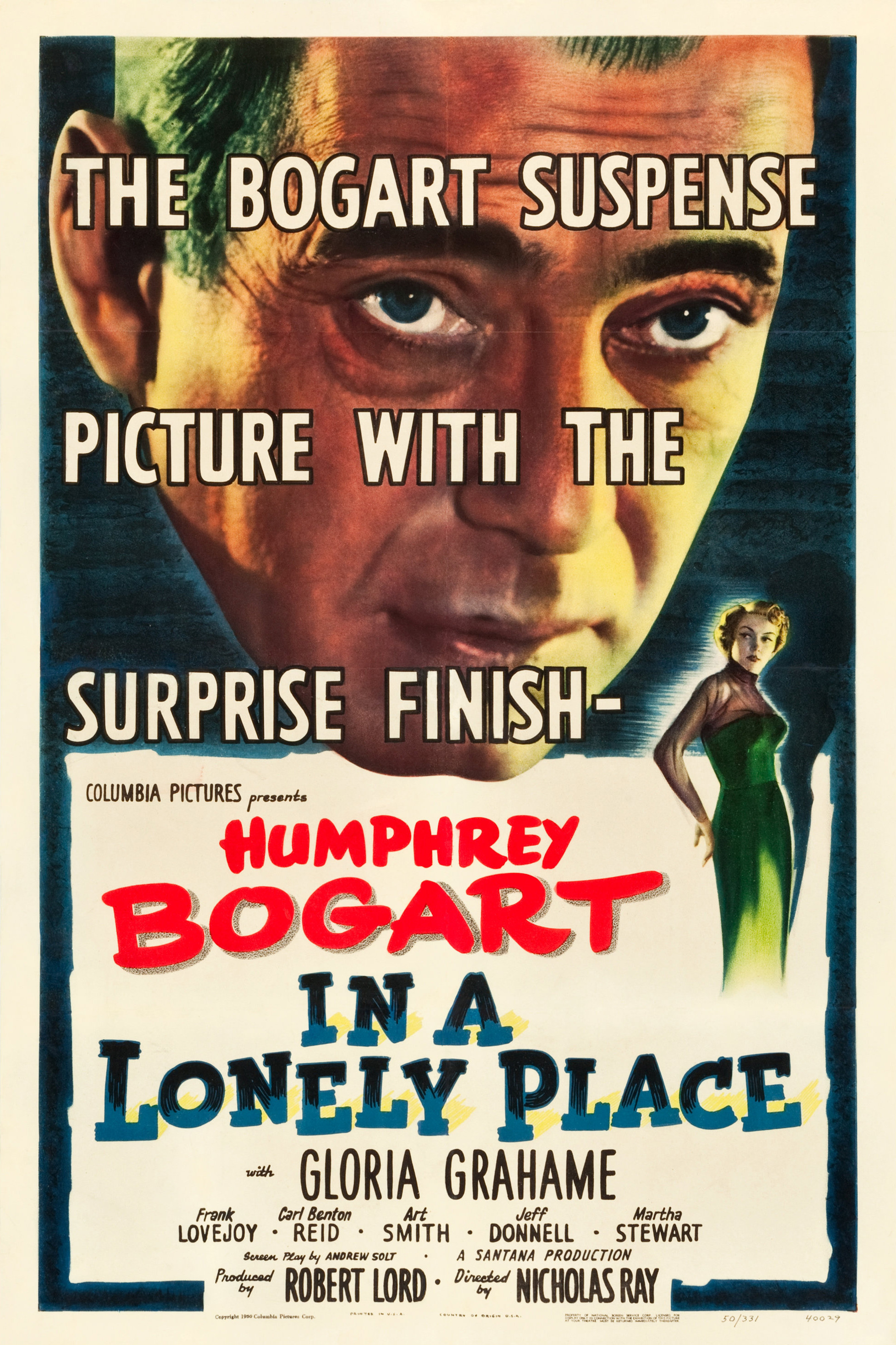
- Theatrical release poster
- Directed by: Nicholas Ray
- Screenplay by: Andrew P. Solt; Edmund H. North (adaptation)
- Based on: In a Lonely Place; 1947 novel by Dorothy B. Hughes
- Produced by: Robert Lord
- Starring: Humphrey Bogart; Gloria Grahame; Frank Lovejoy; Carl Benton Reid; Art Smith; Jeff Donnell; Martha Stewart
- Cinematography: Burnett Guffey
- Edited by: Viola Lawrence
- Music by: George Antheil
- Production company: Santana Pictures Corporation
- Distributed by: Columbia Pictures
- Release dates: May 17, 1950 (New York City, premiere)
- Running time: 94 minutes
- Country: United States
- Language: English
- Box office: $1.4 million

In a Lonely Place is a 1950 American film noir by director Nicholas Ray and starring Humphrey Bogart and Gloria Grahame, produced for Bogart's-own Santana Productions. The script was written by Andrew P. Solt from Edmund H. North's adaptation of Dorothy B. Hughes' 1947 novel of the same title.

Bogart stars as Dixon (Dix) Steele, a troubled, violence-prone screenwriter suspected of murder. Grahame co-stars as Laurel Gray, a lonely neighbor who falls under his spell. Beyond its surface plot of confused identity and tormented love, the story is a mordant comment on Hollywood mores and the pitfalls of celebrity and near-celebrity, similar to two other American films released that same year, Billy Wilder's Sunset Boulevard and the Best Picture-winner, Joseph L. Mankiewicz's All About Eve.

Although less famous than his other work, Bogart's performance is considered by many critics to be among his finest and the film's reputation has grown over time, along with Ray's. It is now considered one of the best films noir of all time, as evidenced by its inclusion on the Time "All-Time 100 Movies" list and Slant Magazine's "100 Essential Films", and it is ranked number one on Slant's "The 100 Best Film Noirs of All Time". The BBC ranked it number 89 in their list of the 100 greatest American films of all time. In 2007, In a Lonely Place was selected for preservation in the United States National Film Registry by the Library of Congress as being "culturally, historically, or aesthetically significant."

== Plot ==
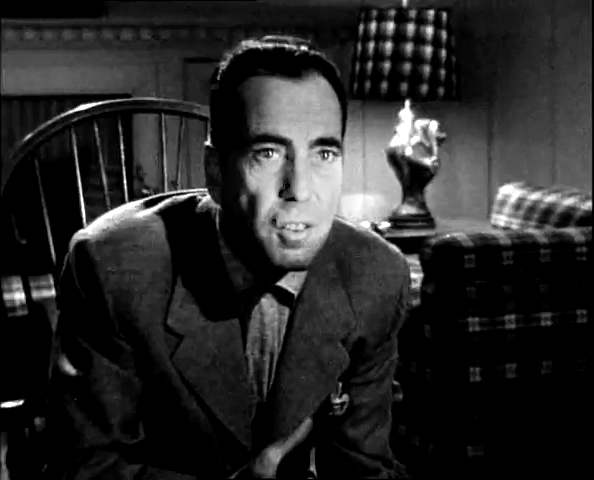
Bogart as Dixon Steele

Dixon "Dix" Steele, a down-on-his-luck Hollywood screenwriter with an explosive temper who has not had a successful movie since before World War II, is cajoled into adapting a book into a film after meeting his agent Mel Lippman at a nightclub. The hat-check girl, Mildred Atkinson, is engrossed in reading the copy meant for Dix. Dix takes her to his Beverly Hills apartment, where she explains the plot to him. Rather than drive her home as promised, he gives her cab fare instead.

The next morning, Dix is brought to the police station by his friend and police detective Brub Nicolai. Nicolai's superior Captain Lochner reveals that Mildred was murdered, and informs Dix that he is a suspect. Laurel Gray, an aspiring actress and a new neighbor of Dix's, confirms that she saw Mildred leaving Dix's apartment. Dix strikes up conversation with Laurel afterwards, and their mutual attraction becomes evident. They begin to fall in love and, with Laurel assisting him, Dix goes back to work with renewed enthusiasm, much to Mel's delight.

At a dinner with Nicolai and his wife, Sylvia, Dix has them re-enact the murder as he imagines it, unsettling Sylvia. Lochner, fixated on Dix's record of violent behavior, meets with Laurel again and sows seeds of doubt in her mind, which she later confides to Sylvia. She becomes more suspicious after learning about Dix's chequered romantic past. At a beach party with the Nicolais, Sylvia inadvertently reveals Laurel's follow-up meeting with Lochner, leading Dix to storm off. Laurel follows Dix into his car; he drives erratically and at speed until they sideswipe another car. When the other driver accosts him, Dix beats him unconscious and is about to strike him with a large rock when Laurel stops him.

Laurel's suspicions take a toll on her, and she becomes unable to sleep without taking pills. When he asks her to marry him, she accepts out of fear. Mel comes over to celebrate, only to find out that Laurel does not want to go through with the marriage and is making plans to escape to New York. She urges Mel to bring Dix's completed script to a producer. At a dinner celebrating the engagement, Dix is annoyed to learn that Mel has submitted his script without his consent. Dix then angrily intercepts a telephone call meant for Laurel at the table, slugging Mel when he tries to intervene.

Back at Laurel's apartment, Dix flies into a rage when he sees that she has removed her engagement ring. Learning of Laurel's intended flight to New York, he almost strangles her before regaining control of himself. Nicolai calls, informing the two that Mildred's boyfriend Henry Kesler has confessed to her murder, with Lochner apologizing for fixating on Dix. However, both Dix and Laurel realize that it is too late to salvage their relationship. Laurel watches in tears as Dix slowly walks away across the courtyard to his apartment.

== Cast ==
- Humphrey Bogart as Dixon Steele
- Gloria Grahame as Laurel Gray
- Frank Lovejoy as Det. Sgt. Brub Nicolai
- Carl Benton Reid as Captain Lochner
- Art Smith as Mel Lippman
- Martha Stewart as Mildred Atkinson
- Jeff Donnell as Sylvia Nicolai
- Robert Warwick as Charlie Waterman
- Morris Ankrum as Lloyd Barnes
- William Ching as Det. Ted Barton
- Steven Geray as Paul, the headwaiter
- Hadda Brooks as singer
- Jack Reynolds as Henry Kesler
- Ruth Gillette as Martha
- Billy Gray as the young boy requesting Steele's autograph (uncredited)

== Background ==
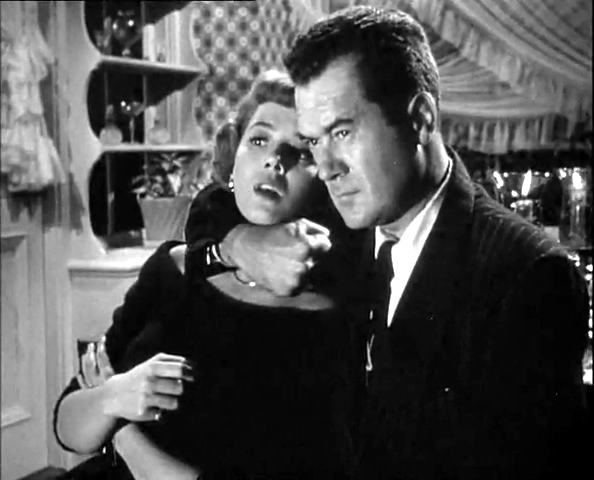
Brub (Frank Lovejoy) demonstrates on Sylvia a possible murder method

When Edmund H. North adapted the story, he stuck close to the original source and John Derek was considered for the role of Steele because in the novel the character was much younger. North's treatment was not used.

Andrew Solt developed the screenplay with regular input from producer Robert Lord and director Nicholas Ray, and the result is far different from the source novel. Solt claimed that Bogart loved the script so much that he wanted to make it without revisions – Solt maintains that the final cut is very close to his script – but further research shows that Ray made regular rewrites, some added on the day of shooting. In fact, only four pages of the 140-page script had no revisions. The film was produced by Bogart's Santana Productions company. The firm's first movie was Knock on Any Door (1949), which was also directed by Ray and starred Bogart and Derek in the leading roles.

Louise Brooks wrote in her essay "Humphrey and Bogey" that she felt it was the role of Dixon Steele in this movie that came closest to the real Bogart she knew.

Before inertia set in, he played one fascinatingly complex character, craftily directed by Nicholas Ray, in a film whose title perfectly defined Humphrey's own isolation among people. In a Lonely Place gave him a role that he could play with complexity because the character's pride in his art, his selfishness, his drunkenness, his lack of energy stabbed with lightning strokes of violence, were shared equally by the real Bogart.

The original ending had Steele strangling Gray to death in the heat of their argument. Sgt. Nicolai comes to tell Steele that he has been cleared of Mildred's murder but arrests him for killing Gray. Steele tells Brub that he is finally finished with his screenplay; the final shot was to be of a page in the typewriter which has the significant lines Steele said to Gray in the car (which he admitted to not knowing where to put) "I was born when she kissed me, I died when she left me, I lived a few weeks while she loved me". This scene was filmed halfway through the shooting schedule, but Ray hated the ending he had helped write. Ray later said,

"I just couldn't believe the ending that Bundy (screenwriter Andrew Solt) and I had written. I shot it because it was my obligation to do it. Then I kicked everybody off stage except Bogart, Art Smith and Gloria. And we improvised the ending as it is now. In the original ending we had ribbons so it was all tied up into a very neat package, with Lovejoy coming in and arresting him as he was writing the last lines, having killed Gloria. Huh! And I thought, shit, I can't do it, I just can't do it! Romances don't have to end that way. Marriages don't have to end that way, they don't have to end in violence. Let the audience make up its own mind what's going to happen to Bogie when he goes outside the apartment."

Bacall, Rosalind Russell, Vivien Leigh, Ingrid Bergman and Ginger Rogers were considered for the role of Laurel Gray. Bacall was a natural choice given her off-screen marriage to Bogart and their box-office appeal, but Warner Bros. refused to loan her out, a move often thought to be in reaction to Bogart having set up his own independent production company, the type of which Warner Bros. were afraid would jeopardize the future of the major studios. Rogers was the producers' first choice but Ray believed that his wife Gloria Grahame was right for the part. Even though their marriage was troubled, he insisted that she be cast. Her performance today is unanimously considered to be among her finest.

Grahame and Ray's marriage was starting to come apart during filming. Grahame was forced to sign a contract stipulating that "my husband [Ray] shall be entitled to direct, control, advise, instruct and even command my actions during the hours from 9 AM to 6 PM, every day except Sunday ... I acknowledge that in every conceivable situation his will and judgment shall be considered superior to mine and shall prevail." Grahame was also forbidden to "nag, cajole, tease or in any other feminine fashion seek to distract or influence him." The two did separate during filming. Afraid that one of them would be replaced, Ray took to sleeping in a dressing room, lying and saying that he needed to work on the script. Grahame played along with the charade and nobody knew that they had separated. Though there was a brief reconciliation, the couple divorced in 1952.

The film was one of two Nicholas Ray films to be scored by avant garde classical composer George Antheil (1900–1959). The production began on October 25, 1949, and ended on December 1, 1949.

== Reception ==
=== Critical response ===
At the time of its original release, the reviews were generally positive (in particular many critics praised Bogart and Grahame's performances), but many questioned the marketability given the bleak ending. The staff at Variety magazine in May 1950 gave the film a good review and wrote,

In In a Lonely Place Humphrey Bogart has a sympathetic role though cast as one always ready to mix it with his dukes. He favors the underdog; in one instance he virtually has a veteran, brandy-soaking character actor (out of work) on his very limited payroll ... Director Nicholas Ray maintains nice suspense. Bogart is excellent. Gloria Grahame, as his romance, also rates kudos.

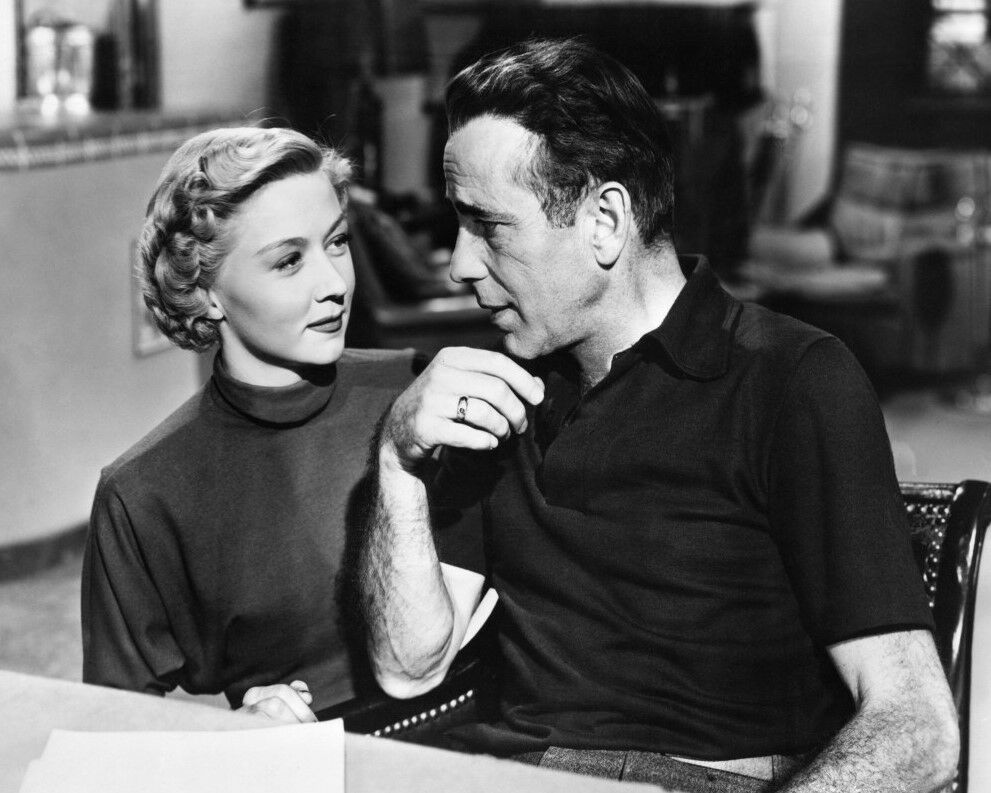
Gloria Grahame and Bogart

Bosley Crowther lauded the film, especially Bogart's performance and the screenplay, writing,

Everybody should be happy this morning. Humphrey Bogart is in top form in his latest independently made production, In a Lonely Place, and the picture itself is a superior cut of melodrama. Playing a violent, quick-tempered Hollywood movie writer suspected of murder, Mr. Bogart looms large on the screen of the Paramount Theatre and he moves flawlessly through a script which is almost as flinty as the actor himself. Andrew Solt, who fashioned the screenplay from a story by Dorothy B. Hughes and an adaptation by Edmund H. North, has had the good sense to resolve the story logically. Thus Dixon Steele remains as much of an enigma, an explosive, contradictory force at loose ends when the film ends as when it starts.

Not unlike Ray's debut They Live by Night (1948), it was advertised as a straight thriller although the film does not fit easily into one genre, as the marketing shows. Ray's films had a brief revival in the 1970s and Bogart's anti-hero stance gained a following in the 1960s, and the French Cahiers du cinéma critics during the 1950s praised Ray's unique film making. Time magazine, which gave the film a negative review upon its initial release, called it one of the 100 best films of all time in their 2005 list.

"One of Bogart's greatest charms is that he may have been the only actor in the world who could get away with lines like...'I was born when I met you. I lived while you loved me. I died when you left me.'...Only an actor with Bogart's terminal irreverence could break through banality to the other side of wild romanticism."

— Film historian Andrew Sarris.

Critic Ed Gonzalez wrote in 2001, "Not unlike Albert Camus' The Stranger, Nicholas Ray's remarkable In a Lonely Place represents the purest of existentialist primers ... Gray and Dixon may love each other but it's evident that they're both entirely too victimized by their own selves to sustain this kind of happiness. In the end, their love resembles a rehearsal for the next and hopefully less complicated romance. This is the existential endgame of one of Ray's smartest and most devastating masterpieces."

Curtis Hanson is featured on the retrospective documentary of the DVD release showing his admiration for the film, notably Ray's direction, the dark depiction of Hollywood and Bogart's performance. This was one of the films which he showed to actors Russell Crowe and Guy Pearce in preparation for filming L.A. Confidential. He said, "I wanted them to see the reality of that period and to see that emotion. This movie, and I'm not saying it's the greatest movie ever made, but it represents many things that I think are worth aspiring to, such as having character and emotion be the driving force, rather than the plot. ... When I first saw In a Lonely Place as a teenager, it frightened me and yet attracted me with an almost hypnotic power. Later, I came to understand why. Occasionally, very rarely, a movie feels so heartfelt, so emotional, so revealing that it seems as though both the actor and the director are standing naked before the audience. When that kind of marriage happens between actor and director, it's breathtaking."

In 2009, film critic Roger Ebert added In a Lonely Place to his "great movies" list. Eddie Muller listed it as one of his Top 25 Noir Films: "This incredible rethinking of Dorothy B. Hughes' disturbing serial killer novel is as close as a studio film ever got to 'personal filmmaking.' No noir iconography, just a profound darkness of the soul."

The review aggregator Rotten Tomatoes reported that 96% of critics gave the film positive reviews, with an average rating of 9/10, based on 52 reviews. Its website's critics consensus reads: "Led by extraordinary performances from Humphrey Bogart and Gloria Grahame, In a Lonely Place is a gripping noir of uncommon depth and maturity."

=== In popular culture ===
The 1986 song "In a Lonely Place" by the Smithereens, from the album Especially For You, was inspired by the film. Its chorus, "I was born the day I met you, lived a while when you loved me, died a little when we broke apart," is taken directly from the movie's dialogue.

In Season 2, Episode 1 of the TV show Frasier (1994), an author reads from his book lines echoing the film's: "I budded when you kissed me. I withered when you left me. I bloomed a few months while you loved me."

== Comparisons to novel ==
In a Lonely Place was based on the 1947 novel of the same name by Dorothy B. Hughes. Some controversy exists between admirers of the film and admirers of the novel (who view the film as a watered down adaptation), as Edmund H. North's script takes some elements of the novel but is ultimately a different story. Hughes was not bothered by the changes made by North and praised Grahame's performance as Gray.

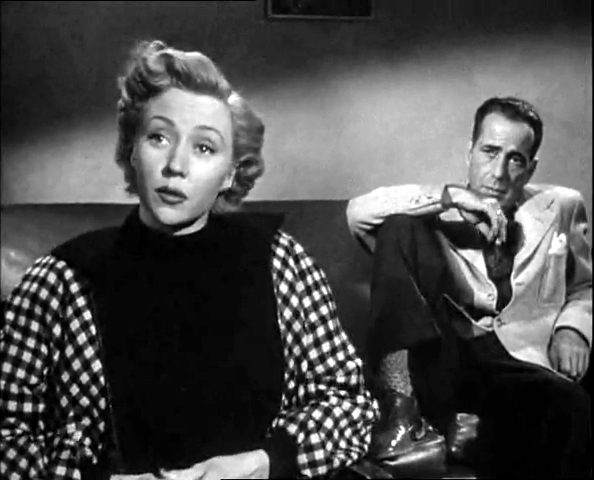
Gloria Grahame and Bogart, from the film's trailer

The strongest difference between the two works lies in the protagonist; the film's Dixon Steele is a screenwriter with an unconventional life and a decent person with fatally poor impulse control, prone to wild overreaction when enraged. The novel's Steele is a limited third-person view from Steele's perspective, reminiscent of the first-person in noir, à la The Killer Inside Me. Steele is a charlatan who pretends to be a novelist while sponging money from his overbearing uncle. While still receiving what he perceives as a small monthly allowance from his uncle, Steele murders a wealthy young man and assumes his identity, in a manner similar to Patricia Highsmith's later Tom Ripley. The film follows the question of whether Steele finally went too far in his anger and committed the murder to a tragic end. Even though he is proved innocent, his rage at the cloud of suspicion has driven the woman he loves away for good. No question of Steele's innocence exists in the novel, which follows the investigation of a murder Steele plainly committed and his interference in the investigation for his own ends.

Curtis Hanson, in the DVD featurette 'In A Lonely Place Revisited', further analyses the similarities and differences between the novel and the film. He notes that there is a parallel in the film between Steele's adaptation of a novel for film and the adaptation of In a Lonely Place for film. He also notes that a difference between Steele in the film and Steele in the novel is found in the way he treats women. In the novel Steele pursues women and the first chapter details his pursuit of a woman. In the film, Steele is pursued by women.

Hughes' novel was out of print for decades, until re-released by The Feminist Press at CUNY in 2003, which edition was still in print in 2010. Penguin Books published a paperback edition in the UK in 2010 as part of their Modern Classics imprint, and the Library of America included it in the first volume of their "Women Crime Writers" collection. The novel has been available from New York Review of Books Classics since 2017.
