= Kleeware =

Toy

Kleeware is a brand of plastic toy developed and marketed by the company O & M Kleeman in the 1950s in the UK. The range of toys was extensive and included soldiers, boats, cars, model houses and dolls.

Kleeware TV Bank toy
