= Denis McLoughlin =

British illustrator (1918–2002)

- Born: 15 April 1918; Bolton, Lancashire, England
- Died: 22 April 2002 (aged 84); Bolton, Lancashire, England
- Known for: Illustrating comic book, magazine and book covers

Denis McLoughlin (15 April 1918 – 22 April 2002) was a British illustrator who illustrated magazine and book covers as well as British comic books.

Over the course of his career, which lasted 70 years, McLoughlin produced over a hundred paperback covers, about 550 monthly Bloodhound Detective dust jacket illustrations, several Bloodhound Detective Story Magazine and other pulp magazine covers, and over a hundred other book covers. He was best known for his illustrations for British comic books.

== Biography ==
Denis McLoughlin in his work room (circa 1980), holding a copy of the American first edition of his book Wild and Woolly: An Encyclopedia of the Old West. Western mural also by McLoughlin.

=== Early life and background ===
Denis McLoughlin was born on 15 April 1918, in Bolton, Lancashire, England, where he still resided at the time of his death, 22 April 2002. Always interested in drawing, McLoughlin credits his artistic influence as film, pulp magazines (particularly the covers), and American comics. In the 1930s he collected American True Detective type magazines and American pulp magazines. McLoughlin also sought out the work of Alex Raymond (Flash Gordon, Secret Agent Corrigan) who he also calls an influence. On scholarship, in 1932, he attended the Bolton School of Art under a scholarship and two years late joined Ward & Copley Art Studio of Manchester. At Ward & Copley from 1932 until about January 1940 when lack of business ended his employment, McLoughlin found himself creating product illustrations for catalogues and newspaper advertisements for 10/- a week.

=== Boardman Books ===
T.V. Boardman, Ltd., was but one of many London publishing houses turning out both paperback and hardcover books, pulp magazines, and comics. Boardman pioneered British reprinting of American comics. During the week of 16 October 1937, the first issue of a Boardman tabloid comic in the traditional British format, Okay Comics Weekly, arrived at newsagents all over England. The content was mostly American newspaper strips and the first issue sported a cover strip by Will Eisner. Okay lasted only until 26 February 1938, or a total of twenty issues. At about this same time, other British publishers experimented with reprinting American comics and imports of the real thing began to land on British shores. It rapidly became apparent that a significant British market for American comic books existed.

However, the British declaration of war on Germany on 3 September 1939, immediately halted the official importation of American comics into the United Kingdom although masses of American comics intended for G.I.s began arriving in 1942. Already with a taste for American comics, Thomas Volney Boardman, Sr., made an arrangement with Everett Arnold of Quality Comics to produce British editions of two titles, Feature Comics (#29–33) and Smash Comics (#7–11) all appearing in 1940–1941. Because Boardman needed low priced titles to please his primary outlet, Woolworth's Department Stores, the British editions reprinted only about half the content of the American originals. To use the rest of the pages, Boardman created two additional corresponding titles in the American style, Super Funnies (#29–33) and Mystery Comics (#7–11).

=== British Army in World War II ===
Drafted in March 1940, Denis McLoughlin served with the Royal Artillery's 101st Light Anti-Aircraft and Anti-Tank Regiment (later the 1st Armoured Brigade). He managed to practice his art by painting a rhino insignia on the regiment's vehicles and by painting at least 37 murals of different sizes in various military buildings. His unofficial position of regimental painter gained McLoughlin much greater freedom than the common soldier and allowed him several opportunities to practice his art. In the beginning, he painted officer's portraits for 5/- each. Soon, however, a London publisher, Wells Gardner, Darton & Co., offered him work painting book covers at the rate of £5 each. The first of these covers was for Frank Gruber's Navy Colt which appeared in 1943. Other covers followed for Wells Gardner, Darton & Co. which eventually recommended McLoughlin to Boardman Books. Having no work, however, Boardman passed Denis on to Australian-owned Kangaroo Books.

=== Kangaroo Books ===
For Kangaroo Books (their logo looked amazingly like that of America's Pocket Books), McLoughlin painted a few paperback covers but primarily produced joke books. The publisher paid £18 each for these which included writing about 50 jokes, illustrating them, and producing the cover. After doing the first joke book, probably Laughter for the Home Front, solo, McLoughlin enlisted the aid of his brother Colin (b. 2 November 1925) with the writing chore. Thus began a working relationship between the McLoughlin brothers that would last at least into the 1950s and that produced New Laughs for All, Laugh While You Work, You've Had It, and This Is It for Kangaroo.

It was for Kangaroo books that Denis McLoughlin produced his first comic book work. He created an eight-page adaptation of General George Armstrong Custer's last stand based primarily on his hazy memory of the film They Died With Their Boots On. The story seems likely to have seen publication in an unnumbered and undated threepenny issue of Lightning Comics sometime between 1943 and January 1946.

=== McLoughlin at Boardman Books ===
Denis McLoughlin's "official" association with Boardman began after his January 1946 military discharge and took the form of a three-year book cover contract. Of McLoughlin's extensive cover work for Boardman Books a great deal could be said. However, in late 1947, T.V. Boardman, Sr., decided to go after a portion of the market for "American style" comic books left unfilled by the departure of the American army and the British governments continued ban on comic book importation. Boardman's re-entry into the comic field took place during a post-war comics publishing boom in England. McLoughlin's contribution to Boardman's comic publishing caused author Denis Gifford to call him "Boardman's one-man art department." Beginning in 1948, Boardman's comic book production followed two paths, inexpensive rotogravure comic books and lavishly produced comic annual publications .

=== Rotogravure Series ===
Boardman's three pence rotogravure series began monthly production in February 1948. Issues were twelve pages long and used both front and back covers as story pages. They were printed in three colours (generally black, white, and red or green) on clay coated paper and saddle-stitched at the spine. In American publishing, they most closely resemble Will Eisner's Spirit Sunday newspaper inserts. Mildly inspired by Alex Raymond, Denis and Colin filled the first seven issues with the adventures of detective Roy Carson and adventure, science fiction hero Swift Morgan. Although titles changed with each issue, numbering remained consistent to the entire series. Issue eight saw the addition of Lennart Ek's Buffalo Bill reprinted from a Swiss source but always repackaged by Denis. Eventually, he would create some original Buffalo Bill stories for the series but his involvement with other projects for Boardman caused the reprint content of the rotogravure series to increase. Still holding the rights to material from Quality Comics, Blackhawk (at least sixteen issues) and the Spirit (probably only two issues) were added to the rotation of titles. These reprints were always repackaged by Denis McLoughlin. The twelve-page rotogravure format lasted for 44 issues until October 1951. In February 1953, the series numbering continued but with color covers and black & white interiors until probably sometime in 1954. It seems possible that number 61, featuring Blackhawk, was the last issue. Rebound newsagent returns of the rotogravure series were released as Super Colour Annuals (there were three, 1949–1951).

=== Buffalo Bill Wild West Annuals ===
One reason for McLoughlin's partial withdrawal from the rotogravure series late in 1948 was the introduction of Christmas annuals to the Boardman line under their Popular Press imprint. The first of these, Buffalo Bill Wild West Annual number one, appeared in time for the 1949 Christmas market. The book's production was rushed because T.V. Boardman, Sr., did not decide to proceed with the project until the last minute. Success of the experiment assured that the title would continue and another Buffalo Bill Wild West Annual appeared in time for Christmas every year through the 1961 issue. Both annual series offered a mixture of American comic reprints (mostly from Quality) combined with British original comic stories (almost always by the brothers McLoughlin), text features, puzzles, gags, and games.

After the 1948 issue, each Buffalo Bill Wild West Annual took Denis, who had almost total creative control over the project, about six months to produce. He began with a blank dummy of the Annual and positioned each story and feature to get the layout. T.V. Boardman had to approve each project and a representative of Woolworth's Department Stores, which were the primary outlet for the annuals, had final veto power. McLoughlin obviously lavished his attention on the Buffalo Bill annuals. Here his graphic story-telling reached new heights. As the series progressed the amount of research for each story obviously increased contributing a high degree of realism to the series. By the last few annuals almost all of the stories were based on solid history. "Ghost Towns," for example, in 1958's Buffalo Bill Wild West Annual number ten provides a poignant comment on the passing of the American West with a level of understanding unique for the time and seldom seen in comic book westerns of any period.

=== Adventure Annuals Series ===
Denis McLoughlin had the same creative control over the "adventure" annual series. Unlike the Buffalo Bill annuals, the Adventure series was not numbered. It also tended to contain a much higher percentage of reprinted American material and shows evidence of much less research. The first of these publications was Ajax Adventure Annual which appeared in 1952. The order of the adventure series is probably Ajax Adventure Annual in 1952; Adventure Annual, 1953; New Spaceways Comic Annual No. 1, 1954; Okay Adventure Annual, 1955–1957; Okay Annual of Adventure Stories, 1958–1959; and the First Book of Heroes, c. 1959/60. Both Adventure Annual and New Spaceways Comic Annual feature Roy Carson and Swift Morgan stories. New Spaceways also features a variety of Quality super-hero reprints including Plastic Man and Doll Man and has art by Reed Crandall and Matt Baker, making it, of all the Boardman annuals, the most desirable to collectors in the United States. The First Book of Heroes was designed by McLoughlin but only has one page of his art.

=== Decline of Boardman Books ===
With the single exception of the Buffalo Bill Wild West Annual, by the mid to late-1950s, Boardman comics were no more and, after the 1961 issue, Buffalo Bill folded as well. Denis McLoughlin continued to illustrate book covers for Boardman Books until 1967, when the company folded. Even prior to Boardman's demise, McLoughlin turned to other publishers for work. Even though Boardman retained the copyright, the last four Buffalo Bill annuals were prepared for Dean & Son Publishing, Ltd., and printed by Purnell & Sons, Ltd., both London firms. After Boardman folded, McLoughlin helped produce several western annuals for Purnell all based on American Western TV shows: The Dakotas Annual for 1963 and 1964, Gunsmoke Annual for 1965–1967, and Bonanza Annual for 1969.

=== McLoughlin after Boardman ===
In 1967, McLoughlin went to work for IPC, then the largest comic publisher in the United Kingdom. He took over the art chores on "Saber" (kind of a blonde Tarzan) and also drew "Big Hit Swift" (a cricket strip which McLoughlin detested) for the pages of Tiger. From 20 March to 21 October 1971, McLoughlin illustrated "Fury's Family" about a boy and his menagerie for Lion. McLoughlin then took about two years off from comics to finish the compilation of Wild & Woolly, his encyclopaedia of the American West published by Doubleday in 1974. Although McLoughlin had been promised that he would be able to return to IPC, no stories were made available after the book project was finished.

=== D.C. Thomson and Co., Ltd. ===
After sending art samples, McLoughlin found stories to illustrate for the Scottish publishing firm D.C. Thomson and Co., Ltd., in 1974. He has been working for them ever since and contributed to just about all of their adventure titles (all of which are now defunct) including Wizard, Victor, Buddy, Crunch, Bullet, and Scoop. Primarily, however, McLoughlin's work appeared in Wizard. At his height with the company (22 October 1977), five McLoughlin stories were published in the two Thomson titles, Wizard and Bullet. Perhaps the best regarded of McLoughlin's strips for Thomson were "Sign of the Shark" featuring x-agent Jake Jeffords, "The Green Lizard" which was a science fiction tale, and "The Shark" featuring the crew of a German E-Boat during World War II. Unfortunately, the days of the traditional British comic story paper were already numbered by the late-1970s and by 1983, most ceased publication. Denis drew two western features for the 1983 Look and Learn Annual before beginning his monthly stint for Thomson's Commando, a 64-page war comic digest which sees four issues released twice a month (96 issues a year). McLoughlin produced about one issue of Commando a month until his death on 22 April 2002.

=== Death ===
Exactly a week after his 84th birthday and while in good health, Denis McLoughlin committed suicide. He used a Colt revolver that had been part of his reference collection for years and that friends and family thought was non-functioning. The cause of Denis' death was not immediately revealed in the British press. Exactly why he chose to end his life can never be known. However, he had survived all of the persons dearest to him including his wife, Dorothy, and brother, Colin. Denis and Dorothy had no children.

Like many others who devoted their life to commercial art in the first half of the 20th century, Denis McLoughlin was never paid a great deal for his work. Many pieces of his artwork, the Boardman book covers in particular, which Denis had been promised would be returned to him, were either lost or ended up in private collections. While he made a living, Denis never accumulated much money. Although he had a pension from the British government, he was forced to augment his income by working long past retirement age. He once commented that he never particularly liked illustrating military topics and yet that is what he found himself doing for the last 20 years of his life. Perhaps, had he been given cowboy stories to illustrate, he might have been happier.

== Comicography ==
Because it has no overall title, Boardman Books' Rotogravure series is listed first. Other McLoughlin illustrated comic books follow in alphabetical order.

=== T. V. Boardman-Popular Press 3d Series ===
1. Roy Carson "Smashing the Crime Wave with Roy Carson" [Feb. 1948]
2. Swift Morgan "In the Lost World" [March 1948]
3. Roy Carson "Meets Cheetah, Queen of Spies" [April 1948]
4. Swift Morgan "And the Ancient Romans" [May 1948]
5. Roy Carson "Strikes Again" [June 1948]
6. Swift Morgan "And the Ancient Egyptians" [July 1948]
7. Roy Carson "Versus the Marquis" [Aug. 1948]
8. Buffalo Bill "In the Wild West" (Swiss Reprint) Oct. 1948
9. Swift Morgan "And the Feathered Serpent" [November 1948]
10. Buffalo Bill "In Nebraska" (Swiss Reprint) [Dec. 1948]
11. Blackhawk "And the Satana Gang" (US Reprint with McLoughlin splash) [January 1949]
12. Spirit "And the Gunman's War Bride" (US Reprint, WarBrides, with McLoughlin splash) [Feb.] 1949
13. Roy Carson "And the Cornish Smugglers" [March 1949]
14. Buffalo Bill "And the Border Bandit" (Swiss Reprint) [April 1949]
15. Blackhawk "Meets Madam Butterfly" (Redrawn US Reprint) [May 1949]
16. Swift Morgan "In Atlantis" [June 1949]
17. Spirit "The Masked Crime Buster" (US Reprint with McLoughlin splash) [July] 1949
18. Blackhawk "Meets Twilight" (US Reprint) [Aug. 1949]
19. Buffalo Bill "Meets Yellowhand" [Sept. 1949]
20. Blackhawk "Versus Skaggs Raiders"(US Reprint) [Oct. 1949]
21. Blackhawk "and the Air Pirates"(US Reprint) [November 1949]
22. Buffalo Bill "And the Bank Robbers" (Swiss Reprint) [Dec. 1949]
23. Roy Carson "And the Case of the Educated Ape" [January 1950]
24. Buffalo Bill "Rides Again" (Swiss Reprint) [Feb. 1950]
25. Blackhawk "and the Director of Evil"(US Reprint) [March 1950]
26. Buffalo Bill "And the Indian Idol" (Swiss Reprint) [April 1950]
27. Blackhawk "and the Desert Terror" (US Reprint) [May 1950]
28. Blackhawk "and the Fire Bug" (US Reprint) [June 1950]
29. Buffalo Bill "Outwits the Cheyenne" (Swiss Reprint) [July 1950]
30. Swift Morgan "And the Flying Saucers" [Aug. 1950]
31. Buffalo Bill "And the Doomed Patrol" (Swiss Reprint) [Sept. 1950]
32. Blackhawk "And the Germ Killers" (US Reprint) [Oct. 1950]
33. Buffalo Bill "And the Bandits of Monterey" [November 1950]
34. Roy Carson "And the Return of Annette" [Dec. 1950]
35. Buffalo Bill "And the Iron Cayuse" [January 1951]
36. Roy Carson "And the Boxing Racketeers" Feb. 1951
37. Buffalo Bill "And the Masked Riders" [March 1951]
38. Swift Morgan "And the Greek Wars" April 1951
39. Buffalo Bill "And the Phantom" (Ron Embleton art) [May 1951]
40. Blackhawk "The Prison of Despair" (US Reprint) [June 1951]
41. Buffalo Bill "And the Crooked Deputy" [July 1951]
42. Blackhawk "And the Flying Eagles" (US Reprint) [Aug. 1951]
43. Buffalo Bill "And the Circle 6 Rustler" [Sept. 1951]
44. Blackhawk "and the Phanton Clock" (US Reprint) [Oct. 1951]
45. Buffalo Bill Comic "The Bandit's Loot" January 1953
46. Roy Carson Comic "Roy Carson and the Missing Will" and "Roy Carson vs. the Empress" January 1953
47. Blackhawk (US Reprint) "Devil's Squadron" and "Vampire Men of Kunwalo" and "Terror of the Crimson Hoods" [Feb. 1953]
48. Crack Western (US Reprint) [Feb. 1953]
49. Buffalo Bill Comic "Treasure of Coyote Mountain" March 1953
50. Swift Morgan Space Comic "The Planet of Destiny" and "Sam English, Museum Rover" March 1953
51. Crack Western (US Reprint) [1953]
52. Swift Morgan Spaceways Comic "Beast from Outer Space" and "Roy Carson Meets Waldo the Mystic" November 1953
53. Blackhawk (US Reprint) "Death in the Iron Mask" and "The Death Legion" and "The Invasion from Within" [1954]
54. Roy Carson Comic* "Roy Carson Meets Waldo the Mystic" and "Swift Morgan on the Isle of Giants" 1954
55. Crack Western (US Reprint) [1954]
56. Plastic Man (US Reprint) [1954]
57. Blackhawk (US Reprint) "The Attack to end the World" and "The Flying Buzz-saws!" and "Blackhawk Loses his Wings!" [1954]
58. Unknown [1954]
59. Blackhawk (US Reprint) "Blackhawk Battles the Hangman" and "Blackhawk Retires" and "The Tyrannical Freaks" [1954]
60. Plastic Man(?) (US Reprint) [1954]
61. Blackhawk (US Reprint) "The Sky Sleds" and "Plan of Death" and "The Blackhawks—Wanted for Murder" [1954]

=== Ace Adventure album ===
- Published by Moring in the late-1950s. Reprints the cover from one of the Okay Adventure Annuals. Hardcover.

=== Action album ===
- Published by Moring in the late-1950s. Reprints Swift Morgan, Roy Carson and Buffalo Bill from the Boardman rotogravure series.

=== Adventure album ===
- Published by G.T. Ltd. in the late 1950s. Reprints Buffalo Bill from either the Boardman Rotogravure series or from the Buffalo Bill Wild West Annual series.

=== Adventure Annual Series ===
These volumes, traditional British comic and story annuals, were published each year in time for Christmas shopping. They are cloth bound with full-color painted covers and probably came with dust jackets that duplicated the illustrations on the board covers. These dust jackets, however, are seldom found. Interior contents are a mix of original British material (often by McLoughlin) and reprints from American comics, usually Quality. Primary distribution came through the Woolworth's chain where toys matching characters and vehicles from the stories were also on sale. Little is known about the original pricing of the volumes although some are thought to have been priced at 7/6. No issues were numbered or dated and the order given here may not be entirely accurate. It is clear, however, that the order of issues presented in several British fanzines and publications is hopelessly wrong. It seems likely that the three Supercoloured Comic Annuals and the New Spaceways Comic Annual should be considered part of this series. This would give it an unbroken run of one annual a year from 1949 to 1959 which would nearly correspond with the Buffalo Bill series. Copies of each of these annuals with dated gift inscriptions confirm that the estimate of dates is fairly accurate. British collector Paul Annis' research confirms most of these dates.

- 1952 Ajax Adventure Annual, Elephant Cover
- 1953 Adventure Annual, "The Robot Empire" Swift Morgan / "Roy Carson and the Old Master"
- 1954 New Spaceways Comic Annual No. 1, Swift Morgan cover
- 1955 Okay Adventure Annual, Saurian Expedition cover
- 1956 Okay Adventure Annual, Last Stand of Major Wilson cover.
- 1957 Okay Adventure Annual, Cowboy (front)/Roman Ship (back)
- 1958 Okay Annual of Adventure Stories, Trooper in Town/Highwayman
- 1959 Okay Annual of Adventure Stories, Native American/Diver

=== All Action Comic ===
- Published by Dragon Press in the late-1950s. McLoughlin reprints reported but contents unknown.

=== All Worlds album ===
- Published by Moring in the late-1950s. Includes Swift Morgan and the Feathered Serpent by McLoughlin. This story was actually a Boardman reject and was reproduced from artwork that Denis considered unfinished.

=== Buffalo Bill Wild West Annual ===
Nearly identical in design to the Adventure Annual series, Buffalo Bill Annual was T.V. Boardman's most successful comic/story annual series. Beginning in 1949, the Buffalo Bill series lasted until 1961. Unlike the Adventure series, Buffalo Bill was produced almost entirely in England (except for portions of the 1952 issue which were reprinted from American sources).

As good as Denis McLoughlin's work on other Boardman titles was, it steps up to another level in the Buffalo Bill Annuals. Here McLoughlin's passion for the American West found the outlet it had been denied in the three pence rotogravure series. Only comic stories are listed here but McLoughlin provided dozens of text illustrations, decorated maps, and paintings in each volume.

Boardman also lavished production values on these annuals allowing more full-color painted artwork, more four-color comic stories, and more original material. Rather than the superficial treatment of the American West found in other children's publications, McLoughlin, with writers Arthur Groom, Rex James, and Colin McLoughlin (Denis' brother), produced intelligent and historically accurate pieces.

Unlike the Adventure Annual series, Buffalo Bill is always dated and/or numbered. Several were published under the Popular Press imprint.

==== Buffalo Bill Wild West Annual No. 1 (1949) ====
- Written by Arthur Groome and illustrated by Denis McLoughlin.
  - Enter Buffalo Bill (origin)
  - Weapons of the West
  - Bandit Game
  - Round Up
  - Calamity Jane (origin)
  - Lessons of Buffalo Bill
  - Cowboy's Kit
  - Terror of the Range
  - Wild Bill's First 'Killing'
  - Chief White Owl
  - Buffalo Bill's Wild West Show

==== Buffalo Bill Wild West Annual No. 2 (1950) ====
- Written by Arthur Groome and illustrated by Denis McLoughlin.
  - Fight
  - Camp
  - Red Men of the West
  - Historical Wanderers
  - Oregon Trail
  - Bad Men
  - They Brought Law to the West
  - Curiosities of the West
  - $15,000,000 Ranch

==== Buffalo Bill Wild West Annual No. 3 (1951) ====
- Written by Arthur Groome and illustrated by Denis McLoughlin.
  - Gold
  - Battle of Beecher's Island
  - Overcoat
  - Wells Fargo Company
  - Great Indian Flood
  - Coffin Crooks
  - Panther
  - Indian Joe

==== Buffalo Bill Wild West Annual No. 4 (1952) ====
- Written by Arthur Groome and illustrated by Denis McLoughlin.
  - Gunfighter
  - Cannonball Green
  - Counterfeit Whip (US reprint)
  - Two-Gun Lil- Six-Guns From the Sky (US reprint)
  - Great Cochise
  - Bob Allen Frontier Marshal- Fastest Gun in the West (US reprint)
  - Bob Allen Frontier Marshal- Gun-Slinger's Gratitude (US reprint)
  - Saga of Salt Lake City
  - Saddle
  - Coyote

==== Buffalo Bill Wild West Annual No. 5 (1953) ====
- Written by Arthur Groome Illustrated by Denis McLoughlin.
  - Deadwood Coach
  - Cherokee Strip
  - Man From Texas
  - Highlights of a Dangerous Life
  - Ghost Riders
  - Diggings
  - Pony Express
  - Dime Novel King (Ned Buntline)

==== Buffalo Bill Wild West Annual No. 6 (1954) ====
- Written by Arthur Groome and illustrated by Denis McLoughlin.
  - Second Sitting Bull
  - Buffalo Bill—Indian Fighter
  - Benson Stage
  - Wordless Language
  - Arizona Cattle War
  - They Led the Red Men
  - Boy General
  - Whispering Wires
  - One Man Against a Nation

==== Buffalo Bill Wild West Annual No. 7 (1955) ====
- Written by Rex James and Colin McLoughlin. Illustrated by Denis McLoughlin.
  - Pow-Wow
  - Renegade Ranger
  - Red Medicine
  - Death Valley Scotty
  - Frontier Scouts
  - The Innocents
  - The Saga of Tombstone
  - Goodnight of Texas
  - Warpath

==== Buffalo Bill Wild West Annual No. 8 (1956) ====
- Written by Rex James and Colin McLoughlin. Illustrated by Denis McLoughlin.
  - Mountain Men
  - Long Haired Sheriff
  - Pony Express
  - Little Wolf Goes Home
  - Texas Killer
  - Bullion of Panamint
  - Other Redmen (RCMP)
  - Frontier Forts

==== Buffalo Bill Wild West Annual No. 9 (1957) ====
- Written by Rex James and Colin McLoughlin. Illustrated by Denis McLoughlin.
  - Secret of the Superstitions
  - Two-Fisted Marshal
  - Silent Gunman
  - Indian Scout
  - Gunfighters
  - Dude Sheriff
  - Apache Kid

==== Buffalo Bill Wild West Annual No. 10 (1958) ====
- Written by Rex James and Colin McLoughlin. Illustrated by Denis McLoughlin.
  - Lord of Lost River
  - Tamer of El Paso
  - Ghost Towns
  - Iron Horse
  - Lone Rider
  - Indian Boyhood
  - Death Song

==== Buffalo Bill Wild West Annual No. 11 (1959) ====
- Written by Rex James and Colin McLoughlin. Illustrated by Denis McLoughlin.
  - The Reno Brothers
  - Queens of the Mississippi
  - Crazy Horse
  - Wild Bill
  - Wyatt Earp tames Tombstone
  - Tales to their Hide
  - Clay Allison – Gunman
  - Tombstone Enterprise
  - Frontier Sergeant
  - Indian Dictionary
  - Cattle Drive
  - The Second Sitting Bull (reprint from #6)
  - Highlights of a Dangerous Life
  - The Diggings
  - Buffalo Bill Cody – Chief of Scouts
  - Frontier Laughs
  - The Wildest Town in the West

==== Buffalo Bill Wild West Annual No. 12 (1960) ====
- Written by Rex James and Colin McLoughlin. Illustrated by Denis McLoughlin.
  - Sierra Rein
  - Sons of Grizzlies
  - Texas Townships
  - Frontier Medics
  - The Wild West

=== Buffalo Bill True West Annual ===
- Continues from the Buffalo Bill Wild West Annual series.

==== Buffalo Bill True West Annual No. 13 (1961) ====
- Written by Rex James and illustrated by Denis McLoughlin
  - Lost Mines
  - Deadlier than the Six-Gun
  - Stage West

=== Buffalo Bill Comic album ===
- nn (circa 1955/1956) 68 pages. Reprints eight of the Boardman rotogravure Buffalo Bill comics. published by Moring.

=== Comic Art of Denis McLoughlin ===
- 1 (April 2007) 102 pages including covers. 96 pages of Denis McLoughlin's comic stories from the 1940s and 1950s reprinted in the original black and white. Published by Boardman Books, a Memphis, Tennessee, rare book dealer.

=== Commando: War Stories in Pictures ===
- Published by D.C. Thomson and Co., Ltd. These digest size comics have been part of the British comics market since July 1961. They are still being issued at the rate of four issues every two weeks and, so far, there are over 3,500 issues. Starting with #1623 Fight Back which was published in late July 1982, Denis McLoughlin contributed about one issue every five to six weeks until the time of his death. Since then, issues of Commando frequently reprint stories illustrated by McLoughlin. So far 171 issues have been identified as being illustrated by Denis McLoughlin between July 1982 and October 2002.

=== Lightning Comics ===
- Published by Kangaroo Books in about 1946.

=== New Spaceways Comic Annual No. 1 (1954) ===
- Includes reprints of three Boardman rotogravure comics as well as various other McLoughlin illustrations. Denis McLoughlin, creative director for the series, based most of the spacemen, rockets, flying saucers, space creatures, robots, etc. on the toys then carried by Woolworth's. Woolworth's were the primary distributor of the Boardman annuals in the United Kingdom, Australia, New Zealand, Canada, and all over the former British Empire. Some of the Pyro/Kleeware/Tudor Rose toys used as models for this annual include: X-300 Space Cruiser (silver – top front cover); X-300 Space Cruiser (landed – front cover foreground); Johillco Spacemen (front cover); and Tudor Rose Space Clipper (front cover bottom left inset).
- The comic contents include three British original stories by Denis McLoughlin and a third by an unknown artist. One McLoughlin story features hard boiled detective Roy Carson while the other has science fiction hero Swift Morgan. The story Swift Morgan and the Flying Saucers is a reprint from 1949. As such, it is a very early UFO story. The other comic content is reprinted (in color and black and white) from US Quality Comics Group. Comic content includes:
  - Zip O'Daly Rocket Ship Pilot (British original?)
  - Swift Morgan and the Flying Saucers by Denis McLoughlin
  - Eric Falcon – The Surrender of Eric Falcon
  - Chop Chop by Matt Baker
  - Plastic Man – Grandma Crookes by Jack Cole
  - The Whip – Crimson Vengeance (origin) by Reed Crandall
  - Doll Man – The Full Moon Monster
  - Corsair Queen – King of Corpse Cay
  - Swift Morgan and the Ancient Egyptians by Denis McLoughlin
  - Roy Carson Strikes Again by Denis McLoughlin
  - Arizona Raines Water Hogs Die Broke might be by Matt Baker

=== Purnell Annuals ===
- Shortly after T.V. Boardman ceased publication of all comic annuals, Purnell purchased Dean (Dean had published the last four of the "Buffalo Bill" Annuals). Despite still having plenty of work provided by Boardman for their Bloodhound Mystery series of hardcovers, paperbacks, and pulp magazines, McLoughlin was enticed to work on a number of comic annual projects for Purnell. All were based on American TV Westerns.
  - Dakotas Annual (1963 (1), published September 1962) McLoughlin endpapers, text illustrations for one story, and three comic stories.
  - Dakotas Annual (1964 (2), published September 1963) McLoughlin endpapers, text illustrations, and comic stories.
  - Gunsmoke Annual (1964 (1), published September 1963) "New Stories Based on the Famous Television Series." Again, McLoughlin endpapers, text illustrations, and comic stories. Some parties consider the first Gunsmoke Annual to be McLoughlin's finest work in western comics.
  - Gunsmoke Annual (1965 (2), published September 1964) McLoughlin endpapers, text illustrations, and comic stories.
  - Gunsmoke Annual (1966 (3), published September 1965) McLoughlin endpapers, text illustrations, and comic stories.
  - Gunsmoke Annual (1967 (4), published September 1966) McLoughlin endpapers, text illustrations, and comic stories.
  - Bonanza Annual (1968, published September 1967) McLoughlin cover only.

=== Red Dagger Library ===
- D.C. Thomson & Co., Ltd. October 1979 – June 1984. Thomson reprinted serial stories from their weekly comics in 64-page, single issue comics. Three of McLoughlin's stories were selected and reprinted.
  - 9 – "Terror in the Tall Tower"
  - 13 – "The Frozen Man on the Mountain" – British Secret Service Agent, Jake Jeffords
  - 17 – "The Secret of Black Island" – British Secret Service Agent, Jake Jeffords

=== Roy Carson Comic ===
- 64-page undated (circa 1954) comic reprints eight of the Roy Carson issues from the Boardman rotogravure series. Published by Moring.

=== Sharpshooters Western album ===
- Published by G.T. Ltd. (Date Unknown, 1950s) Reprints Boardman rotogravures No. 41, 43, and 49.

=== Super album ===
- Published by Moring in the late-1950s. Reprints Arthur Groome's The Conquered Goddess which has McLoughlin illustrations.

=== Super Thrill album ===
- Published by G.T. Ltd. in the late-1950s. Reprints the cover from Adventure Annual.

=== Supercoloured Comic Annual ===
- Published by Boardman Books. If "coloured" can be read to mean two-coloured then this title might be accurate. Boardman rebound newsagent returns of his their three pence rotogravure series with a smattering of new material to produce these albums. So, it is quite possible to find different content within each of the issues listed. Some collectors group this series with the Adventure Annual series and New Spaceways Comic Annual and consider them as a single series.
  - 1 (1949) Bound returns with some new material.
  - 2 (1950) Bound returns and Swift Morgan and the Knights of the Round Table which is only found in this volume.
  - 3 (1951) Six bound returns, two US reprints. Also includes text stories Blackhawk and the Screaming Demon and Roy Carson and the Phantom Pearls, each heavily illustrated by Denis McLoughlin.

=== Swift Morgan Spaceways album ===
- Published by Moring in the late-1950s. Reprints McLoughlin Swift Morgan stories.

=== Trigger Western album ===
- Published by G.T. Ltd. (Date Unknown, 1950s) Reprints Boardman rotogravures No. 35, 45, and 31.
