= HMS Bloodhound (1845) =

Gunvessel of the Royal Navy

History

United Kingdom
- Name: HMS Bloodhound
- Ordered: 16 January 1844
- Builder: Robert Napier and Sons, Govan
- Yard number: 10
- Laid down: 1844
- Launched: 9 January 1845
- Commissioned: 26 September 1845
- Reclassified: Fitted as a tender to Sampson, 1849-51
- Fate: Broken up in 1866

General characteristics
- Class & type: Second-class gunvessel
- Tons burthen: 378 10/94 bm
- Length: 146 ft (44.5 m) (overall); 134 ft 4 1/2 in (41.0 m) (keel)
- Beam: 23 ft (7.0 m)
- Depth of hold: 13 ft 6 in (4.11 m)
- Propulsion: 2-cylinder side-lever engine; 150 nhp
- Sail plan: 2-masted schooner
- Complement: 60
- Armament: 1 × 18-pounder (22cwt) (Note: 22 cwt is the weight of the gun ("cwt" = hundredweight)) carronade on pivot; 2 × 24-pounder (13cwt) carronades

HMS Bloodhound was an iron-hulled paddle gunvessel of the Royal Navy. She was built by Robert Napier and Sons at Govan, to a design drawn up by the builder. She was fitted as a tender to the paddle frigate Sampson at Portsmouth between 1849 and 1851,

She was broken up in 1866.

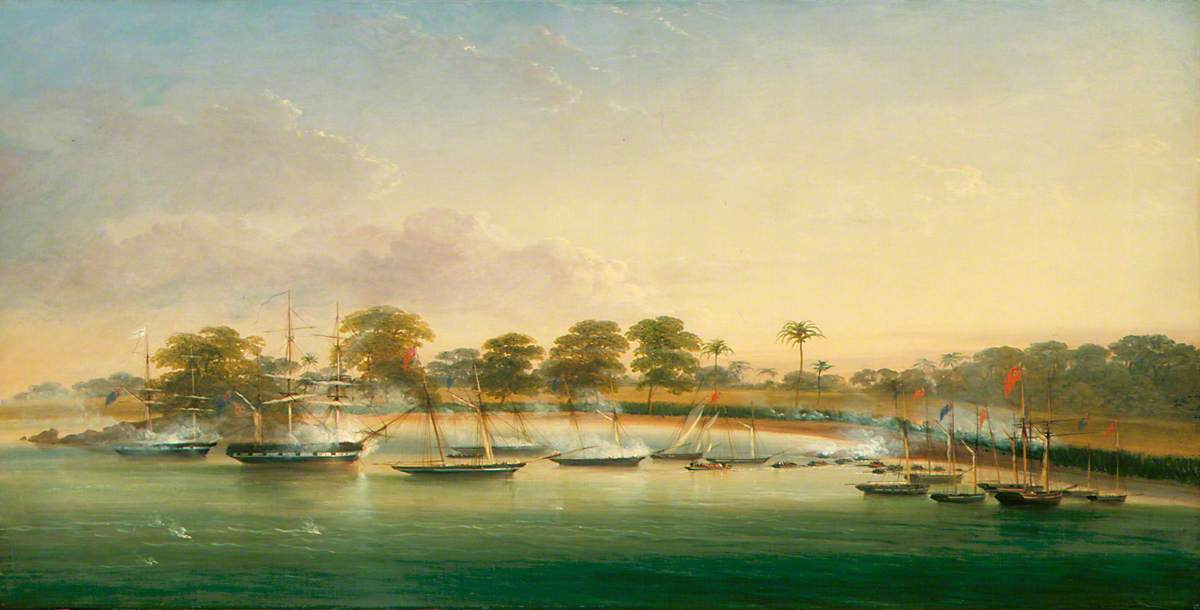
Boodhound attended the Reduction of Lagos, in December 1851
