= Lawrence Blochman =

American crime writer (1900–1975)

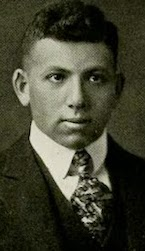
Author Lawrence G. Blochman, ca. 1922

Lawrence Goldtree Blochman (February 17, 1900 – January 22, 1975) was an American detective story writer and translator.

Lawrence Blochman was born on February 17, 1900, in San Diego, California, to Lucien A. Blochman, a banker, and his wife Haidee Goldtree. He began writing early. As a junior at San Diego High School, Blochman reported school sports for the San Diego Evening Tribune and, as a senior, he replaced the Tribune sports editor who had left to serve in World War I. Blochman then attended the University of California, Berkeley, where he edited the college newspaper, the Daily Californian. In the summer he served as a police reporter for the Tribune and a courthouse reporter for the San Diego Sun. He graduated from college in 1921.

After graduation, he tried to write his "way around the world", working in Tokyo for the Japan Advertiser, in Hong Kong for the South China Morning Post, in Shanghai for the Far Eastern Review, in Calcutta for The Englishman, and in Paris for the Chicago Tribune. He returned to San Diego as city editor of the Sun in 1924. In 1926, he married Marguerite Maillard in Paris.

Writing as Lawrence G. Blochman, he published more than 50 books, including many mystery and detective novels, as well as several hundred short stories, novelettes, and articles. Several of his stories were made into films, television programs, and radio shows. One of Blochman's characters, the pathologist Dr. Daniel Webster Coffee, appears in several novels and short stories.

He also translated several books and detective stories from French, including work by the Belgian writer Georges Simenon. At least six of Blochman's own thrillers were translated into French by others, maintaining the connection with France that he established during his "around the world" years.

In 1948, Blochman served as the fourth president of the Mystery Writers of America, following Baynard Kendrick, Ellery Queen, and Hugh Pentecost. In 1951, Blochman's "Diagnosis: Homicide" received an Edgar Award in the Best Short Story category. He was vice president of the Overseas Press Club and winner of its Meritorious Service Award in 1959.

Blochman died on January 22, 1975, at St. Luke's Hospital (now Mount Sinai Morningside) in New York City.

== Works ==
=== Original fiction ===
Some of Blochman's novels evolved from earlier short stories or serials with the same name.

- Bombay Mail (1934)
- Bengal Fire (1937)
- Red Snow at Darjeeling (1938)
- Midnight Sailing (1938)
- Blow Down (1939)
- Wives to Burn (1940)
- See You at the Morgue (1941)
- Diagnosis: Homicide (1950)
- Death Walks in Marble Halls (1951), also known as Murder Walks in Marble Halls
- Pursuit (1951)
- Rather Cool for Mayhem (1951)
- Recipe for Homicide (1952), featuring Dr. Coffee
- Clues for Dr. Coffee: A Second Casebook (1964), short stories

=== Other books ===
Blochman also translated at least ten books from French into English, mostly thrillers; wrote or co-wrote at least nine popular non-fiction titles, mostly on medical topics; and occasionally served as a (credited) ghostwriter.

== Works cited ==
- Casper, Trudie (1977). Furzer, Summer (ed.). "The Blochman Saga in San Diego". The Journal of San Diego History. 23 (1). ISSN 0022-4383.
