= In a Lonely Place (novel) =

1947 novel by Dorothy B. Hughes

- First edition
- Author: Dorothy B. Hughes
- Genre: Mystery
- Publisher: Duell, Sloan and Pearce
- Publication date: 1947
- Publication place: United States

In a Lonely Place is a 1947 novel by mystery writer Dorothy B. Hughes. Nicholas Ray directed a classic film noir under the same title, starring Humphrey Bogart and Gloria Grahame, in 1950.

== Plot ==
The novel is told through the point of view of Dix Steele, a World War II veteran who opens the novel yearning for the sense of power that he felt while fighting overseas. The story opens as Dix, newly moved to Los Angeles, reunites with a wartime friend turned Los Angeles Police Department homicide detective, Brub Nicolai and meets his wife Sylvia, who Dix quickly decides is bland and uninteresting.

The next day, Dix meets Laurel after almost colliding with her outside his apartment. Laurel is a beautiful red-headed woman who, in this first meeting, is dismissive of Dix. He finds Laurel incredibly alluring and quickly seeks her out again as they begin a romantic relationship.

Some time later, Dix is talking with Brub who reveals that multiple women have been strangled in the city and that Brub is part of the team investigating the murders. The following Sunday, Dix reads an article about the most recent victim and it is confirmed to the reader that Dix is the serial strangler responsible for the murders.

The rest of the novel weaves together Dix's attacks on women, his intense and turbulent relationship with Laurel, and his underlying belief in his own ability to evade detection by Brub and the LAPD as their search for the strangler intensifies. Throughout the narrative, Dix's internal monologue reveals the depths of his own hatred and disgust for women, even while he believes his actions reflect none of this internal repulsion.

Some months later, after discovering evidence he believes proves Laurel has been seeing another man, Dix sees a figure outside his apartment who he recognises as Laurel and he goes to confront her. As he closes in on the woman, he realizes it was actually Sylvia dressed in Laurel's coat, who tells him she has never trusted him and that Laurel came to Sylvia and Brub for help escaping Dix. Dix goes into a rage, attempting to strangle Sylvia, but he is interrupted by Brub and several other LAPD officers who had been lying in wait.

It is revealed that Sylvia had planned the trap after suspecting Dix of being the strangler for some time and learning of his behavior towards Laurel. Dix is arrested and charged with the attempted murder of Sylvia and the murder of the strangled girls.

== Book to film ==
The film differs from the novel in several substantial ways. Mostly notably, in the film, despite being a violent man with a hot temper, Steele is innocent of the murder he's suspected of committing, and is sincere in his desire to be a successful screenwriter; in the novel, he is a misogynistic, sociopathic killer who claims to be a crime novel writer in order to sponge off of a wealthy uncle.

== Radio adaptations ==
Philip Morris Playhouse presented In a Lonely Place March 16, 1952. Joseph Cotten and University of Kansas student Mary Lou Jukes co-starred in the 30-minute adaptation.

Suspense presented In a Lonely Place March 6, 1948. Robert Montgomery and Lurene Tuttle starred in a one-hour adaptation of the full plot.
