= Bloodhounds of Broadway =

Bloodhounds of Broadway may refer to:

- "The Bloodhounds of Broadway", a short story by Damon Runyon first published in 1931
- The Bloodhounds of Broadway and other stories, a collection of Damon Runyon stories
- Bloodhounds of Broadway (1952 film), a film based on stories by Damon Runyon
- Bloodhounds of Broadway (1989 film), an unrelated film based on a different selection of stories by Damon Runyon
