= Dorothy B. Hughes =

American writer (1904–1993)

- Born: Dorothy Belle Flanagan; August 10, 1904; Kansas City, Missouri, U.S.
- Died: May 6, 1993 (aged 88); Ashland, Oregon, U.S.
- Education: University of Missouri
- Occupations: Writer; literary critic
- Children: 3
- Writing career
- Language: English
- Genres: Crime fiction, literary criticism

Dorothy B. Hughes (August 10, 1904 – May 6, 1993) was an American crime writer, literary critic, and historian. Hughes wrote fourteen crime and detective novels, primarily in the hardboiled and noir styles, and is best known for the novels In a Lonely Place (1947) and Ride the Pink Horse (1946).

== Early life ==
Born Dorothy Belle Flanagan in Kansas City, Missouri, she was the oldest child of Frank S. Flanagan and Calla Belle Callahan. She knew she wanted to be a writer when she first learned to read at the age of 6. She studied journalism and after graduating from the University of Missouri with a B.J. degree in 1924 worked in that field in Missouri, New Mexico, and New York, including work for the Olean [NY] Times for two years. She did graduate work in journalism at the University of New Mexico and at Columbia University without receiving degrees from either institution. In March 1932, she married Levi Allen Hughes III in Santa Fe, NM.

== Career ==
Hughes's first published book, Dark Certainty (1931), a volume of poetry, won the Yale Series of Younger Poets Competition.

In 1940, she published her first mystery novel, The So Blue Marble. She published eight more mystery novels in the 1940s. She also wrote a history of the University of New Mexico and a critical study of writer Erle Stanley Gardner. In 1951 she received an Edgar Award from the Mystery Writers of America in the category of Outstanding Mystery Criticism, and in 1978 she was given the MWA's Grand Master award.

Hughes acknowledged the influence of such writers as Eric Ambler, Graham Greene, and William Faulkner. Her writing style and suspenseful plots exemplify the hardboiled genre of crime and detective novels, and her literary career associates her with other female crime writers of the 1940s and 1950s, such as Margaret Millar, Vera Caspary, Elisabeth Sanxay Holding, and Olive Higgins Prouty. In his afterword to a reissue of her last novel, The Expendable Man (1963), Walter Mosley wrote that her fiction "captures an unease under the skin of everyday life in a way that is all her own."

Hughes was a successful writer and popular during her day. Three of her novels were made into feature films: The Fallen Sparrow (1943), starring John Garfield; In a Lonely Place (1950), directed by Nicholas Ray and starring Humphrey Bogart; and Ride the Pink Horse (1947), directed by and starring Robert Montgomery, which was remade for television in 1964 as The Hanged Man. Hughes made her home in Santa Fe, New Mexico, which she used as the setting of several novels. During the 1960s She returned to Santa Fe, New Mexico, after the death of her mother in 1961. She published her final novel The Expendable Man in 1963.

From 1940 to 1979 she reviewed mysteries for The Albuquerque Tribune, the Los Angeles Times, the New York Herald-Tribune and other newspapers. Over the course of her career, she wrote a total of fourteen novels, the majority of which were published between 1940 and 1952.

== Death ==
Hughes died on May 6, 1993, in Ashland, Oregon, from complications following a stroke.

== Works ==
=== Books ===
- Pueblo on the Mesa: The First Fifty Years of the University of New Mexico (1939)
- The So Blue Marble (1940) – her first novel
- The Cross-Eyed Bear (1940) – later published as The Cross-Eyed Bear Murders
- The Bamboo Blonde (1941) – sequel to The So Blue Marble
- The Fallen Sparrow (1942) – filmed in 1943
- The Blackbirder (1943)
- The Delicate Ape (1944)
- Johnnie (1944)
- Dread Journey (1945)
- Ride the Pink Horse (1946) – filmed in 1947; Robert Montgomery Presents TV series, "Ride the Pink Horse" episode, 1950, remade in 1964 as The Hanged Man
- The Scarlet Imperial (1946) – also published as Kiss for a Killer
- In a Lonely Place (1947) – filmed in 1950
- The Big Barbecue (1949)
- The Candy Kid (1950) – Climax TV series, "Spider Web" episode in 1958
- The Davidian Report (1952) – also published as The Body on the Bench, 1952; Robert Montgomery Presents TV series, "The Davidian Report" episode, 1952
- The Expendable Man (1963) – republished by Persephone Books, 2006. Edgar Award nominee, Best Novel.
- Erle Stanley Gardner: The Case of the Real Perry Mason (1978) – critical biography. Edgar Award nominee, Best Critical/Biographical Work

=== Play ===
"The Fiesta of White Waters" [as Dorothy Belle Flanagan]. Schubert Theater, Kansas City, MO, May 2, 1929.

=== Poetry ===
[as Dorothy Belle Flanagan]

- "Absurd Child." The Bookman, February 1928, p. 641.
- "All the Day Long." Commonweal, February 1, 1928, p. 1013.
- "Ancestors." The Anniston [AL] Star, Dec. 6, 1935, p. 5.
- "Belinda." Alton [IL] Evening Telegraph, Aug 29, 1929, p. 4.
- "Betrothal." The Sanford [FL] Herald, December 4, 1928, p. 4.
- "Brave Lady." New York Times, March 26, 1929, p. 29.
- "Bride Vigil." The Charleston [WV] Daily Mail, August 19, 1928, p. 6.
- "Concerning Gardens." New York Times, January 26, 1929, p. 10.
- "Confession (in a Moment of Despair)." Meriden [CT] Record, January 14, 1931, p. 6.
- "Curse." "The Conning Tower" by F.P.A. [Franklin Pierce Adams], New York Herald Tribune. Rpt. Oakland Tribune, June 10, 1931, p. 21.
- Dark Certainty. Poetry collection, 1931.
- "Dissertation on the Morning Hours." Cortland [NY] Standard, March 7, 1930, p. 2.
- "Down South." Contemporary Verse, February 1929, pp. 2–3.
- "Fashion Hints for Fall." Altoona [PA] Mirror, October 8, 1928, p. 8.
- "First Communion." Contemporary Verse, October/November 1928, p. 29.
- "For Antony." New York Sun, April 14, 1937, p.
- "For a Young Daughter." New York Times, February 12, 1933, p. 64.
- "Gabrielle to Her Zither." The American Literary Assn Anthology, 1927, p. 46.
- "Heartbreak." The Poets of the Future: A College Anthology for 1924-25, 1925, p. 106.
- "I Miss You So." Fairfield [IA] Daily Ledger, October 19, 1934, p. 4.
- "Intruder." New York Times, June 30, 1928, p. 9.
- "Just Trying to Get Along." Ottawa Citizen, May 27, 1929, p. 27.
- "Lullaby from a Stable." South New Berlin [NY] Bee, 14 December 1929, p. 7.
- "Miss Carrie—Spinster." Farmer's Wife, May 1, 1929, p. 70.
- "New England Soil." The Conning Tower by F.P.A., New York Herald Tribune. Rpt. Oakland Tribune, July 15, 1931, p. 23.
- "Prayer for Fidelity." Spartanburg [SC] Herald, March 13, 1929, p. 2.
- "Purity." Decatur [IL] Herald, August 5, 1928, p. 6.
- "References." The Southeast Missourian, December 27, 1930, p. 4.
- "Sea Wife." New York Times, July 17, 1929, p. 15.
- "A Slattern." Altoona [PA] Mirror, November 21, 1930, p. 8.
- "Summer Romance." The American Literary Assn Anthology, 1927, p. 46.
- "To a Half-God." Overland Monthly and Out West Magazine, October 1927, p. 306.
- "To One Quite Faithful." Cortland [NY] Standard, July 20, 1931, p. 2.
- "Vespers." Commonweal, 1929. Rpt. Catholic Courier and Journal, August 23, 1929, p. 4.
- "Witch Look." Contemporary Verse, April/May 1928, p. 16.

=== Radio ===
"The Turquoise Ring Murders" [radio serial by Dorothy Belle Flanagan]. New Mexico Radio Station, Griffin Electric Co., Oct. 1933.

=== Short stories ===
- "Brave Guy" [as Dorothy Belle Flanagan]. The Midland, September/October 1928.
- "The Candy Kid." Collier's, May 20-June 24, 1950.
- "Cristemasse Is Forever." Santa Clues, 1993.
- "Danger at Deerfawn." Ellery Queen's Mystery Magazine, August 1964.
- "Everybody Needs a Mink." The Saint [UK] Mystery Magazine, June 1965.
- "The Homecoming." Murder Cavalcade, 1946.
- "Horatio Ruminates." Cat Crimes, 1991.
- "It Couldn't Possibly Happen." The American Magazine, March 1945.
- "Judith Picks a Water Lily" [as Dorothy Belle Flanagan]. Complete Love Novel Magazine, August 1930.
- "Nigger Blues" [as Dorothy Belle Flanagan] New Copy, ed. Donald Lemen Clark, Columbia UP, 1931. Repr. as "Black and White Blues" [as Dorothy B. Hughes], Chase, January 1964.
- "Sherlock Holmes and the Muffin." The New Adventures of Sherlock Holmes, 1987.
- "Summer Is for Loving." Cosmopolitan, July 1961.
- "Wedding" [as Dorothy Belle Flanagan]. The New Yorker, February 21, 1931.
- "Wintry Wedding." McCall's, September 1940.
- "You Killed Miranda." The Saint Detective Magazine, August 1958.
