= The Bloodhound Mysteries =

Novel series

- Country: England
- Language: English
- Genre: Crime fiction, detective fiction
- Publisher: Boardman Books
- Published: 1948-1967
- Media type: Print

The Bloodhound Mysteries is a novel series published by the London firm of T.V. Boardman Ltd. (Boardman Books) between 1948 and 1967. There were two sub-series, American Bloodhound Mysteries and British Bloodhound Mysteries. Both series saw the original hardcover editions of many important works of detective and crime fiction. British artist Denis McLoughlin served as art director for Boardman Books and provided many of the dust jacket illustrations.
