= Boardman Books =

British publishing company

- Parent company: T.V. Boardman, Ltd.
- Status: defunct (1967)
- Founded: 1930s
- Founder: Thomas Volney Boardman
- Country of origin: United Kingdom
- Headquarters location: London
- Key people: Denis McLoughlin
- Publication types: Books, Pulp magazines, Comic books (1937–1961)
- Fiction genres: mystery, fantasy, science fiction
- Imprints: Popular Press; Rotogravure

T.V. Boardman, Ltd. (Boardman Books) was a London publishing house that turned out both paperback and hardcover books, pulp magazines, and comic books. Founded by Thomas Volney Boardman in the 1930s, Boardman Books is best known for publishing the long-running monthly series of hardcover Bloodhound Mysteries, most with jacket illustrations by Denis McLoughlin. Boardman's Best American Detective Stories of the Year series is thought by some scholars of the genre to be the best collection of hard-boiled fiction ever published. Boardman published the first British hardcover edition of Robert E. Howard's The Coming of Conan as well as other titles originated by Gnome Press in the United States. Besides mystery, fantasy, and science fiction, Boardman Books published other genres of fiction and nonfiction.

== History ==
Boardman pioneered British reprinting of American comics. During the week of 16 October 1937, the first issue of a Boardman tabloid comic in the traditional British format, Okay Comics Weekly, arrived at newsagent's all over England. The content was mostly American newspaper strips and the first issue sported a cover strip by Will Eisner. Okay lasted only until April 1938, or a total of less than thirty issues. At about this same time, other British publishers experimented with reprinting American comics and imports of the real thing began to land on British shores. It rapidly became apparent that a significant British market for American comic books existed.

However, the British declaration of war on Germany on 3 September 1939, immediately halted the official importation of American comics into the United Kingdom although masses of American comics intended for G.I.s began arriving in 1942. Already with a taste for American comics, Thomas Volney Boardman, Sr., made an arrangement with Everett M. "Busy" Arnold of Quality Comics to produce British editions of two titles, Feature Comics (#29–33) and Smash Comics (#7–11), all appearing in 1940–1941. Because Boardman needed low-priced titles to please his primary outlet, Woolworth's Department Stores, the British editions reprinted only about half the content of the American originals. To use the rest of the pages, Boardman created two additional corresponding titles in the American style, Super Funnies (#29–33) and Mystery Comics (#7–11).

After World War II, Boardman continued comic book production with a series of monthly comics produced by rotogravure and priced at a modest 3 pence. In the late-1940s, they introduced a number of children's annuals under their Popular Press line, intended primarily for the Christmas market and sold almost exclusively through the Woolworth's department store chain. These annuals contained a mixture of text and comic strip stories. Some were original British creations while others were reprinted from Quality Comics. In the late 1950s, increased competition with now legal American comic book imports caused Boardman to drop their comics annual line. The last, Buffalo Bill True West Annual saw print in 1961.

The firm ceased operations entirely in 1967, although the Bloodhound Mystery line continued for several years from other publishers. The Bloodhound Mystery authors included Drew (Droo) Launay, who wrote the Detective Adam Flute novels:

- She Modelled Her Coffin
- The New Shining White Murder
- A Corpse in Camera
- Death and Still Life
- The Two Way Mirror
- The Scream

== Comic book titles ==
=== Original titles ===
- Annuals (mixture of original stories and reprints of Quality Comics material):
  - Buffalo Bill Wild West Annual (12 issues, Christmas 1949–1960)
  - Super Coloured Comic Annual (3 issues, 1949–1951)
  - Ajax Adventure Annual (1 issue, Christmas 1952) – 192 pp.
  - Adventure Annual (1 issue, Christmas 1953) – 192 pp.
  - New Spaceways Comic Annual (1 issue, Christmas 1954) – 192 pp.
  - Okay Adventure Annual (3 issues, 1955–1957)
  - Okay Annual of Adventure Stories (2 issues, 1958–1959)
  - First Book of Heroes (1960) – no comics content
- Buffalo Bill (17 issues, 1948–1954)
- Buffalo Bill True West Annual (1 issue, 1961)
- The Lone Rider (1 issue, 1950)
- Mystery Comics (5 issues, 1940–1941)
- Roy Carson (8 issues, February 1948 – February 1951)
- Roy Carson Comic (2 issues, January 1953 – 1954)
- Spaceways Comic (1 issue, November 1953)
- Super Funnies (5 issues, 1940–1941)
- Swift Morgan (7 issues, March 1948 – April 1951)
- Swift Morgan Space Comic (2 issues, March–November 1953)

=== Reprint titles ===
from Quality Comics, unless otherwise noted

- Blackhawk (16 issues, Jan. 1949–1951)
- Buccaneers (1 issue, May 1951)
- Captain Midnight (1 issue, 1946) – reprinted from Dell Comics
- Crack Western (3 issues, 1948–1954)
- Doll Man (1 issue, 1951)
- Feature Comics (5 issues, 1940–1941)
- Okay Comics Weekly (20 issues, 16 October 1937 – 16 February 1938)
- Plastic Man (4 issues, 1954)
- Smash Comics (6 issues, 1940–1941)
- The Spirit (2 issues, February–July 1949)

== Sources ==
- Gore, Matthew H. "Collector's Corner: Denis McLoughlin", Goldenage Treasury Volume One. AC Comics: Longwood, Florida, 2003. Unpaginated.
- Hertzberg, Francis. Denis McLoughlin: The Master of Light & Shade. Gryphon Books: Brooklyn, New York, 1995.
- Holland, Steve. "The Lancashire Cowboy and the Bloodhound: The Art of Denis McLoughlin", Paperback Parade #24 (June 1991), 60–62.
- Holland, Steve. The Mushroom Jungle. Zeon Books: Dilton Marsh, England, 1993.
- Lesser, Thomas M. "The Boardman Hardcovers", Paperback Parade #38 (April 1994), 21–44.
