= Duell, Sloan and Pearce =

- Founded: 1939
- Founders: C. Halliwell Duell; Samuel Sloan; Charles A. Pearce
- Defunct: 1967
- Country of origin: United States
- Headquarters location: New York City
- Fiction genres: Fiction, non-fiction

Duell, Sloan and Pearce was a publishing company located in New York City and was founded in 1939 by C. Halliwell Duell, Samuel Sloan and Charles A. Pearce. It initially published general fiction and non-fiction, but not light romances, westerns or children's books. It published works by many prominent authors, including Archibald MacLeish, John O'Hara, Erskine Caldwell, Anaïs Nin, Conrad Aiken, Wallace Stegner, E. E. Cummings, Howard Fast and Benjamin Spock.

Duell, Sloan and Pearce soon became sales agent for Musette Publishers, which had a line of children's books. The firm also published photographic essays, including the U.S. Camera annuals. U.S. Camera 1941 was banned in Boston because it contained photographs of nudes. In 1942 the firm agreed to handle all advertising, promotion, selling and distribution of Eagle Books titles and later added the Essential Books and Bloodhound Mysteries divisions. In 1947 they introduced the New American Naturalist series, which was intended to provided a comprehensive survey of American flora and fauna for the general reader. Arrowhead Books was later added as an independent subsidiary of Duell, Sloan and Pearce.

In 1951 Duell, Sloan and Pearce entered into an agreement with Little, Brown and Company for Little, Brown to handle the manufacturing, warehousing, promotion and selling of all Duell, Sloan and Pearce titles. The two firms remained independent, but the books carried both imprints. The "working alliance" was in the form of a 30-year contract. In 1956, Duell, Sloan and Pearce terminated the arrangement with Little, Brown, and joined the McKay Group, a cooperative selling and manufacturing association in New York. In March 1961 Duell, Sloan and Pearce became an affiliate of Meredith Publishing Company. In 1967 Meredith announced that all affiliated imprints, including Duell, Sloan and Pearce, would no longer be used.
