= Veronica Ruzicka =

American designer

- Born: September 29, 1917; New York, New York, U.S.
- Died: October 12, 1981 (age 64); Hanover, New Hampshire, U.S.
- Other name: Veronica Laing
- Occupations: Illustrator, designer, artist
- Spouse: Alexander Laing m. 1961
- Father: Rudolph Ruzicka

Veronica Ruzicka Laing (September 29, 1917 – October 12, 1981) was an American artist, designer, mapmaker, and illustrator.

== Early life and education ==
Ruzicka was born in New York City, the daughter of typographer and artist Rudolph Ruzicka and Filomena Sprova Ruzicka. Both of her parents were immigrants from Bohemia. She graduated from Barnard College in 1939, with further studies at the Grand Central School of Art, Columbia University, and New York University. She trained in military cartography during World War II. She studied decorative papermaking with Rosamond B. Loring in Boston.

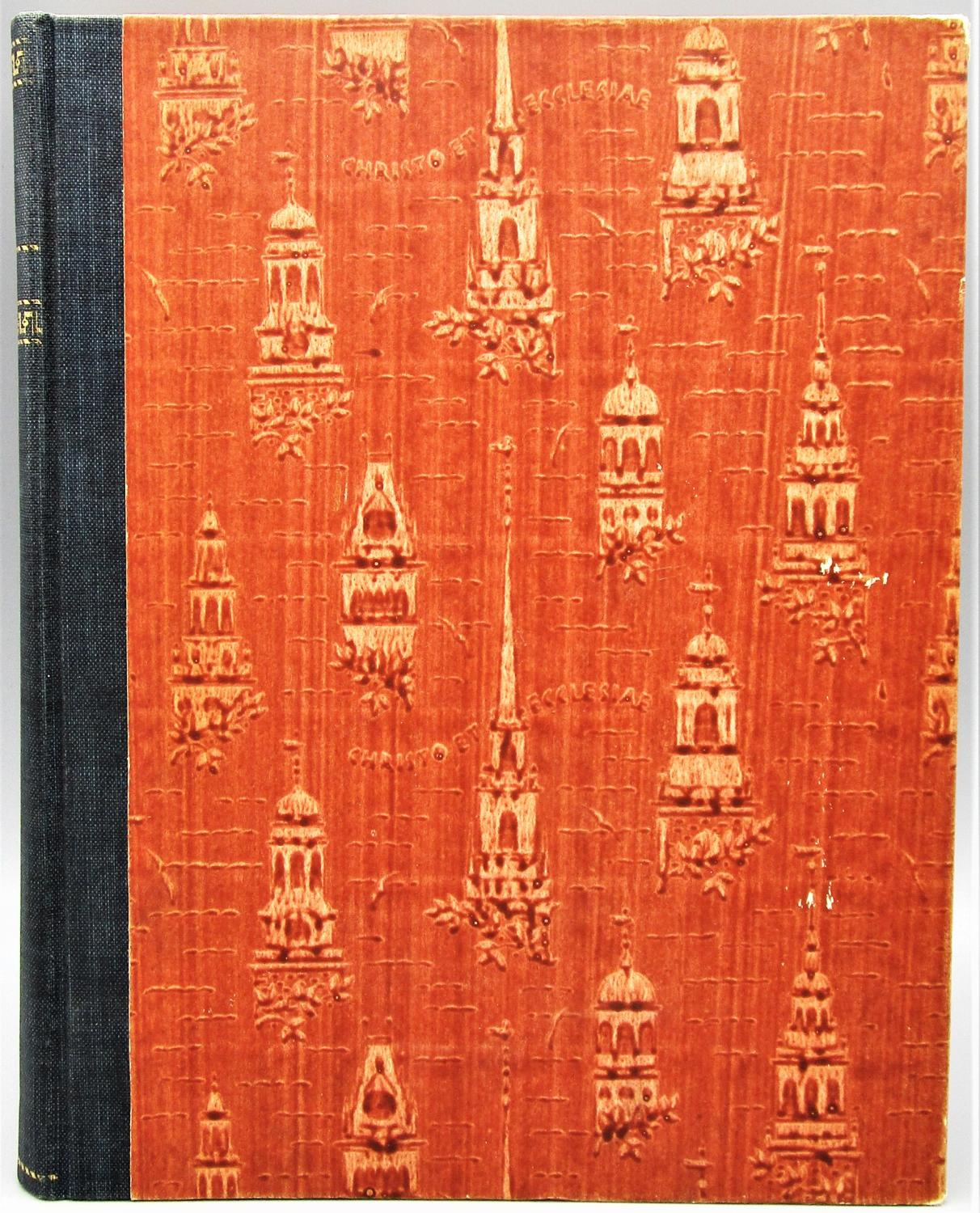
Handmade paste paper by Ruzicka, used to cover Loring's Decorated Book Papers (1942)

== Career ==
Ruzicka made maps, illustrations, and decorative endpapers for books including Loring's Decorated Book Papers (1942), Robert Frost's A Witness Tree (1942), Ruth Hornblower Churchill's The Home Bible (1951), Alexander Laing's Clipper Ships and their Makers (1966), and The Adams Papers.

== Personal life and legacy ==
Ruzicka married writer Alexander Kinnan Laing in 1961. Her husband died in a bicycle accident in 1976, and she died from cancer in 1981, at the age of 64, in Hanover, New Hampshire.

There is a large collection of Ruzicka's papers, including original artwork, maps, clippings, correspondence, and photographs, at Dartmouth College Libraries. Her works have been in exhibits at the University of Chicago Library and the Houghton Library.
