= Ralph Hornblower III =

American opera singer and businessman

Ray Hornblower
- Born: Ralph Hornblower III; March 17, 1948 (age 78)
- Education: Harvard University; University of Virginia Law School
- Spouses: Margot Roosevelt (m. 1969; div. 2000) Cynthia Morgan Edmunds (after 2004)
- Parent(s): Ralph Hornblower Jr. Priscilla Blumer
- Relatives: Henry Hornblower (great-grandfather); Ralph Hornblower (grandfather)

Ralph "Ray" Hornblower III (born March 17, 1948) is an American opera singer and chairman of Hornblower & Company, LLC, an investment firm specializing in early stage companies in the biomedical, alternative energy, health care, and transportation/logistics sectors.

== Early life ==
Hornblower was born on March 17, 1948. He was the son of Ralph Hornblower Jr. and Priscilla (née Blumer) Hornblower. He is the great-grandson of Henry Hornblower, the founder of Hornblower & Weeks. His grandfather and father were in their turn partners in that firm. Although the present firm of Hornblower & Company is not a descendant firm, the right to the name Hornblower passed, by the original Hornblower & Weeks partnership agreement, to Ralph Hornblower, thence to Ralph, Jr., and to Ralph III.

Hornblower graduated in 1970 from Harvard where he was elected to the Owl Club. Hornblower was a left halfback for the Crimson football team, and earned designation as an All-Ivy League second team member in 1968. Hornblower played in the Harvard wins 29-29 contest versus Yale. Hornblower obtained a Juris Doctor degree in 1974 from the University of Virginia Law School.

== Career ==
Following his graduation from law school, Hornblower joined the U.S. Department of Justice in 1974, first working as a trial attorney in the Special Litigation Section of the Department's Civil Rights Division. Subsequently, in the post-Watergate period under Attorneys General Edward Levi and Griffin Bell, he was assigned to oversee all matters of ethics and professional responsibility in the Justice Department.

=== Opera singer ===
Leaving the Justice Department in 1980, and after spending one year in private practice, Hornblower began a second career as a professional concert and opera singer by spending six years in Paris and while overseas was house tenor for the Bulgarian National Opera. As a tenor, he performed principal roles in Turandot and Carmen at Opera Pacific in Costa Mesa, California and at opera festivals in Aix-en-Provence, France, and Buxton, England.

Hornblower was a member of the board of overseers of Plimoth Plantation, the living history museum in Plymouth, Mass., that was founded by his uncle, Henry Hornblower II.

== Personal life ==
Between 1969 and 2000, Hornblower was married to Margot Roosevelt (b. 1950), great-granddaughter of U.S. president Theodore Roosevelt. They divorced in 2000, and had two sons. In 2004, he married Cynthia Morgan Edmunds, executive editor of Bride's magazine. They have one daughter.
