= Ruth Hornblower Churchill =

American educator

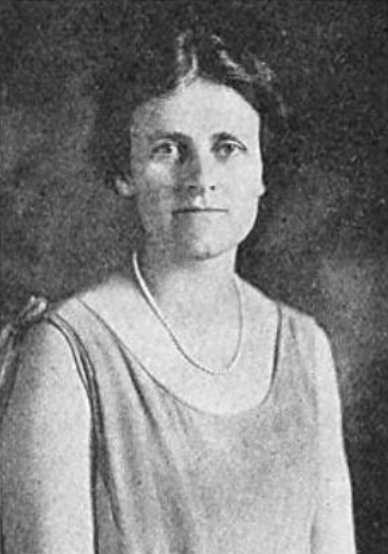
- Churchill, from a 1929 publication
- Born: Ruth Hornblower; April 18, 1887; Arlington, Massachusetts, U.S.
- Died: July 9, 1970 (aged 83); Arlington, Massachusetts, U.S.
- Other names: Ruth Hornblower Atkins, Ruth Hornblower Greenough
- Occupations: Educator, writer
- Spouse(s): Robert W. Atkins; Chester Noyes Greenough; Lawrence Whitfield Churchill
- Father: Henry Hornblower
- Relatives: Ralph Hornblower (brother)

Ruth Hornblower Atkins Greenough Churchill (April 18, 1887 – July 9, 1970) was an American educator, clubwoman, and writer. She published a children's editiion of the King James Bible with illustrations by William Blake and Rudolph Ruzicka.

== Early life and education ==
Hornblower was born in Arlington, Massachusetts, the daughter of banker Henry Hornblower and Harriet Frances Wood Hornblower. She graduated from Vassar College in 1908.

== Career ==
Churchill was a member of the Boston Community Nursing Association from 1911 to 1916, and taught kindergarten in Cuba during the winters of those years, because her first husband operated sugar mills there. During World War I she managed Belmont's community kitchen program.

Churchill was a teacher, overseer, and treasurer at Shady Hill School in Cambridge, Massachusetts in the 1920s. In 1936, she co-founded the Harvard Arlington Guidance Study with her second husband, Harvard professor Chester Noyes Greenough. She was a trustee of Vassar College, Sarah Lawrence College, and Simmons College.

== Publications ==
Hornblower published a children's edition of the King James version of the Bible in 1951, based on her family's favorite readings and William Blake illustrations. It included decorations by Rudolph Ruzicka, and maps by Veronica Ruzicka. A copy of The Home Bible was presented to Queen Elizabeth the Queen Mother in 1956, to mark Blake's bicentennial.

- Chester Noyes Greenough: Teacher, Dean, Master, Scholar (1940)
- The Home Bible: Arranged for Family Reading (1951, arranged by Ruth Hornblower Greenough, with illustrations by William Blake)
- Mother's Chronicles (1966, memoirs, privately printed in 2 volumes)

== Personal life and legacy ==
Hornblower married three times. She was married to Robert Wrisley Atkins from 1910 until they divorced; they had five children. She married Harvard English professor Chester Noyes Greenough in 1931; he died in 1938. Her third husband was Lawrence Whitfield Churchill; they married in 1953 and he died in 1959. She died in 1970, at the age of 83.

There is a box of her papers at Vassar College, and one of her scrapbooks in the Arlington Historical Society. She left her home and 26-acre estate in Belmont for the purpose of environmental education. It was acquired by the Massachusetts Audubon Society in 1994, and became part of a nature preserve.
