= Fanwood =

Fanwood may refer to:

- Fanwood, New Jersey, a borough in Union County, New Jersey
- Fanwood Activity Centre, a Scout camp in the Spen Valley, part of Scouting in Yorkshire and the Humber
- Fanwood, the codename for the Itanium 2 64-bit Intel microprocessor
- Fanwood (typeface), a FOSS version of Fairfield (typeface)
