= Henry Hornblower =

American investment banker

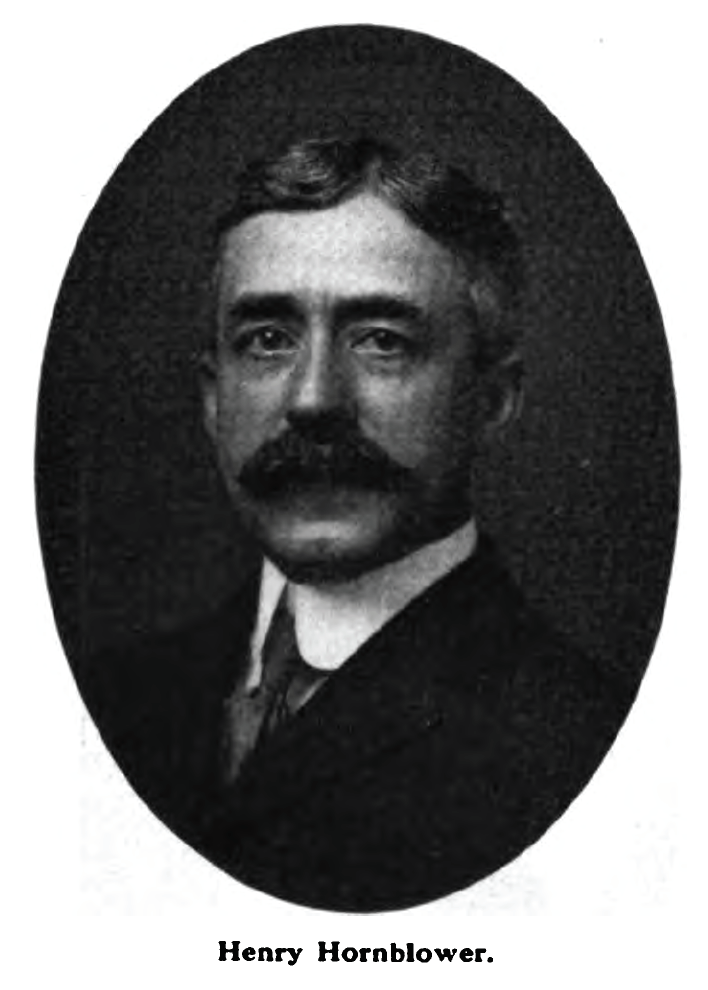
- Born: June 8, 1863; Lawrence, Massachusetts, U.S.
- Died: April 1, 1941 (aged 77); Pinehurst, North Carolina, U.S.
- Occupations: Entrepreneur, banker
- Spouse: Harriet Frances Wood (m. 1886)
- Parent(s): Edward Thomas Hornblower; Martha Boyd Whiting

Henry Hornblower (June 8, 1863 – April 1, 1941) was a prominent American investment banker and founder of the firm of Hornblower & Weeks.

== Early life ==
Hornblower was born in Lawrence, Massachusetts on June 8, 1863. He was a son of Edward Thomas (1828–1901) and Martha Boyd (née Whiting) Hornblower (1824–1873). He came from a distinguished family. Reportedly, "the name of 'Hornblower' is one of the features of Boston and the old Bay State. It is a name that has flourished through generations... The line of Hornblowers in Boston and New England has been an honorable one as far back as family prestige can be traced."

He graduated from the Cotting High School of Arlington, Massachusetts in 1878.

== Career ==
In 1879, Hornblower started his career by entering his father's financial business, Hornblower and Page.

In 1888, Henry Hornblower and John W. Weeks (later U.S. Secretary of War under Warren G. Harding) formed a partnership which in time became a financial power in this part of the country. Hornblower was a member of the governing committee of the Boston Stock Exchange and its president in 1911-1912. Among the corporations of which he was a director were the First National Corporation, the First National Bank of Boston, the Hoosac Mills, the New England Power Association, the Bangor and Aroostook Railroad, and the Boston Five Cents Savings Bank. He remained active in some of these after his retirement from the firm of Hornblower & Weeks in 1936.

== Personal life ==
On May 12, 1886, Hornblower married Harriet Frances "Hattie" Wood (1864–1955) of Arlington, where they lived for thirty-six years. In 1922, they moved to 89 Mt. Vernon Street in Boston. Together, they were the parents of:

- Ruth Hornblower (1887–1970), who married Robert Wrisley Atkins (1889–1948) in 1910. They divorced in 1927 and she married Chester Noyes Greenough (1874–1938) in 1931. After his death, she married Lawrence Whitfield Churchill (1885–1959) in 1953.
- Helen Hornblower (1889–1986), who married Alfred Reuben Meyer (1888–1962).
- Ralph Hornblower (1891–1960), who married Eleanor Greenwood (1896–1983).

Hornblower was a member of the Algonquin Club, Exchange Club, Union Club, and Boston City Club, of the Boston Art Club, and of the Brookline Country Club. Amateur athletics attracted him and led him to serve as treasurer of the New England Olympic Club in 1912. Unostentatiously he supported good causes such as the North American Civic League for Immigrants, of which he was a trustee.

He died of a heart attack, after a round of golf with friend Donald Ross, at Pinehurst, North Carolina on April 11, 1941.

Henry Hornblower was a member of The Tin Whistles.

His grandson, Henry Hornblower II, founded Plimoth Plantation, the living history museum in Plymouth, Massachusetts in 1947.
