= Margot Roosevelt =

American journalist (born 1950)

- Born: Margot Roosevelt Barmine; August 13, 1950 (age 76)
- Other name: Margot Hornblower
- Education: Lycée Français de New York
- Alma mater: Harvard University
- Occupation: Journalist
- Spouse: Ralph Hornblower III (m. 1969; div. 2000)
- Children: 2
- Parent(s): Edith Kermit Roosevelt; Alexander Gregory Barmine
- Relatives: See Roosevelt family

Margot Roosevelt (born Margot Roosevelt Barmine; August 13, 1950) is an American journalist who covers economic and labor news for the Los Angeles Times. She is a great-granddaughter of President Theodore Roosevelt.

== Early life ==
Roosevelt is the daughter of Edith Kermit Roosevelt and Alexander Gregory Barmine; Roosevelt's maternal grandfather is Archibald Roosevelt, a son of U.S. President Theodore Roosevelt.

She was educated at the Lycée Français de New York and the École Française Internationale in Washington, D.C. Roosevelt also attended the University of Madrid, Spain and the University of Dallas in Irving, Texas. She graduated from Harvard University (Radcliffe College) with a degree in history.

== Career ==
Roosevelt's first newspaper job was at the Charlottesville Daily Progress in Virginia. She was also a staff correspondent of the Washington Post for 13 years, during which time she was chief environmental correspondent for three years, congressional correspondent in Washington, D.C. for three years, and New York bureau chief for four years. She joined Time magazine in 1987, reporting from Time's Paris bureau from 1988 to 1994, when she moved to Los Angeles as National Correspondent for Time.

In 2007, Roosevelt joined the Los Angeles Times as an environmental reporter. She was a 2010 National Center for Atmospheric Research Journalism Fellow and 2010 Climate Media Fellow of the Earth Journalism Network. In 2011, Roosevelt received the award for "Distinguished Science Journalism in The Atmospheric and Related Sciences" from the American Meteorological Society.

Starting in 2012, Roosevelt covered economic news and the Southern California economy for the Orange County Register. She returned to the L.A. Times in 2018.

== Personal life ==
In 1969, she was married to Ralph Hornblower III. Before their divorce in 2000, she was known as Margot Hornblower. They have two sons.

Roosevelt lived in Sherman Oaks, California in 2009.
