= Alexander Laing (American writer) =

Alexander Kinnan Laing (August 7, 1903 – April 23, 1976) was a poet, novelist, writer and compiler of sea stories, and professor. He spent his career at Dartmouth College, where he also studied.

== Life and career ==
Laing dropped out of Dartmouth in 1925 and spent two years at sea, an experience that informed much of his later work. He served on the SS Leviathan, a German-built passenger liner that had been seized by the United States in 1917. On the Leviathan, he sailed to Southampton and, later, to Los Angeles via the Panama Canal. He retained his affection for the sea, using a Guggenheim Fellowship in 1934 to sail around the world via Europe, the Suez Canal, Singapore, Hong Kong, Japan, and Hawaii.

After his return to Dartmouth, he won the Walt Whitman Prize for Poetry in 1929. He later served in a variety of positions at the college, including Advisor to the Arts, Assistant Librarian, and Lecturer and Professor of English. One of his most prominent roles was his leadership in the Dartmouth Writing Clinic, which he futilely attempted to save from elimination in 1959.

Laing married three times. His first wife was Isabel Lattimore, his second, the poet Dilys Laing, with whom he had one son, David Bennet Laing. His third wife, Veronica, was the daughter of the illustrator Rudolph Ruzicka. He died as the result of a bicycle accident at the age of 72.

== Writing ==
Laing's most successful book was The Cadaver of Gideon Wyck, described as an "unexpected sensation" featuring "ghoulish subject matter—including abortions, babies born with fused lower limbs, an epileptic murderer, and a woman driven mad by sadistic research experiments." His 1933 book The Sea Witch, by contrast, is a historical novel set on board a mid-nineteenth-century clipper ship and featuring a mutiny by the ship's cargo of coolie laborers. These books are representative of Laing's enormously diverse literary output, which included both fiction and nonfiction informed by his days at sea, poetry for The New Yorker and many other prominent literary magazines, and reviews of serious contemporary poetry and drama noted decades later for their balanced acknowledgment of experimental and political strains in literature of the period. Laing was also a co-founder of a newsletter opposed to the Vietnam War called American Voters Betrayed By Johnson, which eventually evolved into the left-wing political journal Groundswell Quarterly.

== Works ==
- Fool's Errand. Garden City, New York: Doubleday, Dorand, and Company, 1928. OCLC 1728635
- End of Roaming. New York: Farrar and Rinehart, 1930. OCLC 1192722
- The Cadaver of Gideon Wyck. New York: Farrar and Rinehart, 1934. OCLC 2220050
- The Motives of Nicholas Holtz. New York: Farrar and Rinehart, 1936. OCLC 2590263
- The Methods of Dr. Scarlett. New York: Farrar and Rinehart, 1937. OCLC 1693483
- Way for America. New York: Duell, Sloan, and Pearce, 1943. OCLC 1699923
- The Sea Witch. New York: Murray Hill Books, 1944. OCLC 1827269
- Clipper Ship Men. Garden City, New York: Garden City Publishing, 1950. OCLC 2327554
- Jonathan Eagle: Sea Stories. New York: Bantam, 1957. OCLC 3624662
- Matthew Early: A Novel. New York: Duell, Sloan, and Pearce, 1957. OCLC 1687769
- American Sail: A Pictorial History. New York: Dutton, 1961. OCLC 2581331
- Clipper Ships and their Makers. New York: Bonanza Books, 1966. OCLC 711738
- American Ships. New York: American Heritage Press, 1971. ISBN 007035846X
- The American Heritage History of Seafaring America. New York: American Heritage Publishing, 1974. ISBN 9780070358478
- Brant Point: Poems. Hanover, New Hampshire: University Press of New England, 1975. ISBN 0874511143
