= Alexander Gregory Barmine =

Soviet officer and dissident (1899–1987)

- Born: Alexander Grigoryevich Barmin; August 16, 1899; Mogilev, Russian Empire
- Died: December 25, 1987 (aged 88); Rockville, Maryland, U.S.
- Other name: Alexander Barmine
- Occupations: Diplomat, spy, propagandist
- Employer(s): Soviet GRU, US VOA, USIA
- Known for: Defection
- Spouses: Olga Federovna; Edith Kermit Roosevelt (m. 1948; div. 1952): Halyna Barmine
- Children: 5, including Margot Roosevelt
- Relatives: Theodore Roosevelt (grandfather-in-law)

Alexander Grigoryevich Barmin (Russian: Александр Григорьевич Бармин, romanized: Aleksandr Grigoryevich Barmin; August 16, 1899 – December 25, 1987), commonly known as Alexander Barmine, was an officer in the Soviet Army and diplomat who fled the purges of the Joseph Stalin era for France and then the United States, where he served the US government (including the OSS, VOA, and USIA) and also testified before congressional committees (including the SISS).

== Background ==
Alexander Grigoryevich Barmin was born on August 16, 1899, in Mogilev, Mogilev Governorate, Russian Empire (now Belarus). His father, whose surname was originally Graff, was a teacher and came from an ethnic German colonist family, while Alexander's mother was Ukrainian.

Barmine was educated at a state gymnasium in Kiev and St. Vladimir Imperial University. Barmine later attended the Infantry Officers' School in Minsk, the M. V. Frunze Military Academy in Moscow, and the Moscow Institute of Oriental Studies.

== Career ==
=== USSR government ===
In 1919, Barmine joined the Red Army and participated in the Russian Civil War that followed the Russian Revolution. Sent to a Red Army officer's academy, he served in several battles. In 1921, he served as a military attaché at the Soviet embassy in Bukhara.

By the age of 22, he had risen to the rank of brigadier general in the Red Army.

In 1935, Barmine was transferred from the Red Army to the Main Intelligence Directorate of the General Staff of the Soviet Armed Forces. In this capacity, he was assigned to work abroad under diplomatic cover for the Soviet Foreign Office and Trade Ministry Commissariat under various diplomatic and trade representative titles. Late in 1935, Barmine moved to Athens to take up an appointment as chargé d'affaires at the Soviet Embassy in Athens, Greece.

Barmine had been a protege, co-worker, subordinate, or confidant of many of the Soviet Union's leading generals, diplomats, and government officials who were arrested, imprisoned, and shot during the Great Purge under Stalin in the 1930s. When Barmine's immediate superiors in the military and diplomatic corps began to disappear, or were announced to have been arrested and shot, Barmine began to fear that a similar fate was in store for himself. In July 1937, after discovering co-workers rifling his desk and searching his offices in the dead of night, he received a letter from his 14-year-old son, Boris, who wrote that he, his brother, and Barmine's mother were going "far, far away to bathe in the sea." Boris also wrote:

Dear Papa, they read to us in school the sentence passed on the Trotskyist spies, Tukhachevsky, Yakir, Kork, Uborevich, and Feldman ... Wasn't it Feldman who used to live in our apartment house?

That same month, Barmine received an insistent invitation to dine aboard a Soviet ship, the Rudzutak, which suddenly docked at Piraeus (Athens's port) without prior notification to the Soviet legation. Barmine declined to go aboard but agreed to dine with the captain at a local restaurant, where he was strongly urged to return home. Constantly followed by NKVD agents, Barmine decided to defect to the West. He wrote in One Who Survived that "if I should be imprisoned as the result of some vile, lying charge ... [My family] would believe the official communiqué. Nobody would dare speak for me, and I would never be able to clear myself. I would lose them as sons forever."

=== Defection ===
Barmine fled Athens for Paris in 1937. It was at this time that Soviet agents assassinated the former chief of the Soviet intelligence service in Western Europe, Ignace Reiss. It was later revealed that the Soviet NKVD, under Nikolai Yezhov, spent 300,000 French francs to accomplish the "wet business".

In his 1952 memoir, Whittaker Chambers describes the impact of the defections and (in most cases) assassinations of fellow spies:

Suddenly, revolutionists with a lifetime of devoted activity would pop out, like rabbits from a burrow, with the G.P.U. close on their heels—Barmine from the Soviet legation in Athens, Raskolnikoff from the Soviet legation in Sofia, Krivitsky from Amsterdam, Reiss from Switzerland. Not that Reiss fled. Instead, a brave and a lonely man, he sent his single-handed defiance to Stalin: Murderer of the Kremlin cellars, I herewith return my decorations and resume my freedom of action. But defiance is not enough; cunning is needed to fight cunning. It was foredoomed that sooner or later the door of a G.P.U limousine would swing open and Reiss's body with the bullets in the defiant brain would tumble out—as happened shortly after he deserted. Of the four I have named, only Barmine outran the hunters.

=== USA government ===
In New York City, Barmine applied for political asylum and citizenship as one of the earliest high-ranking Soviet government defectors to the United States. In the days before the formation of the U.S. Central Intelligence Agency, Barmine does not appear to have been debriefed by the United States government about his extensive knowledge of Soviet leaders and policies.

In 1941, Barmine joined a U.S. Army anti-aircraft unit as a 42-year-old private soldier. In 1942, he obtained his U.S. citizenship. In 1943 and 1944, Barmine worked for the U.S. Office of Strategic Services, the wartime agency responsible for external intelligence and sabotage against Axis countries.

After a period of writing articles for various journals and publishing his second book in 1945, Barmine joined Voice of America in 1948, serving for sixteen years as chief of its Russian branch.

=== Testimony ===
On December 14, 1948, after an interview with Federal Bureau of Investigation agents, Barmine revealed that Soviet GRU Director Yan Karlovich Berzin had informed him before his 1937 defection that American professor and former Office of War Information director Owen Lattimore was a Soviet agent. In 1952, Barmine testified under oath before a Senate Subcommittee on Internal Security (the McCarran Committee) that he had been told by Soviet GRU Director Berzin that Lattimore was "one of our men".

In his memoirs, Barmine recounted how he and fellow members of the Soviet GRU were surprised to learn of the burgeoning support for Soviet communism among intellectuals in the Western democracies after the release of Soviet propaganda about the Five-Year Plan, just when he and other commanders had begun to lose hope in the Bolshevik Revolution. This revelation soon inspired a massive Soviet espionage and propaganda effort worldwide, with particular emphasis on nations with democratic governments.

=== Later years ===
From 1964 to 1972, Barmine served as a senior adviser on Soviet affairs at the U.S. Information Agency. Barmine won three awards for outstanding public service while in the federal government.

== Family ==
After attending the Red Army's General Staff School, he was eventually assigned to the Soviet Foreign Office and the Commissariat of Trade. He married a widow with prominent connections in the Communist Party, Olga Federovna, and the two traveled to Soviet Turkestan to work in the party apparatus. There, they both became ill with severe cases of malaria. Returning to Moscow, the couple had twin boys, but his wife died in childbirth.

In 1948, Barmine married Edith Kermit Roosevelt, granddaughter of President Theodore Roosevelt. They had one daughter, Margot Roosevelt. In 1952, they divorced. Barmine then married Halyna Barmine.

Alexander Barmine died at age 88 on December 25, 1987, in Rockville, Maryland.

== Writings ==
Barmine began publishing anti-Stalinist, anti-communist writings within a month of his defection. He also published a short treatment of the Moscow trials, dated December 22, 1937, in an American foreign affairs magazine.

He published his first book on Stalin's Terror, Memoirs of a Soviet Diplomat, in 1938.

After the assassinations and questionable accidental deaths of several exiled Soviet citizens in Western Europe, including Trotsky's own son, Lev Sedov, he and an unidentified person left Europe for the United States in 1940. Barmine's ageing mother and his two sons remained behind in the Soviet Union; unable to get them out of the country, he never saw them again.

He published a second book, One Who Survived, in 1945, in which he wrote:

When I work on my book, I feel as though I were walking in a graveyard. All my friends and life associates have been shot. It seems to be some kind of mistake that I am alive.

By making his revelations public, Barmine felt the book might help frustrate Stalin's immediate desire to silence him. Upon its release, the Soviet government made no comment on Barmine's revelations, though they had denounced earlier works by other Soviet émigré authors.

Articles

- "Russian View of the Moscow Trials" in International Conciliation journal (February 1938)

Books

- Memoirs of a Soviet Diplomat: Twenty Years in the Service of the USSR, translated by Gerard Hopkins (1938)
- One Who Survived: The Life Story of a Russian Under the Soviets, introduced by Max Eastman (1945)

== See also ==
- Moscow Trials
- Margot Roosevelt
- Whittaker Chambers
