= Hornblower & Weeks =

American investment bank

- Type: Acquired
- Industry: Brokerage, Investment bank
- Founded: 1888
- Fate: Merged with Loeb, Rhoades & Co. to form Loeb, Rhoades, Hornblower & Co.
- Headquarters: Boston, Massachusetts; New York, New York

Hornblower & Weeks was an investment banking and brokerage firm founded by Henry Hornblower and John W. Weeks in 1888. At its peak in the late 1970s, Hornblower ranked eighth among member firms of the New York Stock Exchange in number of retail offices, with 93 retail sales offices located in the United States and Europe.

Hornblower was active in financing automobile companies in the first half of the 20th century, including Dodge Motors, General Motors, and Hudson Motor Car Company.

The firm, which by the 1970s, was known as Hornblower & Weeks, Hemphill, Noyes and later, Hornblower, Weeks, Noyes & Trask, was acquired by Loeb, Rhoades & Co. to form Loeb, Rhoades, Hornblower & Co.

== History ==
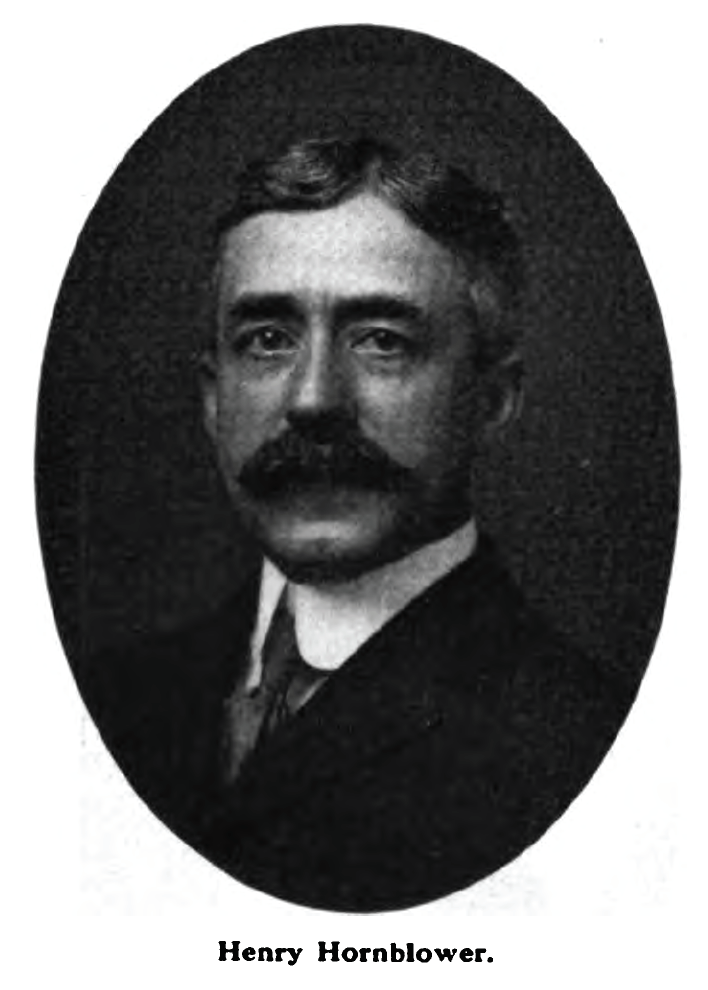
Henry Hornblower c.1908

=== Founding and early history ===
Hornblower & Weeks was organized on August 7, 1888. Henry Hornblower and John W. Weeks undertook the continuation of the business of Hornblower & Page, which had been founded and managed by Hornblower's father, Edward Thomas Hornblower.

Henry Hornblower joined his father's firm in 1879 at age 16, serving as a clerk. Hornblower, who was born June 6, 1863, in Lawrence, Massachusetts, came from a distinguished family in Boston. "The name of 'Hornblower' is one of the features of Boston and the old Bay State. It is a name that has flourished through generations...The line of Hornblowers in Boston and New England has been an honorable one as far back as family prestige can be traced."

Following the death of Mr. Augustus A. Page in the spring of 1888, Edward Hornblower, blind by this time, announced his retirement and his intention to dissolve the firm. The younger Hornblower joined with John Weeks to begin the new firm where the old one had left off. The firm's original office was located at 51 State Street with one clerk, James J. Phelan, who would ultimately serve as a partner of the firm until his death in 1934. In 1889, they bought a seat on the New York Stock Exchange for $19,000 and moved to the Merchant’s Bank Building on Devonshire Street. Surviving the Panic of 1893, which resulted in numerous failures of industrial corporations and financial houses, the young firm moved into larger quarters on the second floor of the Exchange Building at 53 State Street.

=== 1900-1950 ===
By 1900, the firm had a net worth of $400,000, by 1902, $800,000, and in 1903 and 1904, founding partner John W. Weeks, consolidated the First National Bank of Boston with the National Bank of Redemption, creating the largest bank in New England. In 1907, offices were opened in Providence and Chicago, and a Bond department was established. That same year, the firm became one of the first on Wall Street to set up a Statistical and Research Department.

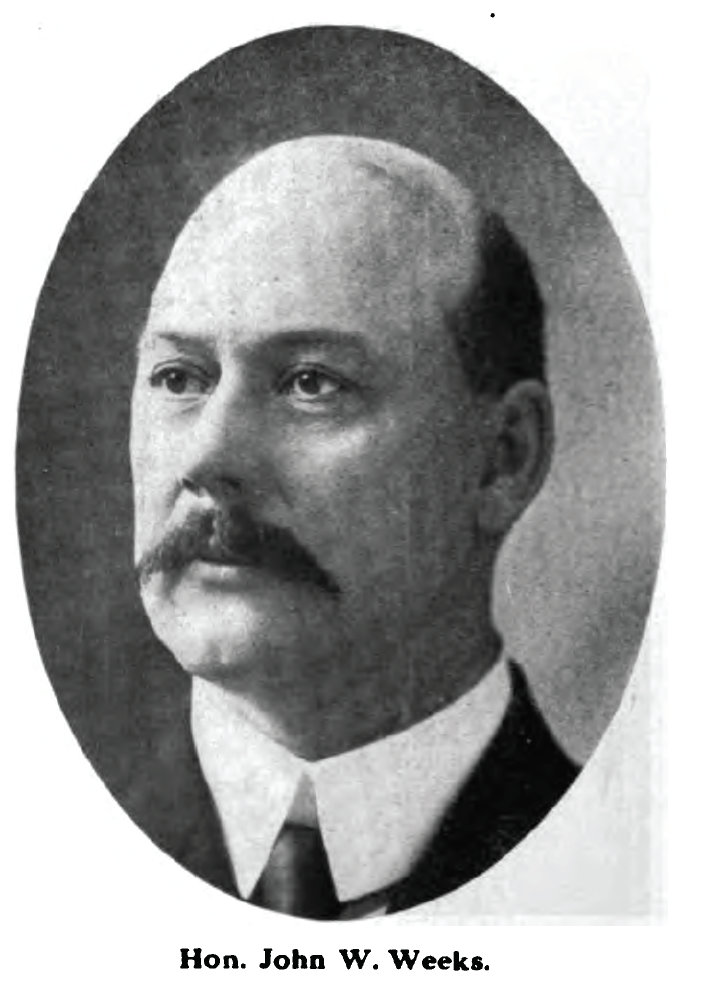
John W. Weeks c.1908

In 1913, Ralph Hornblower, son of the founder, Henry Hornblower, was admitted to the partnership, and John W. Weeks retired upon his election to the U.S. Senate. Weeks was involved in the creation of the Federal Reserve System in 1914 and would go on to be U.S. Secretary of War in the 1920s.

After the crash of 1929, which the firm survived with small capital losses except in the syndicate department, the firm went through a period of retrenchment. By 1930, firm capital had grown to over $16 million, but would be substantially reduced during the ensuing years of the depression. During the 1930s Hornblower made a number of acquisitions including a merger with G.M.-P. Murphy & Co., best known for its financing of major aviation companies, including Pan American Airways, United Air Lines, Boeing, and Lockheed.

In 1950, Henry Hornblower, II and Ralph Hornblower Jr., were admitted as partners to the firm.

=== Expansion and consolidation from 1950-1977 ===
In 1953, Hornblower & Weeks merged with the firm Paul H. Davis & Co. of Chicago, which had functioned as a correspondent of the New York Hornblower office. Later that year the acquisition of the cotton brokerage business of Scatterty & Jones led to new Hornblower offices in the Southern U.S. The mergers brought the firm’s total to 19 offices nationwide. Reed & Company of Worcester, Massachusetts was acquired in 1955.

In the 1960s, the firm opened new offices around the country with thirty offices operating from coast to coast, and memberships were held in all the major American exchanges by 1963.

The firm merged with Hemphill, Noyes & Co. in 1963, changing its name to Hornblower & Weeks, Hemphill, Noyes. Hemphill, Noyes & Co. had been founded in 1919 by Jansen Noyes and Clifford Hemphill, among others. Jansen Noyes Jr. was named chairman of Hornblower, Weeks, Hemphill, Noyes & Co. in 1968. Hornblower next acquired Spencer Trask & Co., changing the name once again to Hornblower, Weeks, Noyes & Trask. At this point in time, Hornblower ranked eighth among member firms of the New York Stock Exchange in number of retail offices, with 93 retail sales offices located in the United States and Europe.

=== Sale of Hornblower ===
In January 1977, Loeb, Rhoades & Co. agreed to a merger with Hornblower, Weeks, Noyes & Trask to form Loeb, Rhoades, Hornblower & Co. The merger turned out to be disastrous for both firms. The two firms incurred significant costs attempting to merge their back office operations, both of which had issues prior to the merger. By the end of 1978, less than a year after the merger, the combined firm was losing millions of dollars.

Through the 1960s and 1970s, Sanford I. Weill was acquiring brokerage firms and by 1979 was running Shearson Hayden Stone, the culmination of nearly a dozen acquisitions. By early 1979, Hornblower, now known part of the larger Loeb, Rhoades, Hornblower & Co. was suffering and looking for a potential acquiror. During Mothers Day Weekend 1979, Loeb and Shearson agreed to a merger to form Shearson Loeb Rhoades. Weill was named the CEO of the combined firm and John Loeb became the firm's chairman. At the time, Shearson Loeb Rhoades was among the largest investment banking houses with $250 million of equity capital.

=== Successors ===
Following the merger with Shearson, the Hornblower name was retired permanently. Just two years later, in 1981, Weill sold the combined company to American Express to form Shearson/American Express.

Shortly after the merger with Shearson, Ralph Hornblower Jr., and Ralph (Ray) Hornblower III formed a new company, named Hornblower & Company with offices in Connecticut and Massachusetts.

== Merger history ==
The following is an illustration of the company's mergers and its role in later successor firms (this is not a comprehensive list):

- Shearson Lehman Hutton (merged 1988)
  - Shearson Lehman Brothers (merged 1984)
    - Shearson/American Express (merged 1981)
      - American Express
        (est. 1850)
      - Shearson Loeb Rhoades (acquired 1981)
        - Shearson Hayden Stone (merged 1973)
          - Hayden Stone, Inc. (formerly CBWL-Hayden Stone, merged 1970)
            - Cogan, Berlind, Weill & Levitt
              (formerly Carter, Berlind, Potoma & Weill, est. 1960)
            - Hayden, Stone & Co.
          - Shearson, Hammill & Co.
            (est. 1902)
        - Loeb, Rhoades, Hornblower & Co. (merged 1978)
          - Loeb, Rhoades & Co. (merged 1937)
            - Carl M. Loeb & Co.
              (est. 1931)
            - Rhoades & Company
              (est. 1905)
          - Hornblower, Weeks, Noyes & Trask (merged 1953‑1977)
            - Hornblower & Weeks
              (est. 1888)
            - Hemphill, Noyes & Co.
              (est. 1919, acq. 1963)
            - Spencer Trask & Co.
              (est. 1866 as Trask & Brown)
            - Paul H. Davis & Co.
              (est. 1920, acq. 1953)
    - Lehman Brothers Kuhn Loeb (merged 1977)
      - Lehman Brothers
        (est. 1850)
      - Kuhn, Loeb & Co.
        (est. 1867)
      - Abraham & Co.
        (est. 1938, acq. 1975)
  - E. F. Hutton & Co.
    (est. 1904)
