= Fairfield (typeface) =

- Category: Serif
- Classification: Old-style
- Designer: Rudolf Ruzicka
- Foundry: Linotype
- Date created: 1940

Fairfield is an old-style serif typeface designed by Rudolf Ruzicka for body text use. Its design is rooted in the forms of Venetian Old Face types. Fairfield Medium was designed in 1940 and released in 1947.

Ruzicka said of the typeface that "the limitations accepted were those tending to the greatest economy of means, rather than those supposedly inherent in the machine. For this reason ligatures (which only add to the number of characters) were confined to the f combinations required by usage. The lowercase fs, both roman and italic, fit not only all the characters, but even themselves – the twenty six leaden soldiers could fight their battles untied yet in accord".

== Digital versions ==
Computer font versions are available as Adobe Fairfield LT Std and Bitstream Transitional 551. The Adobe designer Alex Kaczun has redone and expanded upon the original Linotype face with bold and heavy weights plus small capitals and old style figures. Fanwood is an open-source version from Barry Schwartz, including Fanwood Text designed specifically for digital screens.
