= Ralph Hornblower =

- Born: February 26, 1891; Arlington, Massachusetts, U.S.
- Died: September 18, 1960 (aged 69); Plymouth, Massachusetts, U.S.
- Education: Harvard College
- Occupation: Business executive
- Years active: 1911–1948
- Known for: Former Hornblower & Weeks partner
- Spouse: Eleanor Greenwood (m. 1940)
- Children: 3
- Relatives: Henry Hornblower (father); Ruth Hornblower Churchill (sister); Ralph Hornblower III (grandson)

Ralph Hornblower (February 26, 1891 – September 18, 1960) was an American business executive who was the senior partner in Hornblower & Weeks, an investment banking firm established by his father, Henry Hornblower, and John W. Weeks.

== Early life ==
Hornblower was born on February 26, 1891 in Arlington, Massachusetts. He played for the Volkmann School's track and hockey teams and was a member of the Harvard Crimson freshman hockey and golf teams. He spent three seasons as the starting right wing for Harvard's varsity hockey team and was elected team captain his senior season. He suffered a broken jaw in the January 31, 1911 game against Cornell and missed the remainder of the season.

He graduated from Harvard College in 1911 and that December was a founding member of the Boston Athletic Association ice hockey team. Hornblower was a top amateur golfer and won the 1915 Boston Athletic Association golf championship.

In 1916, Hornblower married Eleanor Greenwood, daughter of former President of the Massachusetts Senate Levi H. Greenwood. They had two sons, Ralph Hornblower Jr. and Henry Hornblower II, and a daughter Martha (Hornblower) Gibson McCarthy. The family resided in Boston and Hobe Sound, Florida.

== Career ==
Hornblower joined Hornblower & Weeks in 1911. He was admitted to partnership after founder John W. Weeks retired from the firm on January 1, 1913. He left the firm during World War I to serve as a Lieutenant in the United States Navy. In 1942, the firm merged with the G.M.-P. Murphy & Co. In 1948, he suffered a heart attack and ended his active participation in the firm. During his career, Hornblower was a director of numerous companies, including the Bangor and Aroostook Railroad and the Saco-Lowell Shops.

In 1925, Hornblower helped organize the Eastern Amateur Hockey League and served as a vice president and member of the league's board of governors during its only season in existence.

== Death ==
Hornblower died on September 18, 1960 at Jordan Hospital in Plymouth, Massachusetts.
