= Plimoth Patuxet =

Museum in Plymouth, Massachusetts, U.S.

Coordinates: 41°56′20.64″N 70°37′33.69″W

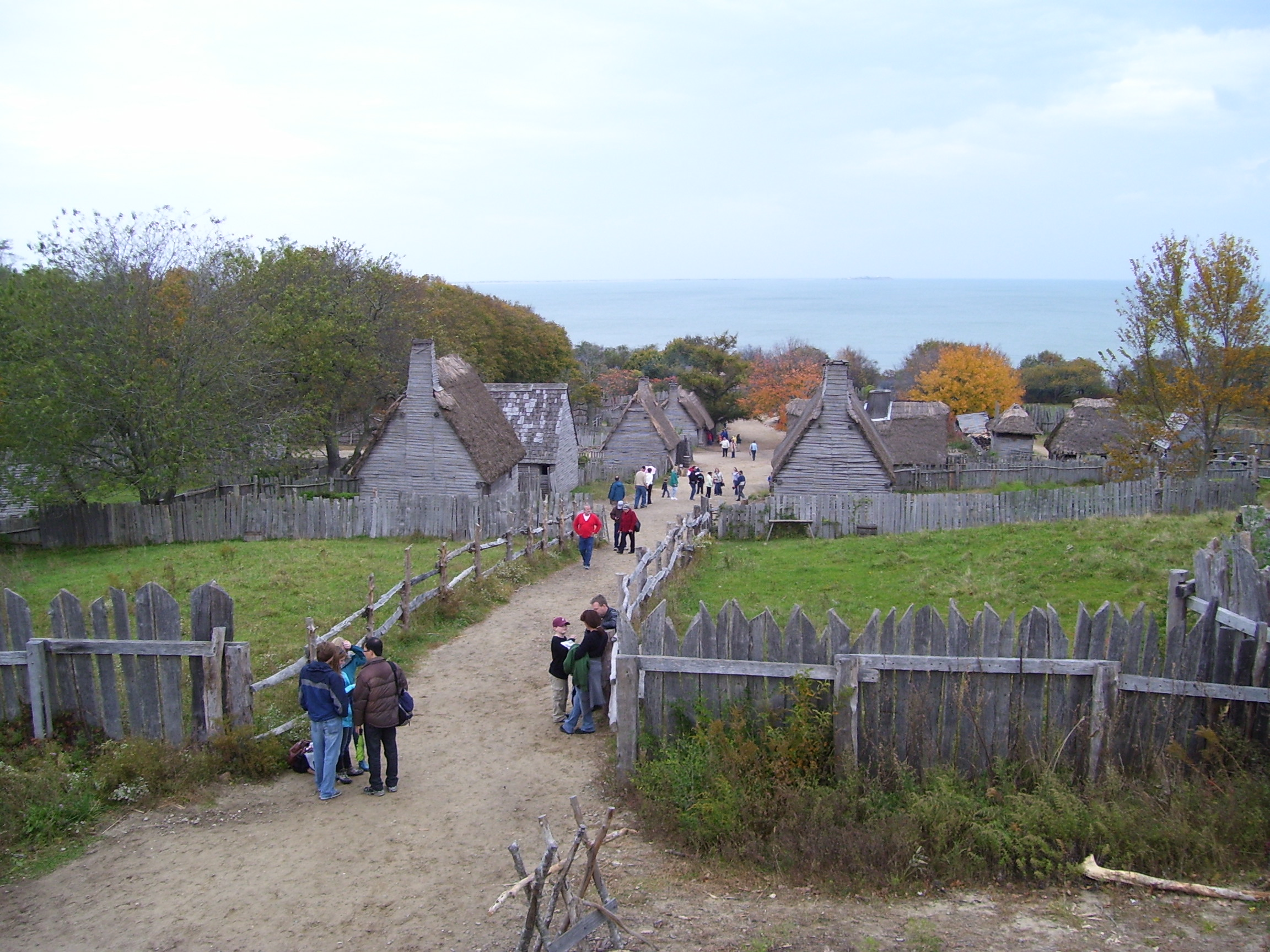
- A view of the Main Street of the Plimoth village.
- Established: 1947
- Location: Plymouth, Massachusetts
- Website: https://plimoth.org/

Plimoth Patuxet is a complex of living history museums in Plymouth, Massachusetts founded in 1947, formerly Plimoth Plantation. It replicates the original settlement of the Plymouth Colony established in the 17th century by the English colonists who became known as the Pilgrims. They were among the first people who emigrated to America to seek religious separation from the Church of England. It is a not-for-profit museum supported by administrations, contributions, grants, and volunteers. The recreations are based upon a wide variety of first-hand and second-hand records, accounts, articles, and period paintings and artifacts, and the museum conducts ongoing research and scholarship, including historical archaeological excavation and curation locally and abroad.

In the English Village section of the museum, trained first-person ("historical") interpreters speak, act, and dress appropriately for the period, interacting with visitors by answering questions, discussing their lives and viewpoints, and participating in tasks such as cooking, planting, and animal husbandry. Third-person ("modern") interpreters answer guests' questions that the first-person interpreters cannot. The English Village represents the year 1627 through most of the museum season (which lasts from early April to late November), depicting day-to-day life and seasonal activities. In November, the English Village typically represents the year 1621, which is the year of the first Thanksgiving to take place in Plymouth Colony.

== History ==
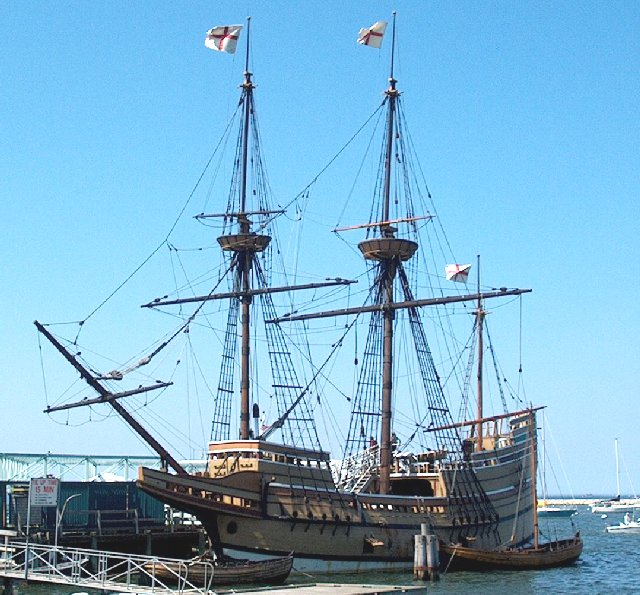
Mayflower II

Henry Hornblower II, son of Ralph Hornblower, started the museum in 1947 with help and support from friends, family, and business associates as two English cottages and a fort on Plymouth's waterfront. Since then, the museum has grown to include the Mayflower II, a 1957 replica of the Mayflower, the English Village (1959), the Wampanoag Homesite (1973), the Hornblower Visitor Center (1987), the Craft Center (1992), the Maxwell and Nye Barns (1994), and the Plimoth Grist Mill (2013). Alongside the settlement is a recreation of a Wampanoag home site, where Indians from a variety of tribes explain and demonstrate how the Wampanoags' ancestors lived.

The museum grounds at Plimoth Patuxet also include Nye Barn where historical breeds of livestock are kept, a crafts center where many objects are created for use in the village exhibits, a cinema where educational videos are shown, a Colonial Education site for youth and adult groups, and a visitors' center with indoor exhibits and educational programs. The two houses on the Colonial Education site were built for the PBS show Colonial House, which was filmed in Maine. Following the filming, the museum disassembled the houses and reconstructed them at on their current site. The roof of the Cooke House was destroyed by a fire from a fireplace on November 19, 2011, and the building had to be demolished.

Mayflower II is docked near Plymouth Rock and is also under the care of the museum. Museum employees in modern dress interpret history to guests from a third-person perspective.

=== Name change ===
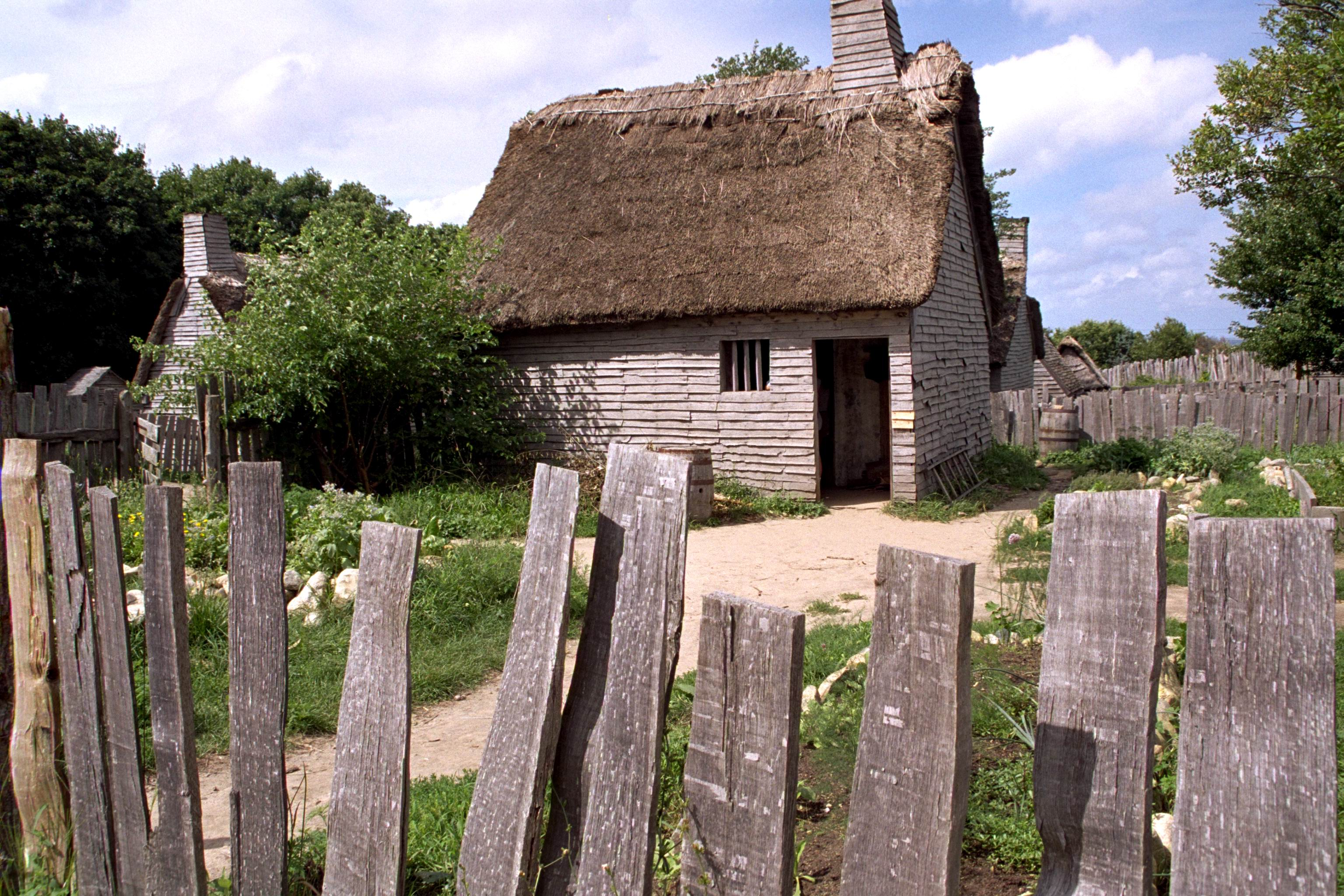
The recreated 17th-century village at Plimoth Patuxet

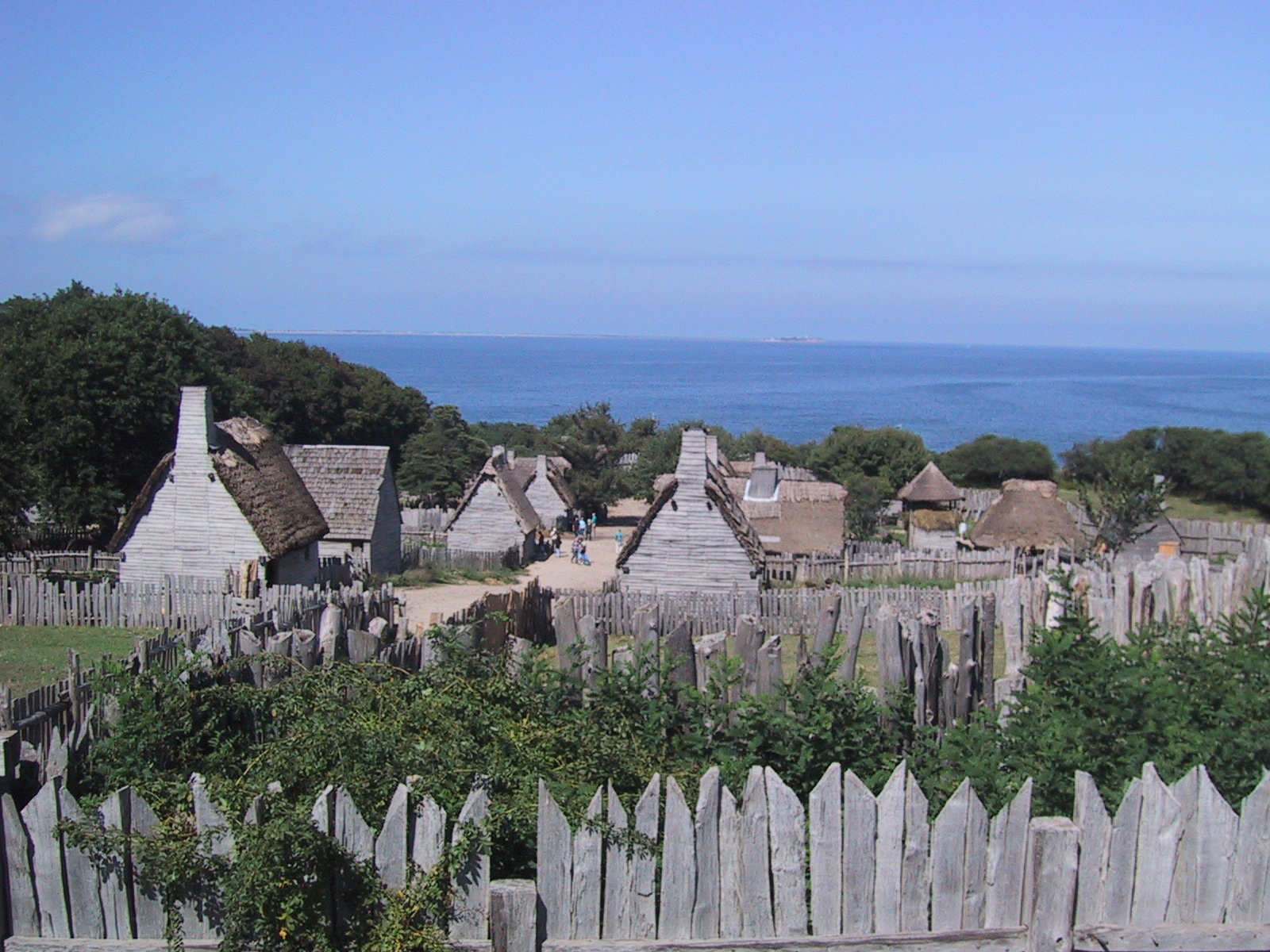
Another view of the recreated 17th-century village

In July 2020, officials announced that the museum would be renamed, noting that their plan, "for some time, has been to announce a new name for the Museum later this year as we commemorate the 400th anniversary (1620–2020) of the Pilgrims' arrival on the shores of historic Patuxet." It coincided with a wave of name changes caused by the George Floyd protests that year meant to be more inclusive. While the word "plantation" historically referred to a type of colony, and this was the sense intended for Plimoth Plantation, it soon came to refer to a type of farming estate established to grow cash crops, and in the modern era has become popularly associated with those plantations that employed slave labor, especially in the South. Officials stated that discussions had been ongoing for more than a year to assess whether the existing name reflected "the full, multivalent history that is at the core of the museum's mission." While a new name was not yet revealed, the museum began using a new logo that read "Plimoth Patuxet" instead of "Plimoth Plantation".

== Images ==
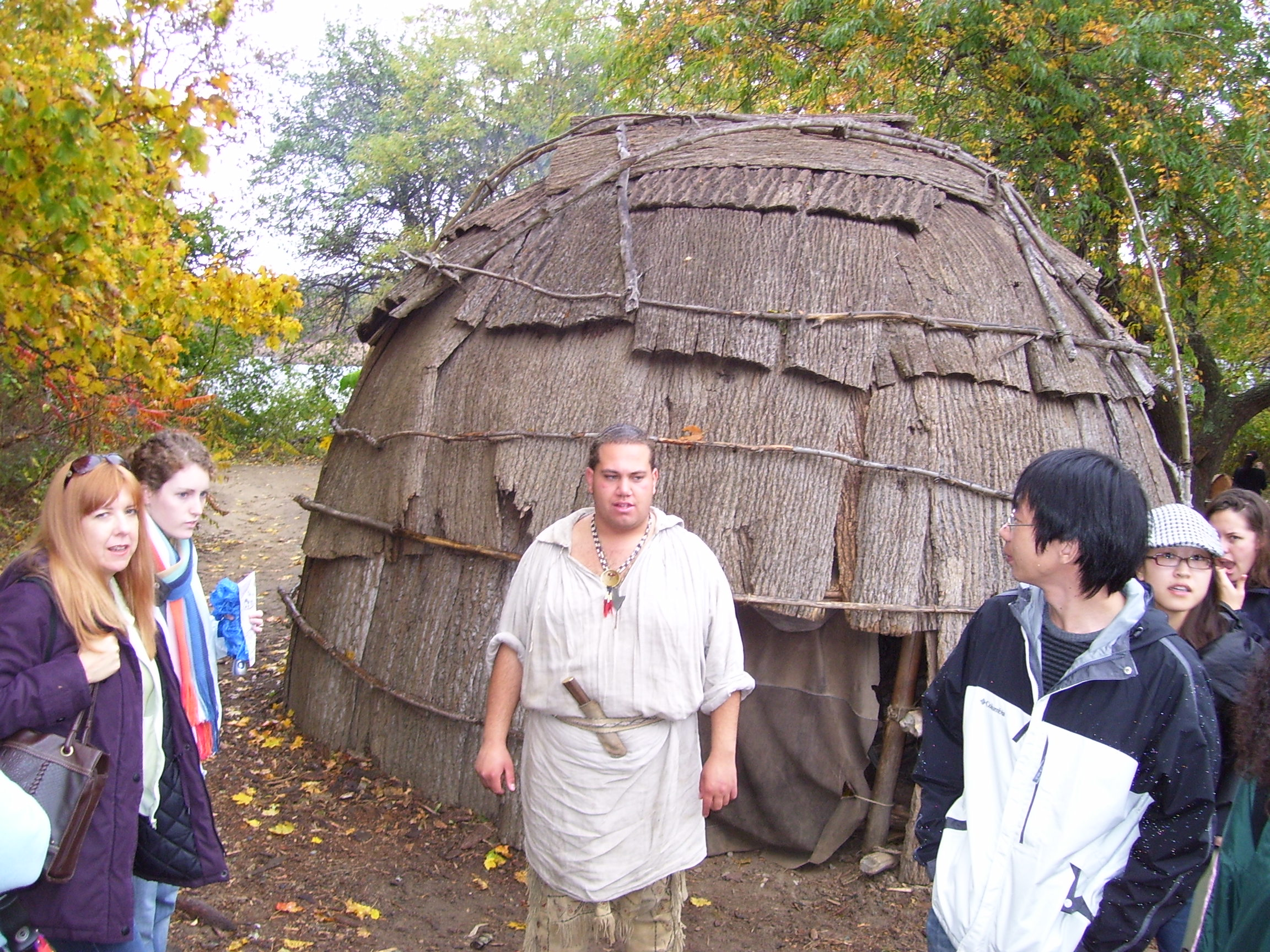
Wigwam and Wampanoag guide

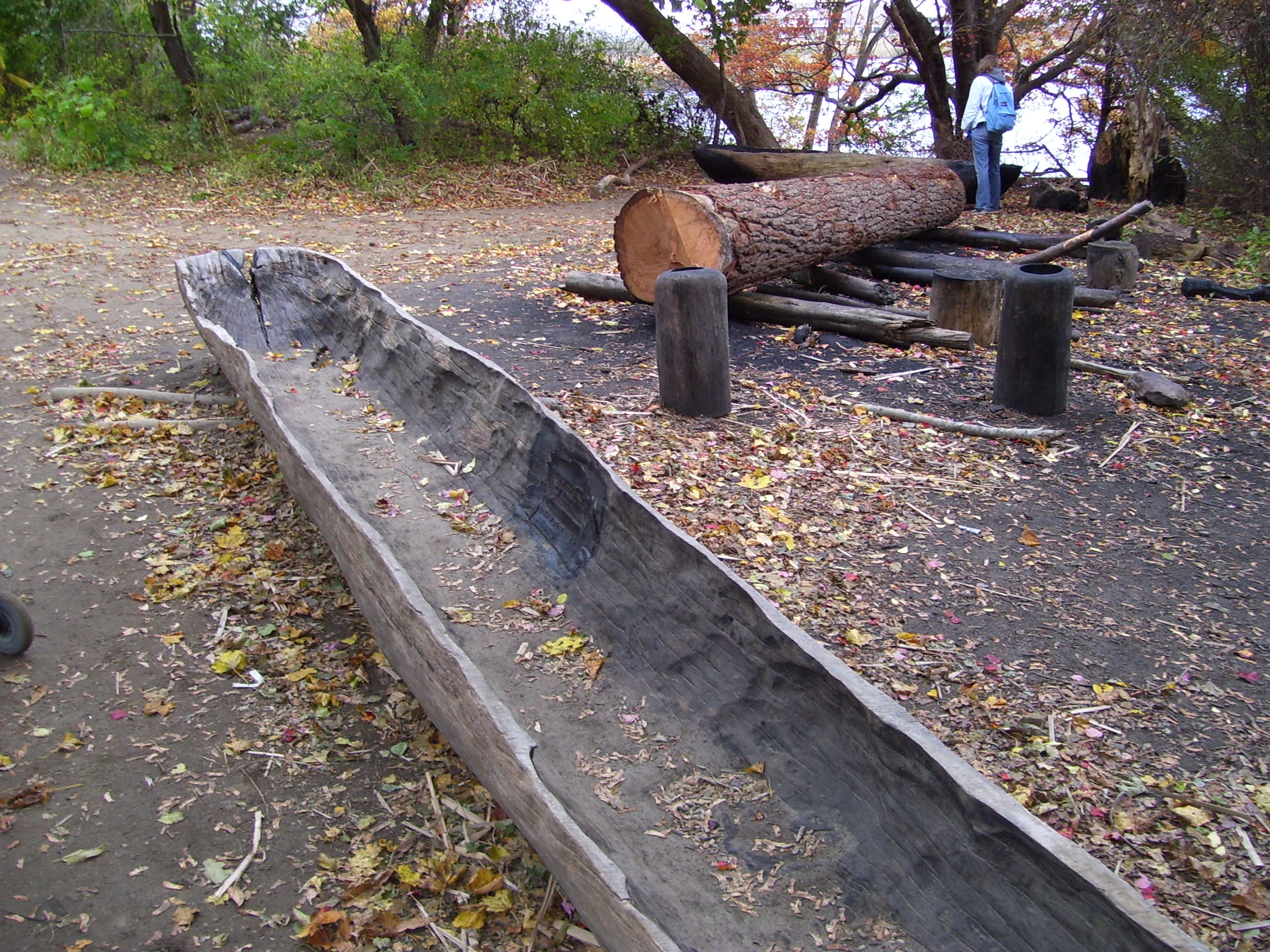
American Indian canoes (mishoons) under construction

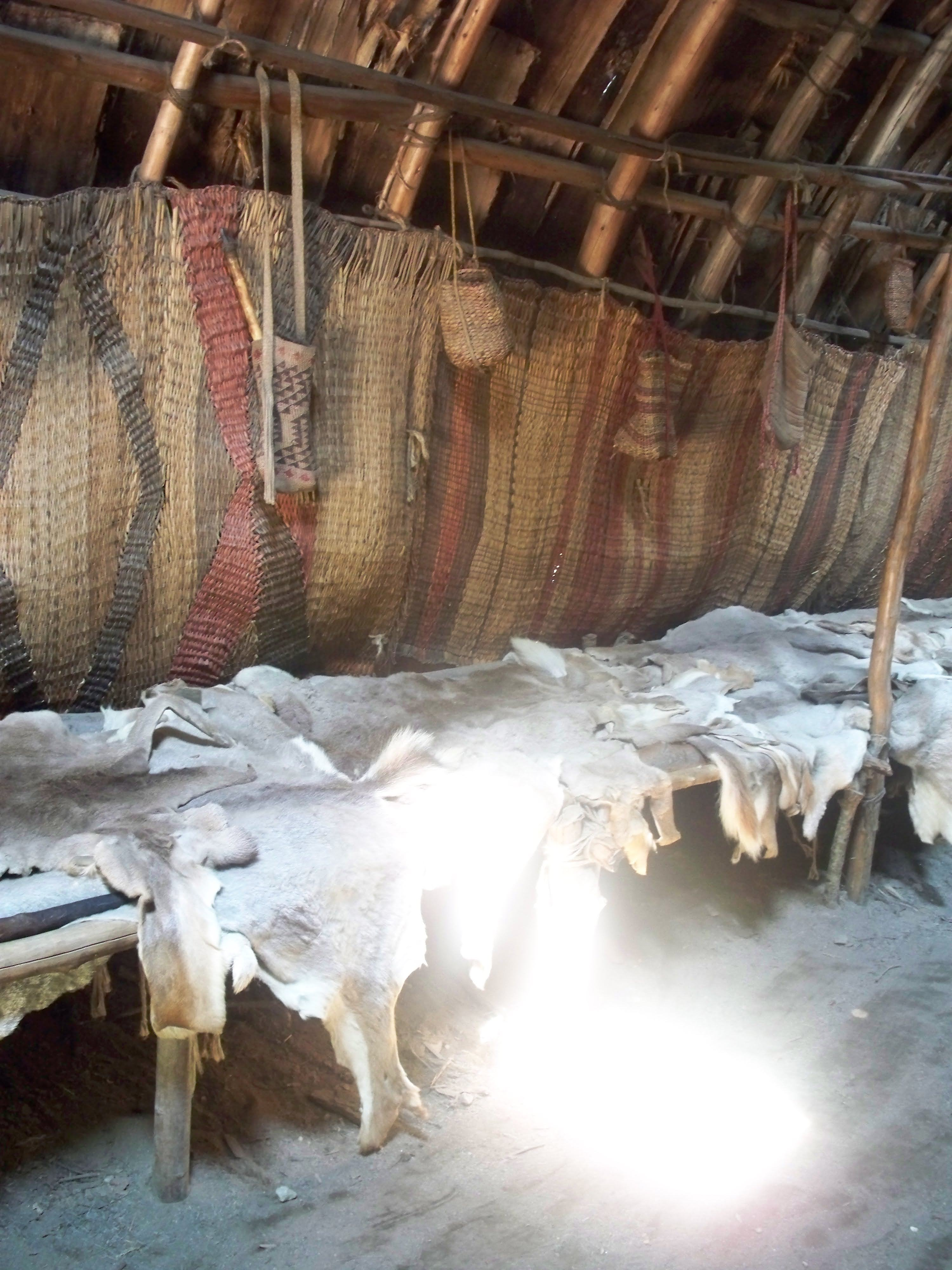
Inside wetu (house) or wigwam

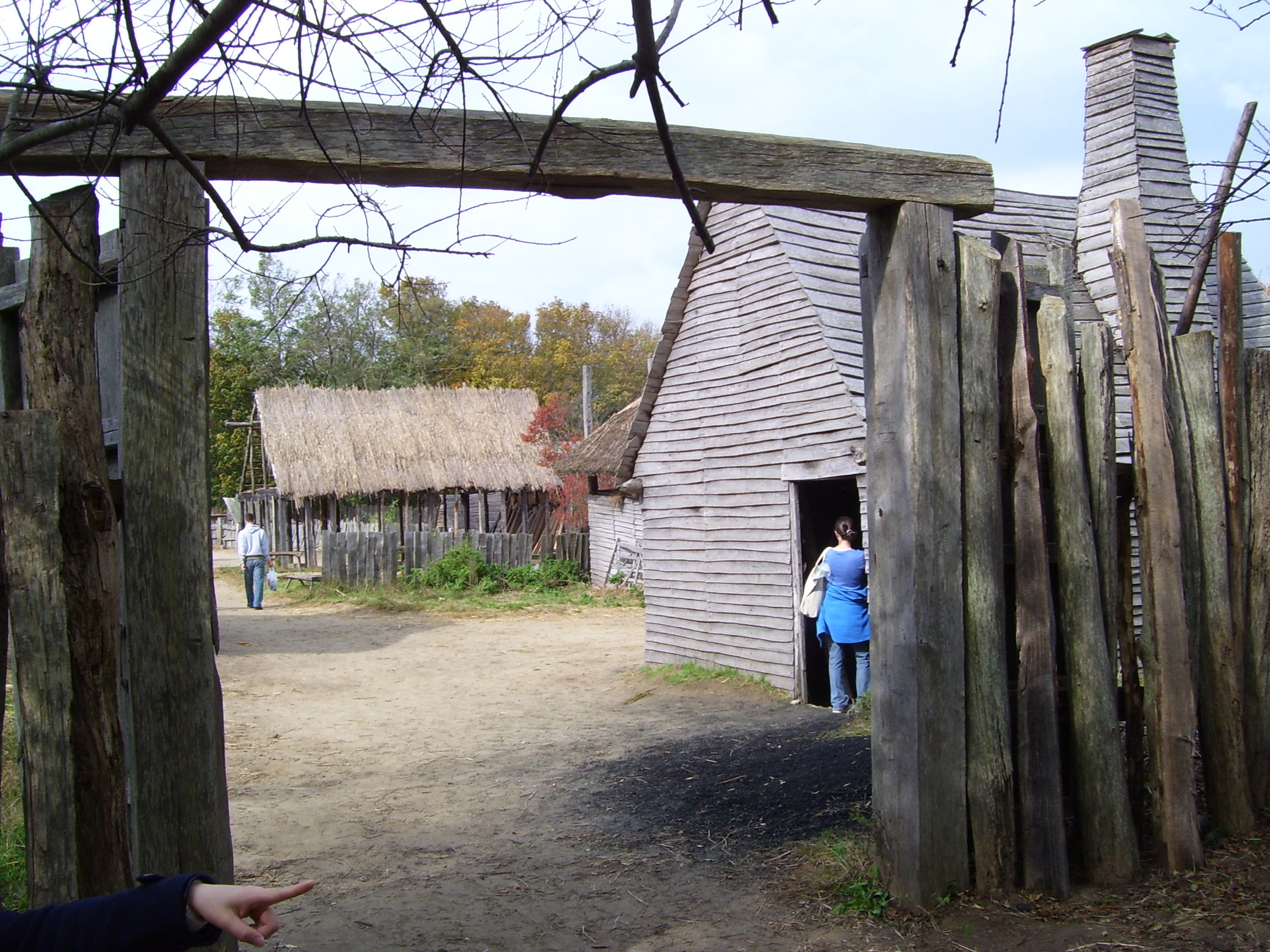
Entrance, with blacksmith shop on the right

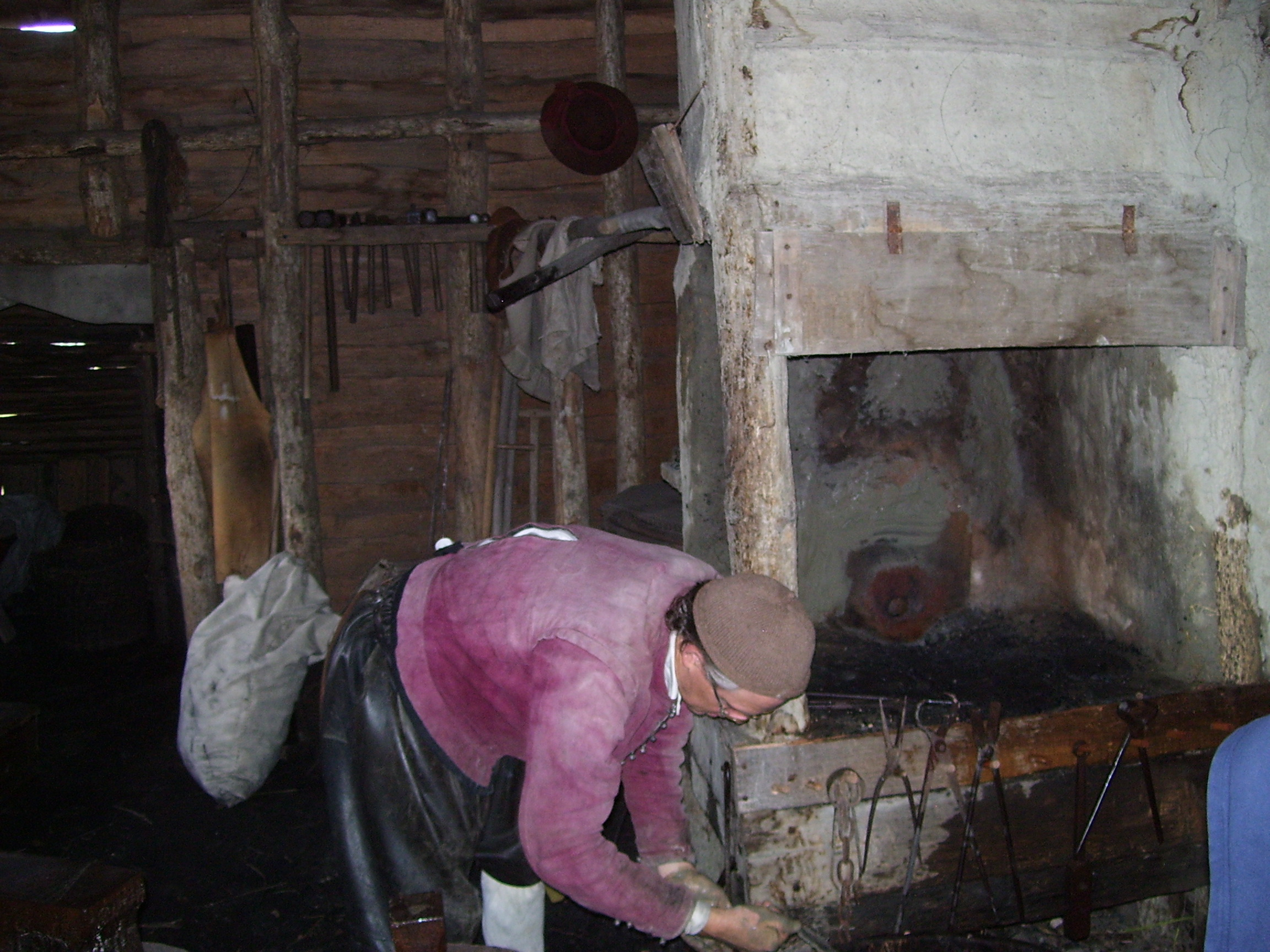
Blacksmith

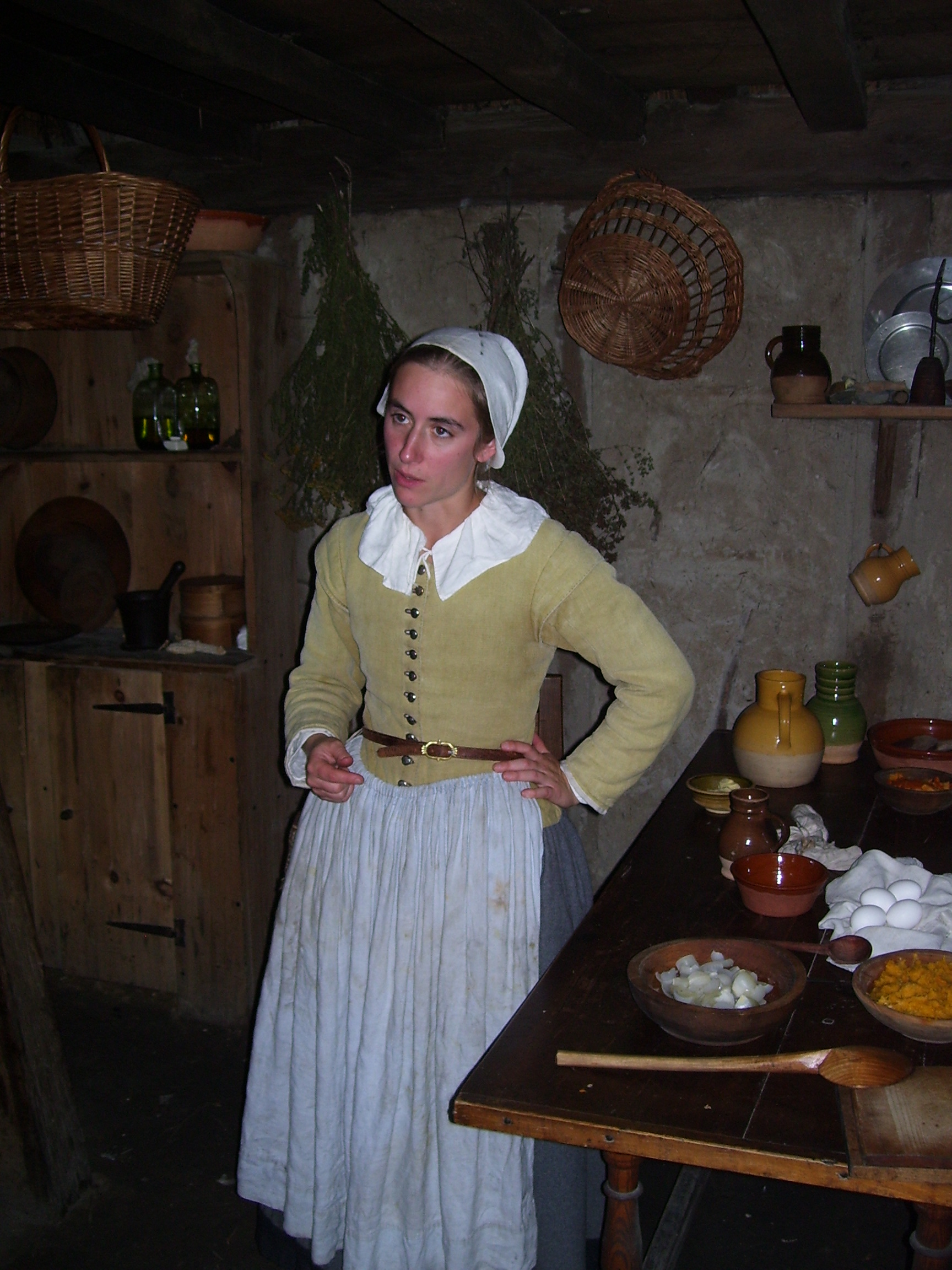
Mary Soule, wife of George Soule

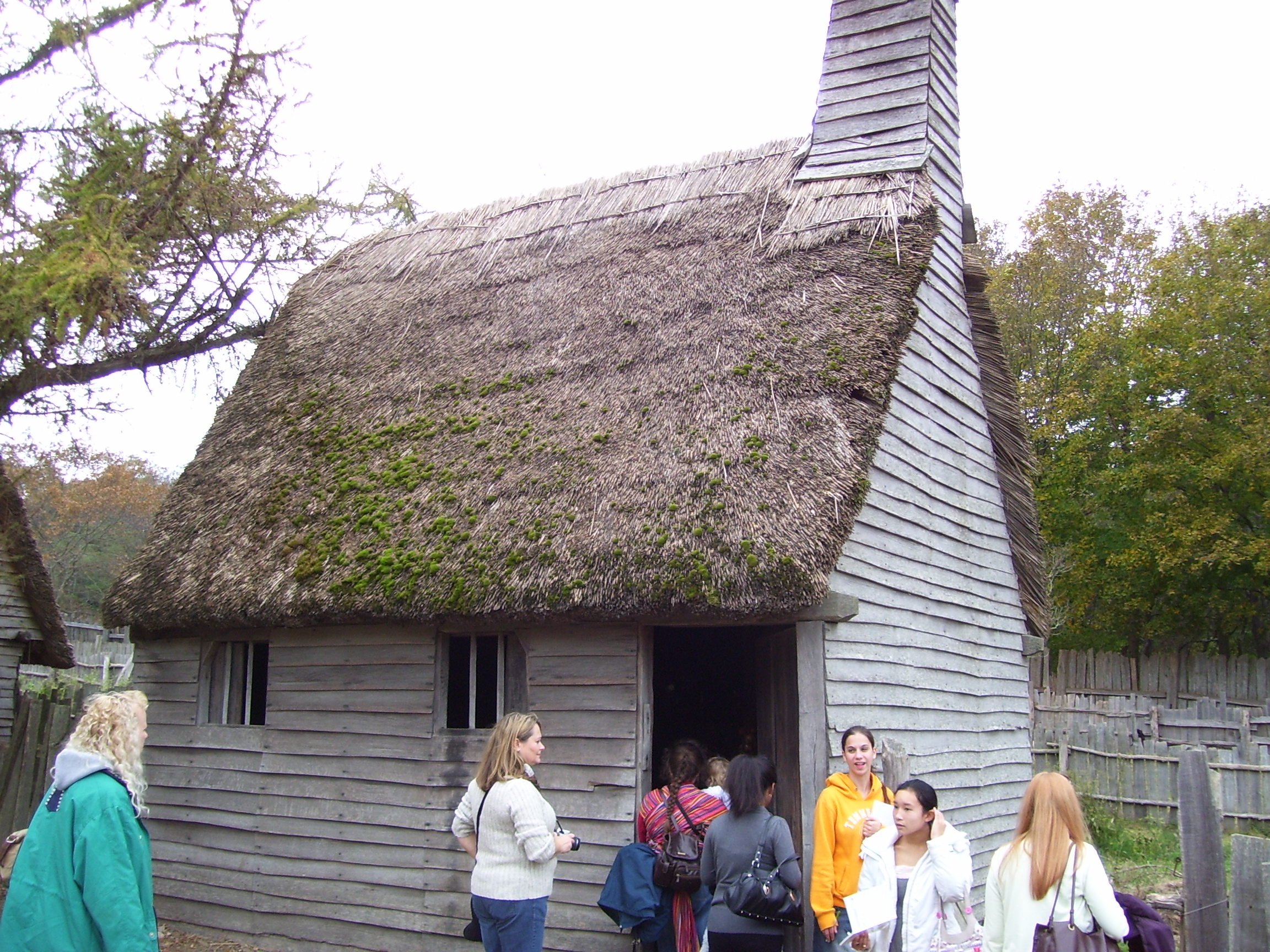
House

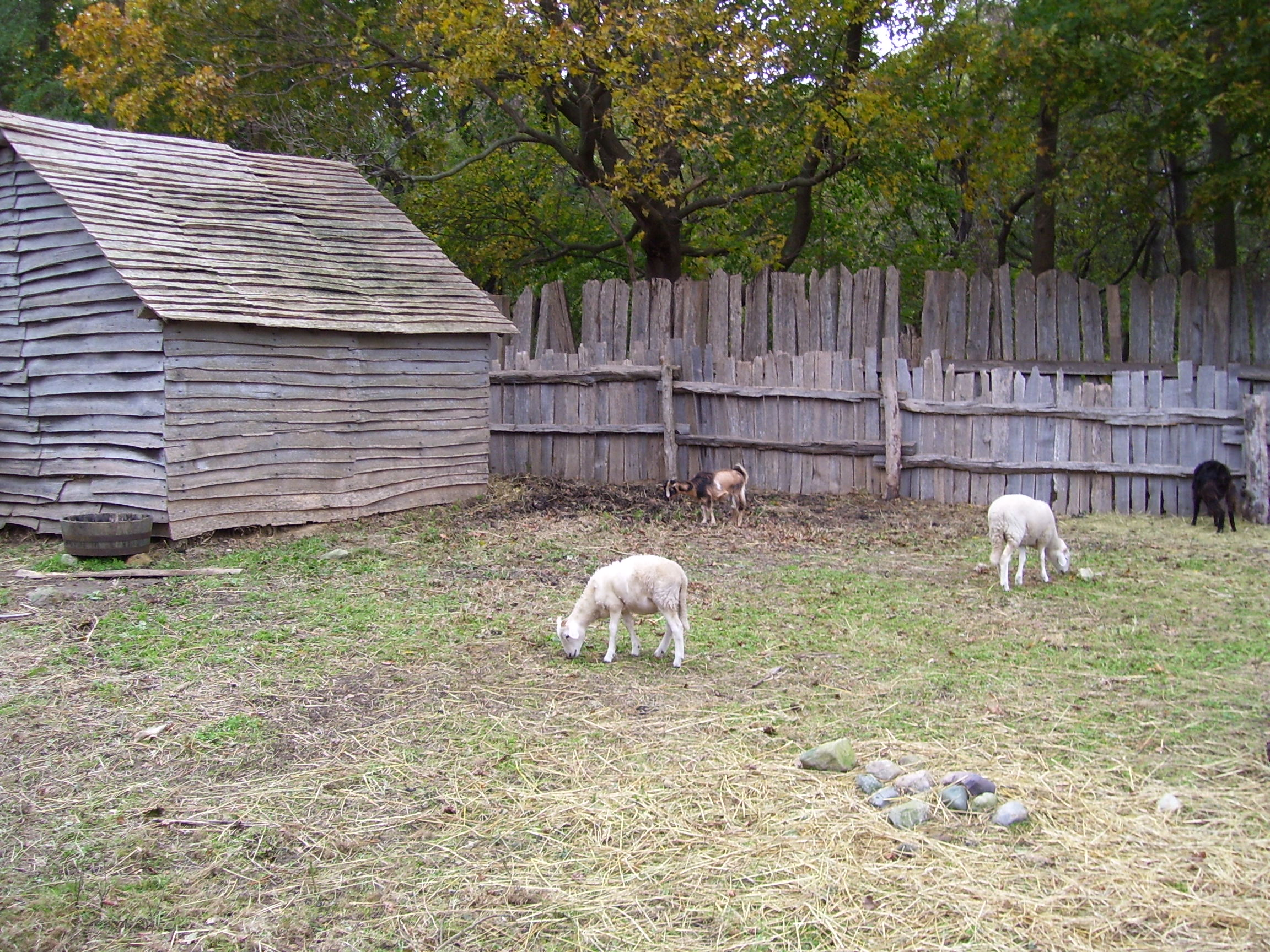
Livestock

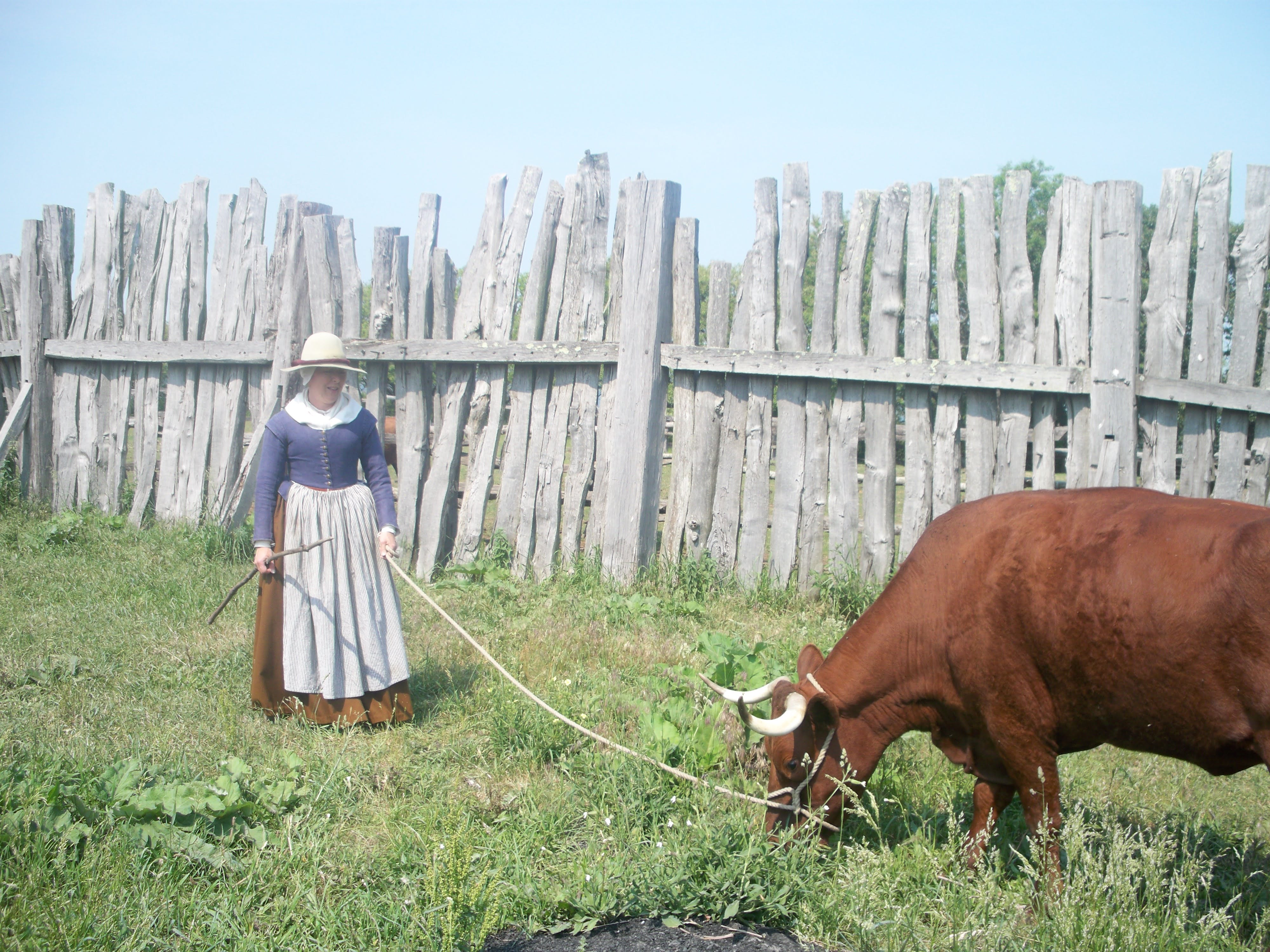
A goodwife with longhorn

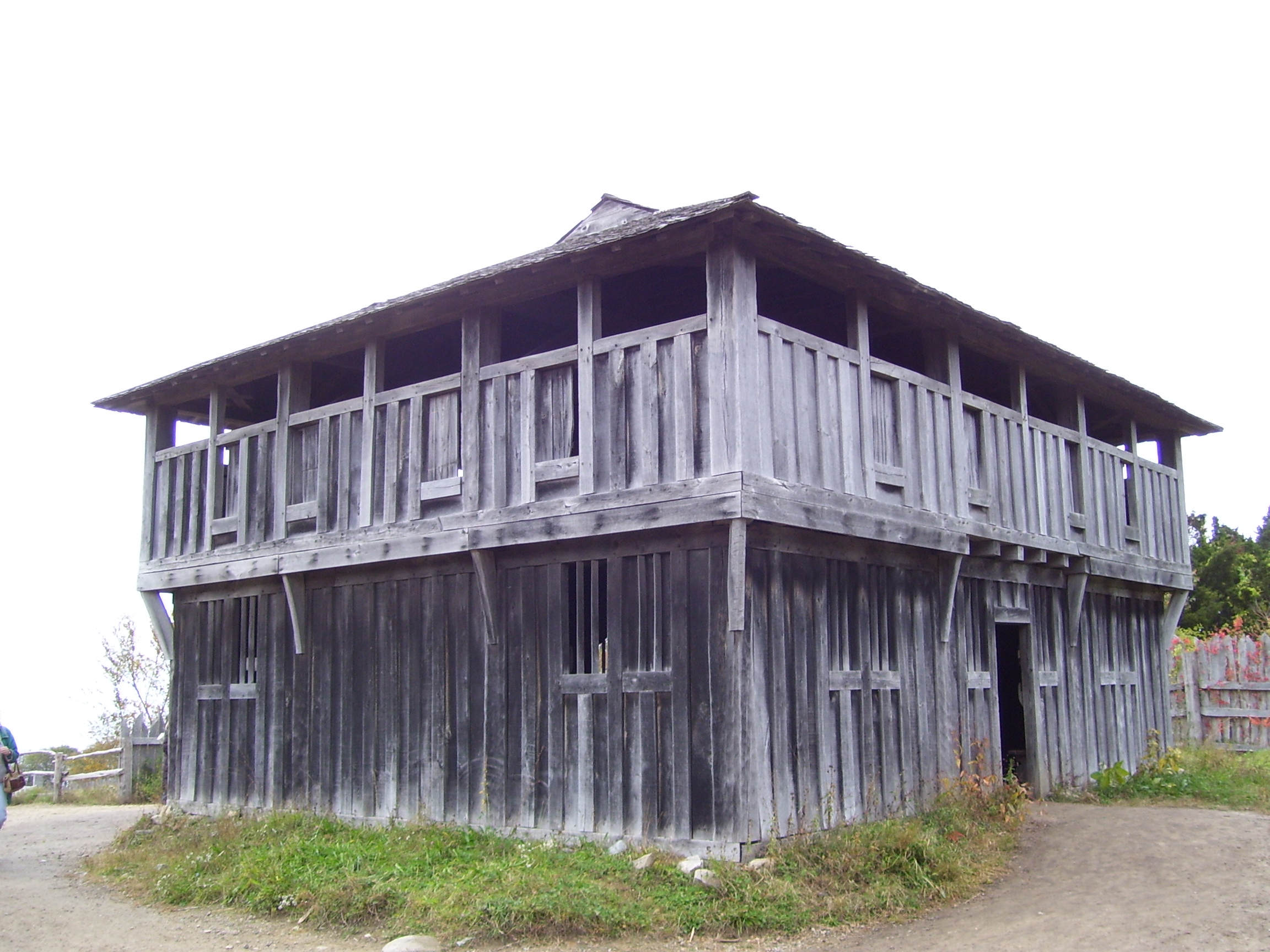
Recreated fort; the original fort also served as First Parish Church in Plymouth and a colony meeting house on Burial Hill.

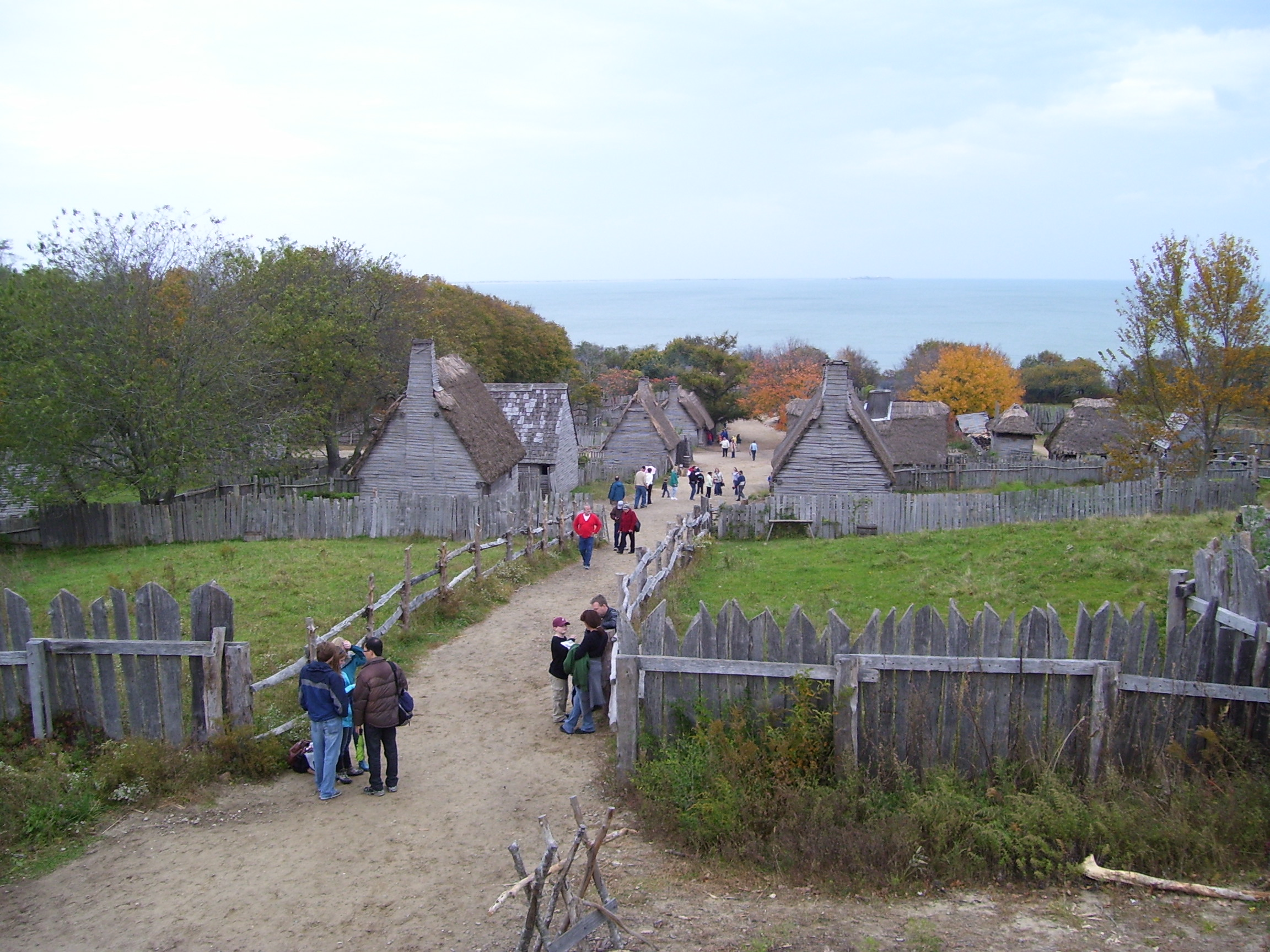
View from the fort, looking down a recreation of Leyden Street, the first street in Plymouth

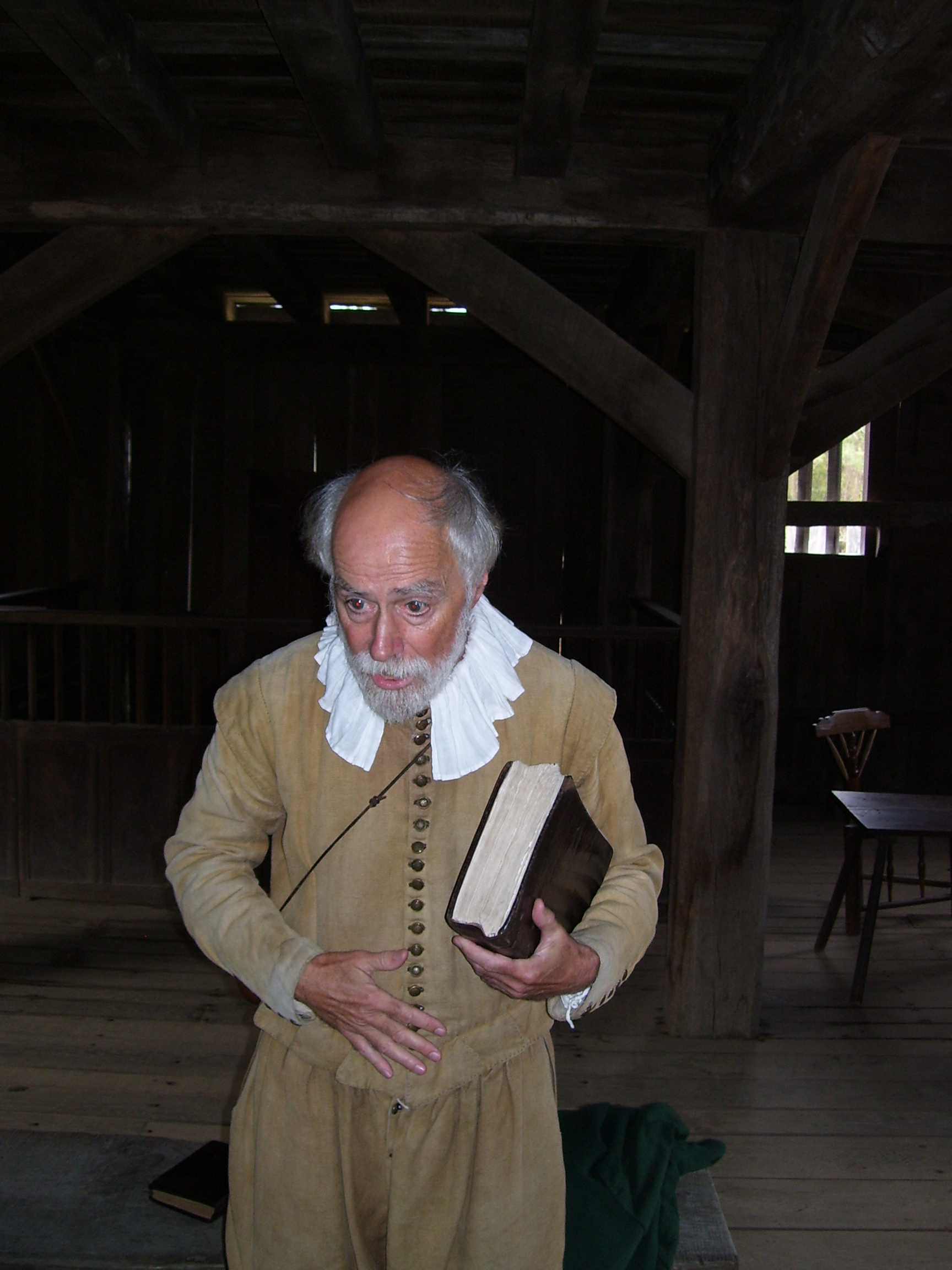
Dr. John Kemp, director of the Colonial Interpretation Department, portraying Samuel Fuller (Mayflower physician) at the church

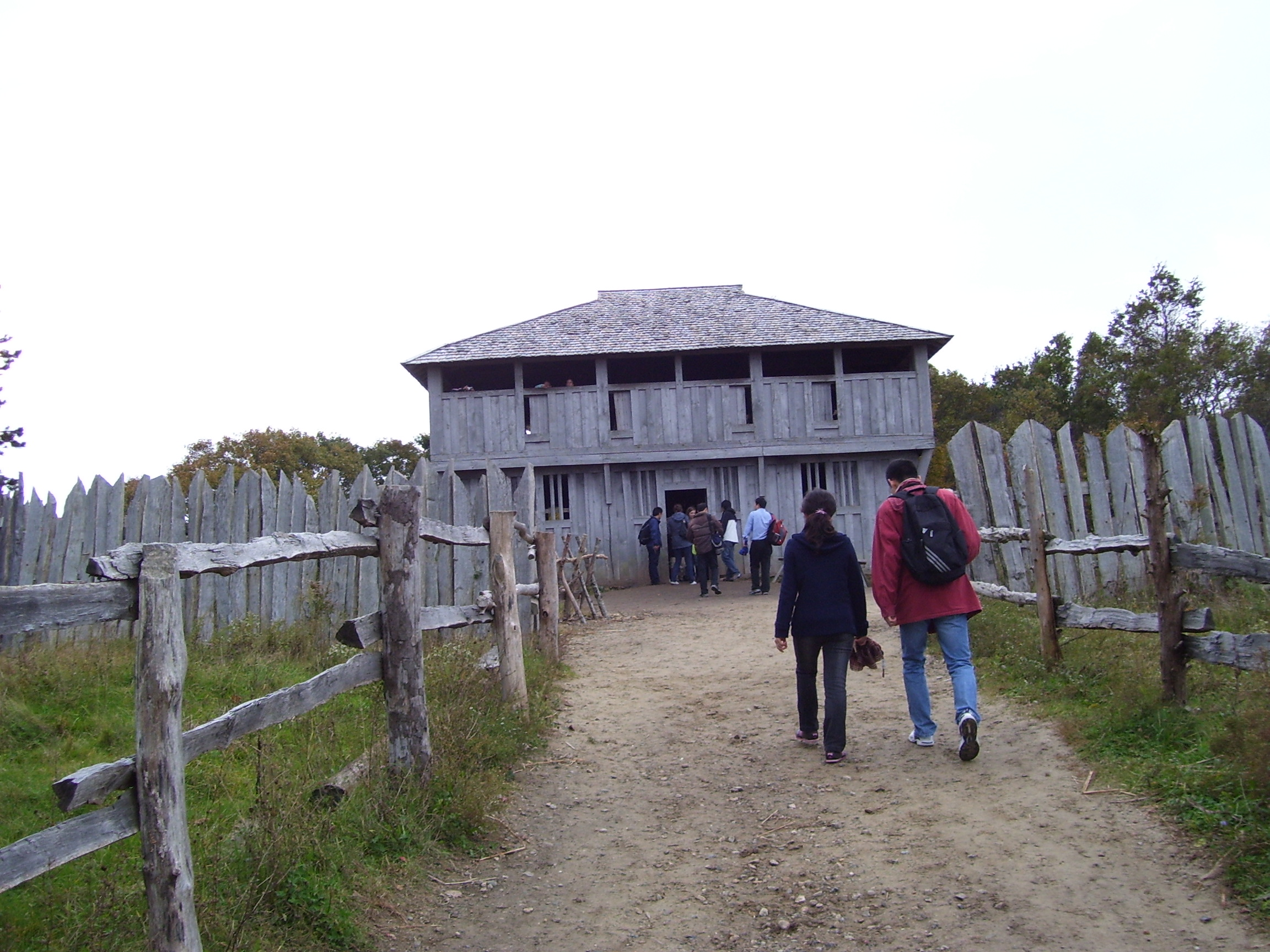
Fort (which actually stood on Burial Hill) as it might have appeared when coming up Leyden Street

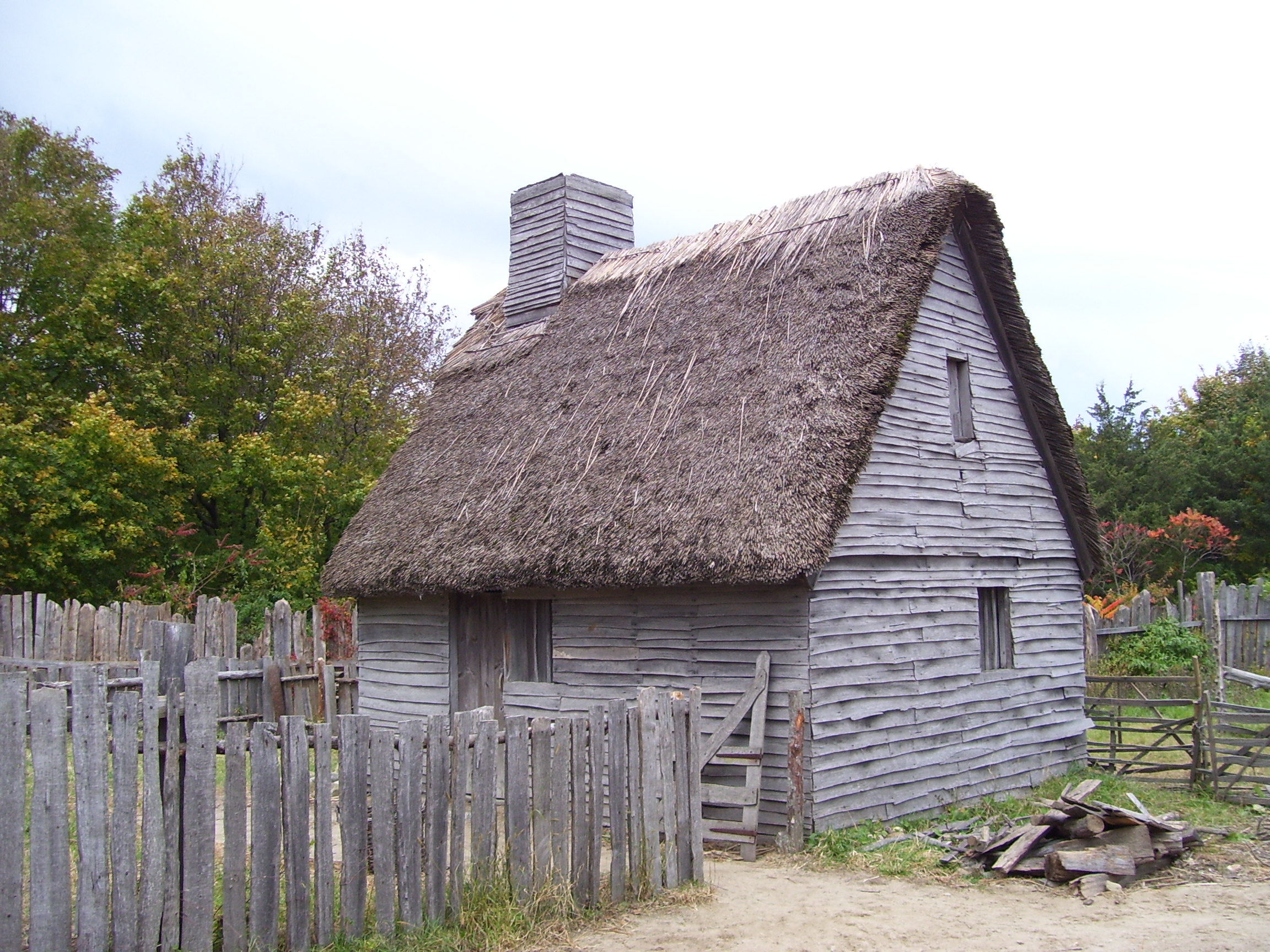
Pilgrim George Soule house

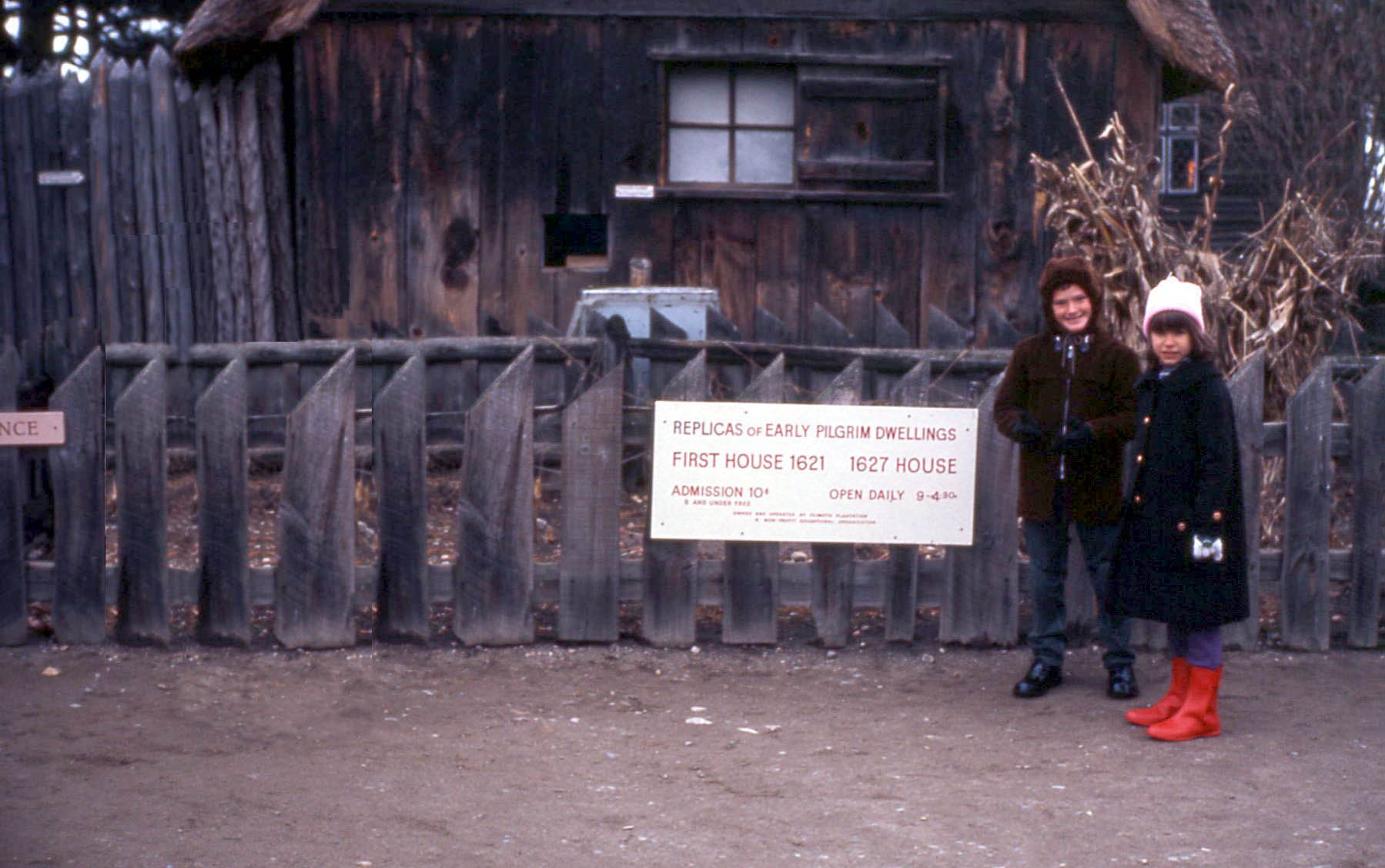
Pilgrim home

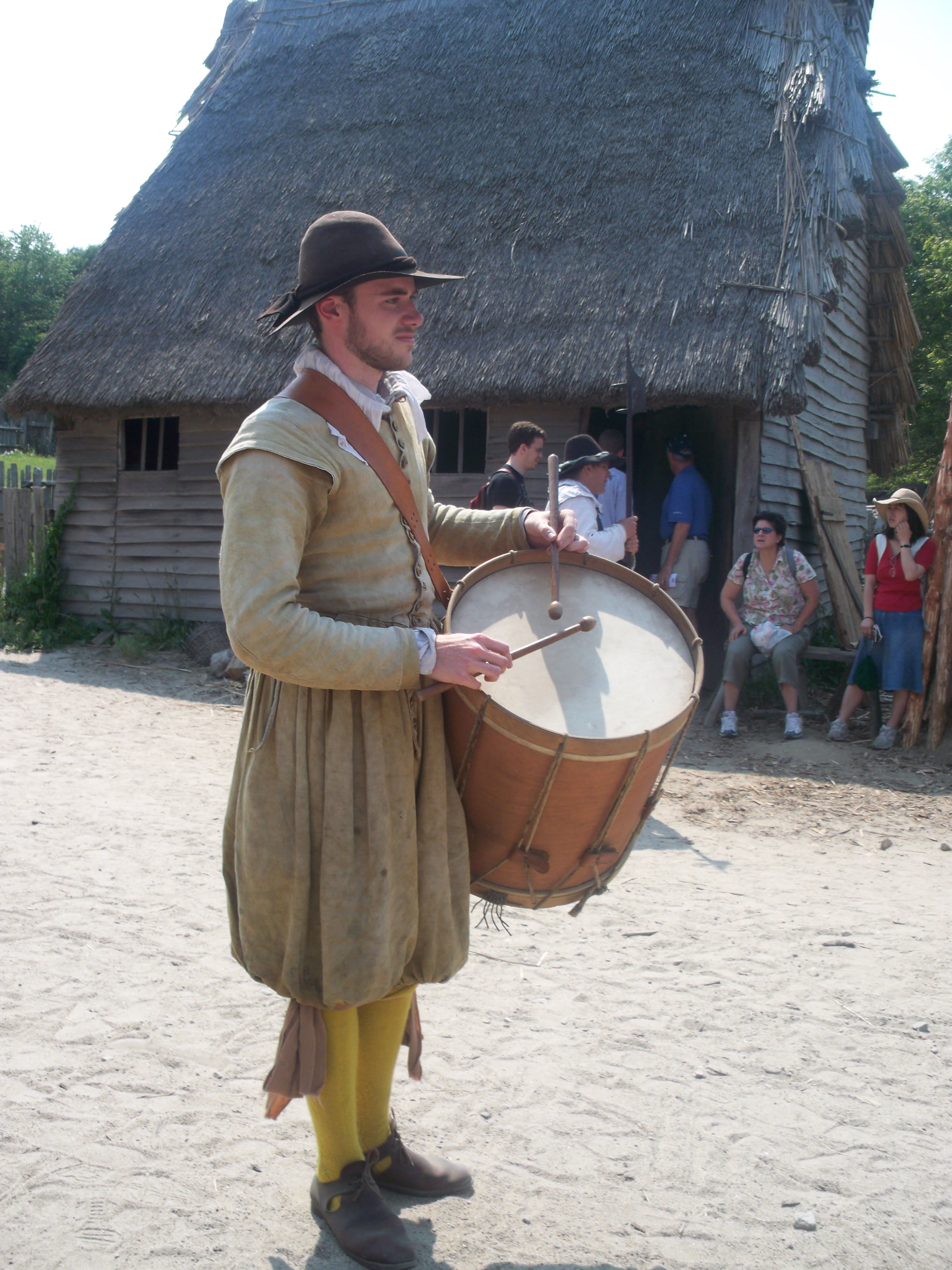
Drummer

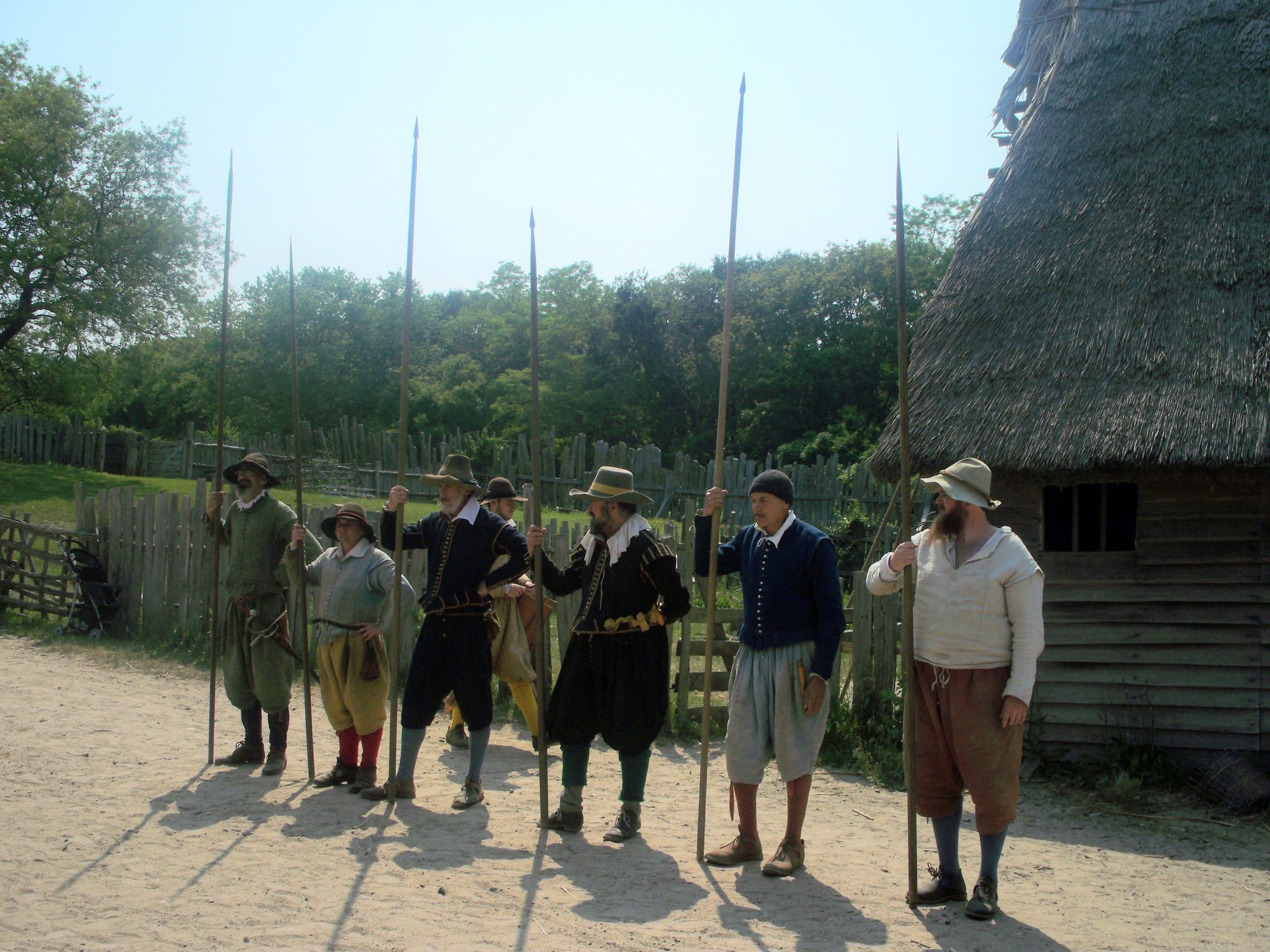

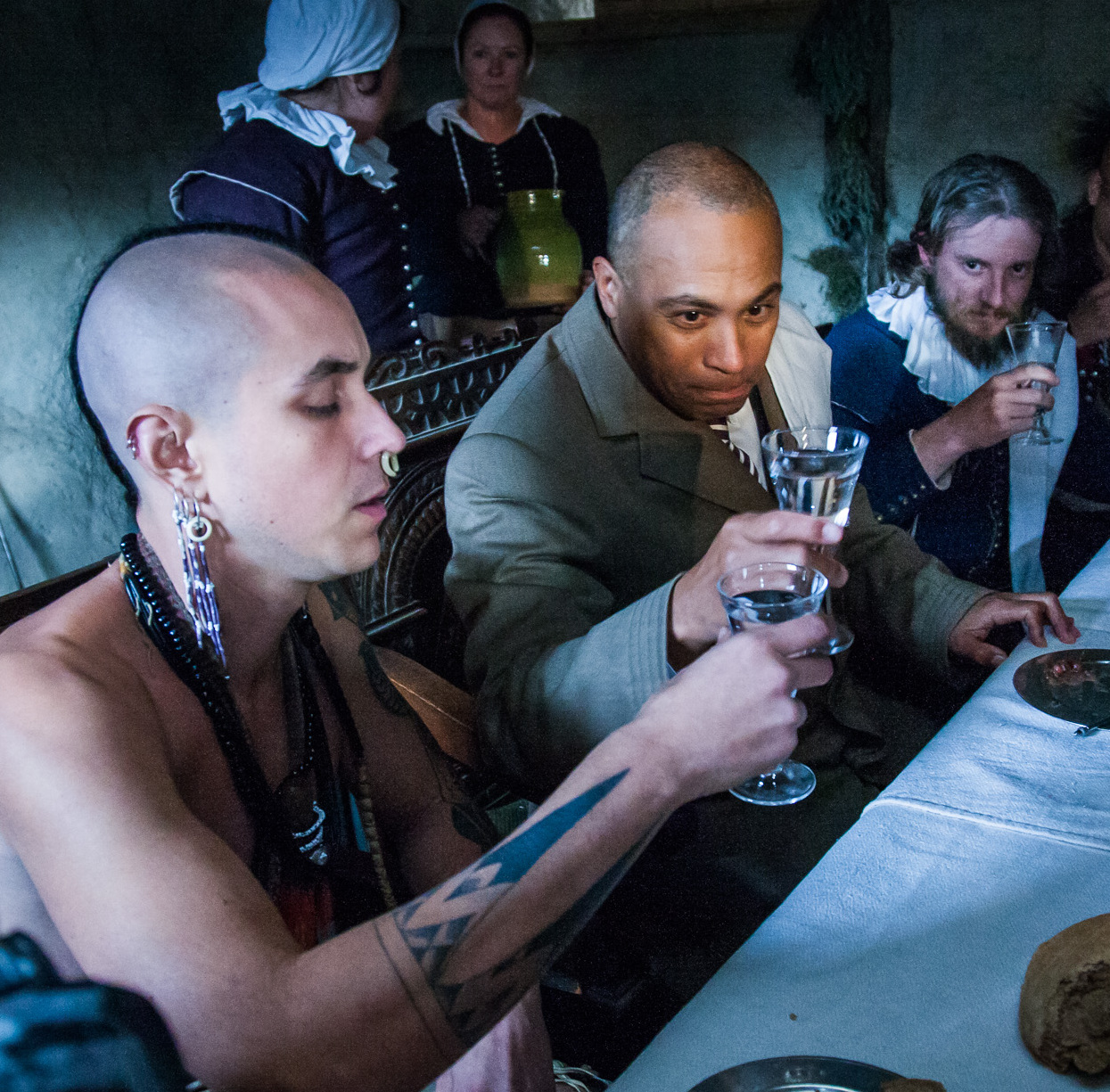
Massachusetts Governor Deval Patrick (center) during a 2011 visit
