= Chester Noyes Greenough =

American educator

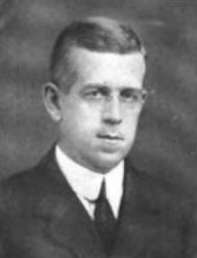

Dean of Harvard College
- In office 1921–1927
- Preceded by: Henry Yeomans
- Succeeded by: Alfred Hanford

Personal details
- Born: June 29, 1874 Wakefield, Massachusetts, U.S.
- Died: February 27, 1938 (aged 63) Belmont, Massachusetts, U.S.
- Education: Harvard University (BA, MA, PhD)

Academic work
- Discipline: English
- Institutions: University of Illinois; Harvard University

Chester Noyes Greenough (June 29, 1874 – February 27, 1938) was a Professor of English and Dean at Harvard University.

== Biography ==
Chester Noyes Greenough was born in Wakefield, Massachusetts, U.S., on June 29, 1874. He graduated from Harvard College in 1898, received his master's degree in 1899 and his doctorate in 1904, both from Harvard University. He taught at Harvard briefly before becoming head of the English Department at the University of Illinois in 1907. He returned to Harvard as Assistant Professor of English in 1910 and became Professor of English in 1915.

While serving a two-year term as acting Dean of Harvard College from 1919 to 1921, he played a principal role in Harvard's purge of homosexuals known as the Secret Court of 1920.

He held the post of Dean from 1921 to 1927. He became the first Master of Dunster House, a Harvard student residence, serving from 1930 to 1934.

One of his publications, History of Literature in America, which he authored with Barrett Wendell, became a popular textbook.

He married twice. His first wife, Marietta McPherson, died in 1925. He married Ruth Hornblower Atkins, who survived him, in 1931. He died in Belmont, Massachusetts, on February 27, 1938.

Greenough Hall, a Harvard dormitory, is named for him.
