= Rudolph Ruzicka =

Czech American wood engraver, etcher, illustrator, typeface designer and book designer

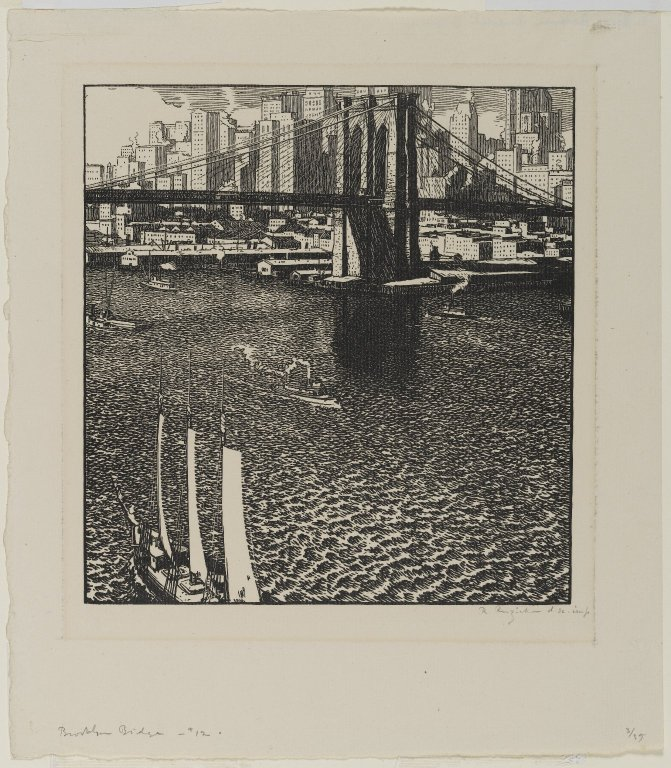
Brooklyn Bridge by Rudolph Ruzicka

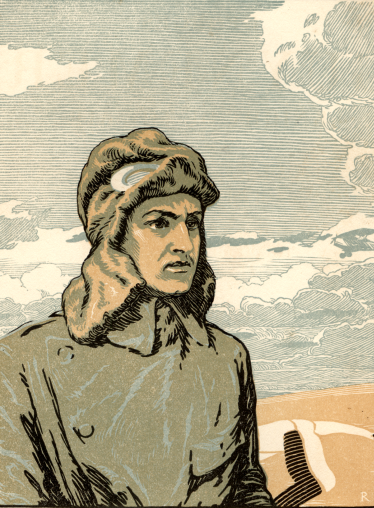
Georges Guynemer by Rudolph Ruzicka, 1918

Rudolph Ruzicka (29 June 1883 – 20 July 1978) was a Czech American wood engraver, etcher, illustrator, typeface designer, and book designer. Ruzicka designed typefaces and wood engraving illustrations for Daniel Berkeley Updike's Merrymount Press, and was a designer for, and consultant to, the Mergenthaler Linotype Company for fifty years. He designed a number of seals and medals, including the American Institute of Graphic Arts (AIGA) and the Dartmouth Medal of the American Library Association.

== Biography ==
Rudolph Ruzicka was born in Bohemia in 1883. He emigrated to the United States of America at age ten, living first in Chicago where he took drawing lessons at the Hull House School before becoming an apprentice wood engraver. From 1900 to 1902 he attended further classes at the Art Institute of Chicago. In 1903 he moved to New York to work as an engraver at the American Bank Note Company and at Calkins & Holden. In subsequent years he attended classes at both the Art Students League of New York and the New York School of Art.

In 1910 Ruzicka set up his own shop at 954 Lexington Avenue in New York City. He received his first major art commission from System magazine. Many exhibitions followed, including such venues as the Societe de la Gravure, Paris, the Grolier Club, and the Century Association. He published New York in collaboration with the Grolier Club --a series of thirty colored wood engravings that depicted the changes in architecture.

In 1916 Ruzicka built a house and a workshop in Dobbs Ferry, New York.

Ruzicka’s mastery of technique was viewed by William Ivins as one of the foremost American wood engravers as described in The Wood-Engravings of Rudolph Ruzicka.

In 1935 Ruzicka was awarded the Gold Medal from the American Institute of Graphic Arts, and in that same year began work with the Typographic Development staff at Mergenthaler Linotype Company, for which he was to produce typeface families.

He was in charge of finding antique and modern tools used for the printmaking processes for a display at the Department of Printing and Graphic Arts, Houghton Library at Harvard University. He often collaborated with Philip Hofer curator of the Department.

In 1948 he moved to Massachusetts, and eventually he settled in Vermont.

Over the years, D. B. Updike and Ruzicka collaborated on a number of well-respected book designs, including Newark and the Grolier Club's Irving, as well as a fine series of Merrymount Press annual keepsakes. Ruzicka also provided substantial consulting for Updike's book Printing Types. Today Ruzicka's art is collected in the Art Institute of Chicago, the Carnegie Institute, Library of Congress, the Brooklyn Institute of Arts and Sciences, and the Metropolitan Museum of Art, New York.

== Typefaces ==
- Lake Informal, designed for Linotype in 1935, though matrices were evidently never cut, as there is no record of this type having ever actually been cast in metal. Design later used for so-called "digital type" in 1993.
- Ruzicka Freehand, proposed designs made for Linotype in 1939 and never made into actual type. A digital knock-off of this design was made in 1993 by Ann Chaisson and Mark Altman.
- Fairfield series
  - Fairfield + Italic (Mergenthaler Linotype Company, 1940). Perhaps twenty digital variants of this face have been designed by Alex Kaczun for Linotype.
  - Fairfield Medium + Italic (Mergenthaler Linotype Company, 1949). A digital knock-off of this has been issued by Bitstream as Transitional 751.
- Primer + Italic (Mergenthaler Linotype Company, 1953), designed for legibility and to compete with A.T.F.'s Century Schoolbook. A digital knock-off of this has been issued by Bitstream as Century 751.

== See also ==
- List of AIGA medalists
