= Zephyr Books =

Swedish publishing imprint, 1942–1950

Zephyr Books. (Details)

Zephyr Books were published by The Continental Book Company, a subsidiary of the Swedish Bonnier Group, from 1942 to 1950. The imprint took its name from the Greek god of the western wind, indicating its speciality.

During World War II no books in English could be imported into Sweden. The Continental Book Company was established in 1942 with the object of publishing books in English in Stockholm. The intended market comprised Sweden and other parts of the European continent where it was possible to sell English books in spite of the war, namely Switzerland, Portugal and Turkey. Considerable quantities of Zephyr Books were also exported to Hungary, Italy, occupied Denmark and the non-occupied zone of France.

After the war it was decided to continue, and even expand, the series. The intention was to replace the English book series published by Tauchnitz before the war. The total destruction of the Leipzig book industry made it clear that Tauchnitz would not be able to start work again for some time. Sweden, on the other hand, had its means of production intact and abundant supplies of paper.

Publication was extended as fast as the continental market was reopened for freer trade, and the number of volumes was doubled within a year. The series was given a distinctive note by its "special volumes", such as its anthologies of prose and verse, and an edition of Lewis Carroll's "Alice in Wonderland" with illustrations by Mervyn Peake, which appeared as a Zephyr Book in 1946, two years before it was published in London.

Soon, however, competition from British and American publishers became too strong, and the publication of the Zephyr series ended in 1950. By then 167 volumes had been published.

The covers were colour-coded depending on the content: red for modern American authors, blue for modern English authors, green for classics, yellow for detective fiction and thrillers, grey for anthologies and special volumes, light blue for poetry and drama, and purple for memoirs and biographies.

== List of Zephyr Books ==
Book number	Author	Title	Years printed
001	Ernest Hemingway	A Farewell to Arms	1942, 1943, 1945, 1947
002	Dorothy Parker	After Such Pleasures	1942, 1943, 1944, 1946
003	Clarence Day	Life with Father	1942, 1944, 1945
004	Charles Morgan	The Voyage	1942, 1944, 1945
005	Christopher Morley	Kitty Foyle	1942
006	William Shakespeare	Six Plays	1943, 1946
007	John Steinbeck	Tortilla Flat	1942, 1943, 1945, 1947, 1949
008	Emily Brontë	Wuthering Heights	1943, 1945, 1946
009	Freeman Wills Crofts	The Pit-Prop Syndicate	1943, 1945
010	Dorothy Sayers	Murder Must Advertise	1943, 1944, 1946
011	Jane Austen	Pride and Prejudice	1943, 1945, 1947
012	Louis Bromfield	Twenty-four Hours	1943, 1944, 1946, 1949
013	Howard Spring	Fame is the Spur 1	1943, 1946
014	Howard Spring	Fame is the Spur 2	1943, 1946
015	Aldous Huxley	Brave New World	1943, 1944, 1945
016	John Steinbeck	The Moon is Down	1943, 1944, 1945, 1946, 1947
017	James Hilton	Random Harvest	1943, 1945
018	James Joyce	A Portrait of the Artist as a Young Man	1943, 1945
019	Dashiell Hammett	The Maltese Falcon	1943, 1946
020	Edna Ferber	Saratoga Trunk	1943, 1944, 1945
021	W. Somerset Maugham	Of Human Bondage 1	1943, 1945, 1949
022	W. Somerset Maugham	Of Human Bondage 2	1943, 1945, 1949
023	Robert Louis Stevenson	Treasure Island	1943
024	Dorothy Sayers	Clouds of Witness	1943, 1949
025	Lytton Strachey	Queen Victoria	1943, 1945
026	Ernest Hemingway	For Whom the Bell Tolls	1943, 1945, 1946
027	John Buchan	The Thirty-Nine Steps	1944, 1946
028	John Steinbeck	The Grapes of Wrath	1943, 1947, 1948
029	Cecil Scott Forester	The Happy Return	1944, 1945
030	Cecil Scott Forester	A Ship of the Line	1944, 1946
031	Cecil Scott Forester	Flying Colours	1944, 1946
032	Ngaio Marsh	Enter a Murderer	1944, 1945
033	P. G. Wodehouse	Money in the Bank	1943, 1945, 1946, 1947
034	Pearl Buck	Dragon Seed	1943, 1945, 1947
035	Mark Twain	Huckleberry Finn	1944, 1945
036	Ronald Fraser	Financial Times	1944, 1946
037	James Hilton	And Now Good-Bye	1944, 1946
038	William Makepeace Thackeray	Vanity Fair 1	1944, 1946, 1947
039	William Makepeace Thackeray	Vanity Fair 2	1944, 1946, 1947
040	Freeman Wills Crofts	Man Overboard!	1944, 1946
041	John Steinbeck	The Long Valley	1944, 1946, 1948
042	Charlotte Brontë	Jane Eyre	1944, 1947
043	Dorothy Parker	Laments for the Living	1944, 1946
044	Charles Nordhoff	Mutiny!	1944
045	John Boynton Priestley	Daylight on Saturday	1945
046	Nathaniel Hawthorne	The Scarlet Letter	1944, 1946
047	Dorothy Sayers	Lord Peter Views the Body	1944, 1946
048	Izaak Walton	The Compleat Angler	1945
049	Ellery Queen	The Roman Hat Mystery	1945, 1947
050	Charles Dickens	Oliver Twist	1944, 1947
051	Ebba Dalin, Editor	The Zephyr Book of American Verse	1945
052	Ebba Dalin, Editor	The Zephyr Book of American Prose	1945
053	Graham Greene	The Power and the Glory	1945, 1947, 1949
054	Marjorie Kinnan Rawlings	The Yearling	1945
055	William Saroyan	The Human Comedy	1944
056	George Meredith	The Egoist	1945, 1947
057	Lin Yutang	The Importance of Living	1944, 1945, 1948
058	Peter de Polnay	Water on the Steps	1944
059	Michael Sadleir	Fanny by Gaslight	1945
060	M. and R. Bottrall, Editors	The Zephyr Book of English Verse	1945, 1948
061	John Bunyan	The Pilgrim's Progress	1945, 1946, 1947
062	Anthony Berkeley	The Silk Stocking Murders	1946
063	George Eliot	Silas Marner	1945
064	Anthony Thorne	I'm a Stranger Here Myself	1945
065	Joyce Horner	The Wind and the Rain	1945, 1946
066	Elizabeth Gaskell	Cranford	1945
067	Lewis Carroll	Alice's Adventures in Wonderland and Through the Looking-Glass	1946
068	William Faulkner	The Wild Palms	1945, 1947
069	Oliver Goldsmith	The Vicar of Wakefield	1945, 1946
070	Jonathan Swift	Gulliver's Travels	1945
071	W. Somerset Maugham	The Razor's Edge	1945, 1948
072	Elizabeth Bowen	To the North	1946
073	Erskine Caldwell	God's Little Acre	1945
074	C. S. Forester	The Captain from Connecticut	1945
075	Charles Nordhoff	Botany Bay	1945
076	Stella Gibbons	The Rich House	1945
077	Nevil Shute	Pastoral	1945, 1946
078	John Steinbeck	Cannery Row	1945, 1946
079	G. K. Chesterton	The Scandal of Father Brown	1945
080	A. E. W. Mason	Musk and Amber	1946
081	Walter Van Tilburg Clark	The Ox-Bow Incident	1946
082	Dorothy Sayers	Unnatural Death	1946
083	John Steinbeck	Of Mice and Men	1945, 1948
084	G. K. Chesterton	Charles Dickens	1946
085	T. S. Eliot	Murder in the Cathedral	1945, 1948
086	Erskine Caldwell	Tobacco Road	1945, 1947
087	Dorothy Sayers	The Unpleasantness at the Bellona Club	1948, 1950
088	Harold Nicolson	Some People	1946
089	Graham Greene	A Gun for Sale	1947
090	Margaret Storm Jameson	Cousin Honoré	19??
091	Francis Iles	Malice Aforethought	1946
092	Dorothy Sayers	Strong Poison	1949
093	Ernest Raymond	We, the Accused	1946
094	Cecil Scott Forester	The Ship	1945, 1946
095	John Buchan	The Three Hostages	1947
096	Ernest Raymond	For Them that Trespass	1947
097	Oscar Wilde	An Ideal Husband and The Importance of Being Earnest	1946
098	Helen MacInnes	Above Suspicion	1947
099	Christine Weston	Indigo	1947
100	Artur Lundkvist, Editor	Twelve Modern Poets	1946
101	James Aldridge	Signed with Their Honour	1945
102	Kate O'Brien	The Last of Summer	1948
103	Rachel Field	And Now Tomorrow	1945
104	Edith Sitwell	The English Eccentrics	1947
105	Pearl Buck	The Promise	1945
106	Mark Twain	The Adventures of Tom Sawyer	1948
107	John Boynton Priestley	Black-out in Gretley	1945
108	E. X. Ferrars	Neck in a Noose	1947
109	Osbert Sitwell	Open the Door	1947
110	Frank Tilsley	I'd do it Again	1947
111	Kate O'Brien	The Land of Spices	1947
112	Carson McCullers	The Heart is a Lonely Hunter	1947
113	Mignon G. Eberhart	Speak no Evil	1947, 1948
114	Charles R. Jackson	The Lost Weekend	1946
115	Osbert Sitwell	Before the Bombardment	19??
116	Rose Franken	Claudia	1945
117	Eudora Welty	A Curtain of Green	1947
118	Carson McCullers	Reflections in a Golden Eye	1947
119	Phyllis Bottome	The Mortal Storm	1947
120	William Faulkner	Sanctuary	1947
121	Mignon G. Eberhart	Wings of Fear	1947
122	Charles Dickens	David Copperfield 1	1947
123	Charles Dickens	David Copperfield 2	1947
124	George Moore	Esther Waters	1947
125	Gertrude Stein	The Autobiography of Alice B. Toklas	1947
126	Christopher Isherwood	Goodbye to Berlin	1947
127	Walter De la Mare	Memoirs of a Midget	1948
128	A. E. W. Mason	Königsmark	1947
129	Robert Louis Stevenson	Dr. Jekyll and Mr. Hyde	1950
130	Jane Austen	Emma	1947
131	Walter de la Mare	The Return	1948
132	Edgar Allan Poe	Tales of Mystery & Imagination	1947
133	Edward Morgan Forster	Howards End	1948
137	David Cecil	The Young Melbourne	1949
139	Bruce Marshall	All Glorious Within	1946
140	Nevil Shute	Most Secret	1947
144	Eugene O'Neill	Mourning Becomes Electra	1948
146	Ernest Hemingway	The Sun Also Rises	1947
147	Daphne Du Maurier	Hungry Hill	1946, 1947
148	Raymond Chandler	The Big Sleep	1947
149	Edison Marshall	Benjamin Blake	1946
151	Christopher Isherwood	Prater Violet	1946
152	Nevil Shute	Pied Piper	1947
153	Samuel Shellabarger	Captain from Castile 1	1947
154	Samuel Shellabarger	Captain from Castile 2	1947
155	Nigel Balchin	Mine Own Executioner	1948
156	P. G. Wodehouse	Joy in the Morning	1947
157	Edmund Wilson	Memoirs of Hecate County	1947
158	Henry James	The Aspern Papers	1947
159	Henry James	The Turn of the Screw	1947
161	Erskine Childers	The Riddle of the Sands	1948
162	Raymond Chandler	The Lady in the Lake	1948
166	John Masefield	Sard Harker	19??
167	Irving Stone	Lust for Life 1	1949
168	Irving Stone	Lust for Life 2	1949
169	George Hopley	Night has a thousand eyes	1948
170	Margaret Storm Jameson	The Other Side	1947
179	Dorothy Sayers	Have his Carcase	1948
180	William Saroyan	The Daring Young Man on the Flying Trapeze	1948
181	Kenneth Fearing	The Big Clock	1948
188	H. E. Bates	A House of Women	1948
199	John O'Hara	Appointment in Samarra	1948
201	Raymond Chandler	The High Window	1948
209	William Sansom	Fireman Flower and Other Stories	1949
211	Denys Val Baker	The White Rock	1948
223	Carter Dickson	She Died a Lady	1948
227	James Hilton	Contango	1948
228	W. Somerset Maugham	The Gentleman in the Parlour	1949
229	Ernest Hemingway	To Have and Have Not	1947
230	Betty MacDonald	The Egg and I	1949
