= Val Biro =

Illustrator, artist and children's writer

Balint Stephen Biro (Budapest, October 6, 1921 – July 4, 2014) was a children's author, artist and illustrator. He received his education in Budapest and London. From about 1955 he lived in Chesham, where he helped to found the Chesham Society, and then moved to Amersham about 1971 until 1985.

== Writing ==
From an interview in the early 1970s:

"My writing is mainly concerned with my vintage car "Gumdrop." It was four years ago that my publishers suggested that it was about time that I wrote a book for children and not merely illustrate one; and I decided on Gumdrop as the main character.

"I write so as to give my alter-ego a good chance for drawing pictures, though I find that the story I invent tends to run away with itself, leaving me, the illustrator, behind! Each story tends to be based on personal experience and, equally, each tends to grow out of that into the imagination. Each book seems to take a few months to gestate, and then I write it in one long day (or night)."

== Illustration ==
In the 1950s and 1960s Biro illustrated many book covers for famous authors such as Nigel Tranter and Nevil Shute (Requiem for a Wren, Round the Bend, The Far Country and Beyond the Black Stump). For C.S. Forester, publishing with Michael Joseph, Biro made cover illustrations of several first editions: Mr. Midshipman Hornblower, Lieutenant Hornblower, Hornblower and the Atropos, Hornblower in the West Indies and Randall and the River of Time. In 1965 for Hamish Hamilton he illustrated the first edition of Angler's Moon by Leo Walmsley. He illustrated the hardback first edition of The Child From the Sea by Elizabeth Goudge in 1970. He also illustrated covers for Radio Times.

== Gumdrop ==
The real-life Gumdrop as driven by the author on 27 July 2008

Gumdrop is the name of an Austin Clifton Heavy Twelve-Four of 1926, the title character of a series of books authored by Val Biro, who owned an example. The stories revolve around the car and his owner, initially the younger Bill McArran, but for most of the series, the more senior Mr Oldcastle (later joined by a dog, Horace). The plots often involve the search for replacement parts for Gumdrop. Biro wrote the stories from the late 1960s to the 1980s. The main series of books, all fully illustrated in colour by Biro, ran to at least seventeen titles, with a further twelve (at least) "Gumdrop Little Books" also published in the 1980s. Whilst Gumdrop's adventures are fictional, the car is not. Biro and Gumdrop were frequent visitors to car shows and other events in Sussex and surrounding area. Biro was seen driving Gumdrop in the television documentary 100 Year Old Drivers, broadcast on ITV on 13 August 2014, shortly after Biro's death.

== Other works ==
- Yellow Boots
