= Lonely Road =

Lonely Road, Lonely Roads or The Lonely Road may refer to:

== Films ==
- Lonely Road (film), a 1936 British drama based on Shute's novel
- The Lonely Road (film), a 1923 American drama

== Music ==
=== Albums ===
- Lonely Road (album), a 2009 album by the Red Jumpsuit Apparatus
- Lonely Road, a 1988 album by Denny Laine
- The Lonely Road, album by jazz guitarist David Becker

=== Songs ===
- "Lonely Road" (Machine Gun Kelly and Jelly Roll song), 2024
- "Lonely Road" (Paul McCartney song), 2002
- "Lonely Road", by the Red Jumpsuit Apparatus, 2009
- "Lonely Roads", by King Combs, North West, and Kanye West, 2025

== Literature ==
- Lonely Road (novel), a novel by Nevil Shute
- Lonely Road Books, an American small-press publisher
