= Marcus Clarke (doctor) =

Australian medical doctor

- Born: Marcus Carlyle Clarke; 9 June 1912
- Died: 20 November 2000 (aged 88)
- Occupations: Doctor, surgeon, biographer
- Writing career
- Pen name: Derwent Kell

Marcus Carlyle Clarke (9 June 1912 – 20 November 2000) was an Australian medical doctor who at the age of 23 was appointed District Surgeon, North Borneo, based at Kudat after answering an advertisement in the Medical Journal of Australia in 1938. After an eventful year in Kudat, he was transferred to Sandakan as Port Health Officer, then to Keningau as District Surgeon, Beaufort and the Interior.

It was here that Clarke was stationed as tensions rose in Southeast Asia in 1940–1941. Clarke recorded his experiences of capture, working as a doctor under the Japanese in Brunei and his eventual incarceration in Batu Lintang camp, an internment camp in Kuching, Sarawak under the pen-name Derwent Kell, in the book A Doctor's Borneo, In Peace and War published in 1984. He wrote under a pseudonym, because he said his "real name was pre-empted by a well-known professional writer", a reference to Australian author Marcus Clarke.

This is one of the very few accounts of life under the Japanese in Brunei.

== Nevil Shute ==
On Nevil Shute's trip to Australia, he offered to fly the local Cairns doctor, Clarke, on his rounds in Northern Queensland. Based on accounts from his daughter, Bev Clarke, it is likely Marcus partly inspired the characters of Jean Paget and Joe Harman in his famous book A Town Like Alice. Paget’s role sees her being captured in Malaya when the Japanese invaded and she wishes to return and help the people who helped save her life. It was on this trip that Shute met Jimmie Edwards (Ringer Edwards), whose wartime experiences of capture, torture, and crucifixion (which he survived) by the Japanese are usually credited to have inspired the character of Joe Harman. Harman meets and marries Paget in the book.

During the trip with Shute around the Gulf country they arrived in one township—just in time for Clarke to deliver a baby. The baby was christened Nevil Marcus. Clarke wondered why Shute had been accorded the primary honour given he had done all the work.

A doctor in one of Shute's books was apparently based on Clarke, perhaps the young country doctor, Dr. Turnbull, in The Rainbow and the Rose or perhaps Carl Zlinter in The Far Country.

== Bibliography ==
- Kell, Derwent (1984). A Doctor's Borneo. Boolarong Publications. ISBN 0-908175-80-9.
