= The Far Country (novel) =

1952 novel by Nevil Shute

- First edition (Heinemann)
- Author: Nevil Shute
- Language: English
- Genre: Fiction
- Publisher: Heinemann
- Publication date: 1952
- Publication place: Australia
- Media type: Print
- Pages: 326 pp.
- Preceded by: Round the Bend
- Followed by: In the Wet

The Far Country is a novel by Nevil Shute, first published in 1952.

In this novel, Shute has some harsh things to say about the new (British) National Health Service, as well as the socialist Labour government of 1945-1951, themes he would later develop more fully in In the Wet. He describes the lot of the 'New Australians'; refugees who are required to work for two years where they are placed, in return for free passage to Australia.

== Plot summary ==
The story takes place partly in London and partly in Australia. It is set in 1950. Jennifer Morton, a young girl from Leicester but living in London, witnesses the death of her grandmother, the widow of a retired Indian civil servant. Her pension has ceased and she has literally starved to death, despite once being prosperous. Before she dies, she leaves Jennifer a small sum of money sent by a niece in Australia, and asks that Jennifer use the money to visit Jane and Jack Dorman who own a prosperous sheep station in Merrijig Victoria. She does so.

Jennifer finds herself falling in love with the new, relatively unspoiled country, though she continues to worry about her parents. She also meets Carl Zlinter, a 'New Australian'; a Czech refugee who is working at the nearby lumber camp of a timber company as a condition of his free passage to Australia. A medical doctor qualified to practise in Czechoslovakia, he is not qualified to practise in Australia and only looks after First Aid at the lumber camp but when an accident badly injures two of the workers and no doctor, nurse or medical facilities are available, he is faced with the choice of either watching the workers die or operating on them; he chooses to operate, and Jennifer assists him. The two operations are successful, but one man later gets drunk and dies. Zlinter is initially in potentially serious trouble over the unlicensed operations and death, but he is cleared of responsibility.

Jennifer helps Zlinter to trace the history of a man of the same name who lived and died in the district many years before, during a gold rush, and they find the site of his house.

Back in England, Jennifer's mother dies and she is forced to return, but she is now restless and dissatisfied. Zlinter turns up in Leicester; he has found gold dust that the earlier Zlinter earned as a bullock driver and hid beneath a stone. He has used the money from illegally selling the gold to travel to England to ask Jennifer to marry him, and to re-qualify as a medical practitioner.

== Inspiration ==
The character of Carl Zlinter may have been inspired by Dr Marcus Clarke, whom Nevil Shute accompanied in 1948 on his rounds as a country doctor in Cairns, Australia.

The character of Billy Slim was based on Fred Fry, a notable fly fisherman, who constructed several huts along the Howqua River and eked out a quiet existence in the river valley.

== Title ==
The title comes from the 40th poem (in Roman numerals XL) in A.E. Housman's A Shropshire Lad.

Into my heart an air that kills
From yon far country blows:
What are those blue remembered hills,
What spires, what farms are those?

That is the land of lost content,
I see it shining plain,
The happy highways where I went
And cannot come again.

== Critical reception ==
Writing in The Bulletin a reviewer was rather unimpressed with the work: "As an ingenious stringing-together of a varied set of subjects of present-day interest, it is more readable than a series of articles would be ; as a novel, it makes good journalism."

In The Herald (Melbourne) reviewer Osmar White was more taken with the work: "By all means read The Far Country as soon as you can get hold of it. It'll make you feel fine if you're an Australian and a hero if you're an Englishman — or a Czech...We need more writers who count our blessings as determinedly as Mr. Shute."

== 1987 adaptation ==
The novel was adapted for television again in the 1980s. The miniseries screened on the Seven Network in 1987 starring Michael York, Sigrid Thornton, and Maureen Edwards as Mrs Morton. Shooting took place in September and October 1985, and took place entirely in Victoria even though some scenes were set in Britain and Europe.

=== Cast ===
- Michael York
- Sigrid Thornton
- Maureen Edwards as Mrs Morton
- Sue Jones as Betty Marshall

== See also ==
- Immigration to Australia
