= The Pied Piper (1942 film) =

1942 film by Irving Pichel

- Original movie poster
- Directed by: Irving Pichel
- Screenplay by: Nunnally Johnson
- Based on: Pied Piper by Nevil Shute
- Produced by: Nunnally Johnson
- Starring: Monty Woolley; Anne Baxter; Roddy McDowall
- Cinematography: Edward Cronjager
- Edited by: Allen McNeil
- Music by: Alfred Newman
- Distributed by: 20th Century Fox
- Release date: August 21, 1942
- Running time: 87 min.
- Country: United States
- Language: English
- Box office: $1.5 million (US rentals)

The Pied Piper is a 1942 American war drama film in which an Englishman on vacation in France is caught up in the German invasion of that country, and finds himself taking an ever-growing group of children to safety. It stars Monty Woolley, Roddy McDowall and Anne Baxter. The film was adapted by Nunnally Johnson from the 1942 novel of the same name by Nevil Shute. It was directed by Irving Pichel.

It was nominated for Academy Award for Best Picture, Monty Woolley for Best Actor in a Leading Role, and Edward Cronjager for Best Cinematography, Black-and-White.

== Plot ==
In June 1940, Howard goes to France, near the border with Switzerland, to sulk after his offer to serve in the Second World War is turned down by every government department in London because he is too old. (It is later revealed that his son, a Royal Air Force pilot, was shot down and killed two months earlier.) When Germany invades France, he is determined to go home to do his bit. Mrs. Cavanaugh decides to accompany her husband, a League of Nations official, to his post in Geneva, but fearing that the Germans will invade Switzerland next, she asks Howard to take her two young children, Ronnie and Sheila, to her sister in Plymouth. Howard reluctantly agrees, as he does not like children, especially Ronnie, who annoys him by contradicting his claim that Rochester is an American state.

They take the train from St. Claude, but have to debark at Joigny. No more trains are running north, as the Germans have broken through the Allied lines. When they board a bus to Chartres, Ronnie, without Howard's knowledge, brings along the French girl Rose (at her aunt's request) to take to her father in London, much to Howard's annoyance. As they near Chartres, German airplanes attack the stream of refugees on the road, killing many. They start walking. When they stop for the night, Howard discovers they have acquired a young boy named Pierre. He was a fellow bus passenger, and his parents are among the dead.

They reach Chartres, just before the Germans seize the city. When Howard seeks help from his acquaintance Nicole Rougeron, he finds he now has five charges, the newest addition being Willem, a Dutch boy. Nicole takes them away just before the Germans, tipped off that there is an Englishman there, search the Rougeron home. They board a train to the Brittany coast. On the way, Nicole reveals to Howard that she spent three blissful days with his son.

In Landerneau, Nicole appeals to her uncle Aristide, who owns fishing boats. Initially suspicious, he finds a man, Focquet, willing to take them to England. However, on their way through the German-occupied town, Sheila gets into a fight with Rose and speaks English within earshot of a German soldier. They are all captured at the boat and taken to Major Diessen.

Diessen is certain Howard is working for British Army intelligence, using the children as a cover. He has Howard watch the execution of a spy. Howard offers to confess to anything Diessen wants if he will release the others. Finally, Diessen makes him a totally unexpected private proposal. He will release everyone, including Howard, if he will take another child with him, his seven-year-old niece. Her father, Diessen's younger brother, was killed in Belgium, and the Nazis discovered his wife was Jewish. The woman has been dealt with, but Diessen wants to save the child by having her taken to his older brother, a naturalized American citizen living in ... Rochester. Just in case, Diessen will keep an eye on Nicole, who refuses to leave France. Howard counters by threatening to reveal Diessen's dealings with him if Nicole is harmed.

Later, safely home, Howard is asked at his club if he "had much difficulty getting back?" He replies, "No ... not too much."

== Cast ==
- Monty Woolley as Howard
- Roddy McDowall as Ronnie
- Anne Baxter as Nicole Rougeron
- Otto Preminger as Major Diessen
- J. Carrol Naish as Aristide Rougeron
- Lester Matthews as Mr. Cavanaugh
- Jill Esmond as Mrs. Cavanaugh
- Ferike Boros as Madame
- Peggy Ann Garner as Sheila
- Merrill Rodin as Willem
- Maurice Tauzin as Pierre
- Fleurette Zama as Rose
- William Edmunds as Frenchman
- Marcel Dalio as Focquet
- Marcelle Corday as Madame Bonne
- Odette Myrtil as Madame Rougeron
- Jean Del Val as Railroad Official
- Rudolph Anders as Lieutenant (as Robert O. Davis)
- Henry Rowland as Military Police
- Helmut Dantine as Aide
- George Davis as Barman

== Reception ==
The New York Times review stated that "they have made a charming and moving testament against the background of the war. Their 'The Pied Piper' is also irresistably entertaining," complaining only that Preminger's "conventionally arrogant Nazi" seemed out of place. On the review aggregator website Rotten Tomatoes, 100% of 8 critics' reviews are positive.
