= The Seafarer =

The Seafarer may refer to the following:

- The Seafarer (play), a play by Conor McPherson
- "The Seafarer" (poem), an Old English poem
- The Seafarers, a short film by Stanley Kubrick
- The Seafarers (novel), a novel by Nevil Shute
- Catan: Seafarers, an expansion of the board game The Settlers of Catan
- Seafarer Glacier, Victoria Land, Antarctica

== See also ==
- Sailor
