= Beyond the Black Stump =

1956 novel by Nevil Shute

- First UK edition
- Author: Nevil Shute
- Cover artist: Val Biro
- Language: English
- Publisher: Heinemann (UK); William Morrow (US)
- Publication date: 1956
- Publication place: United Kingdom
- Media type: Print (Hardback & Paperback)

Beyond the Black Stump is a novel by British author Nevil Shute. It was first published in the UK by William Heinemann Ltd, in 1956.

== Plot summary ==
The story concerns a young American geologist, Stanton Laird, working in the Australian outback in the field of oil exploration. Although he is in a very remote location - beyond the black stump - in a region called "the Lunatic" in Western Australia, he is part of a crew that has a well-appointed mobile facility.

He is befriended by a local farming family, the Regans, and develops a relationship with their daughter Mollie. The Regans run an enormously profitable station, but their domestic lifestyle is somewhat unconventional, with the two Regan brothers at one time having Mollie's mother move from one to the other without bothering to get a divorce. The family is large and even larger when counting the biracial children produced by both fathers. The children are taught by the Judge, an English exile and alcoholic, who gives the children an excellent education and keeps the finances of the station. Over the course of the explorations (which proved unsuccessful), he notes the unique lifestyle on what amounts to the Australian frontier, and falls in love with Mollie. The two wish to wed, but Mollie's mother insists that Mollie first see how the Lairds live in their Oregon town, Hazel, which was once on the frontier, but is no longer, though its citizens take pride in feeling that it still is.

The two travel to Hazel. At first, Mollie gets along well in the Laird family home. But then Stanton's one-time love, Ruth, the widow of Stanton's best friend, returns to Hazel with her children. The oldest son bears a tremendous resemblance to Stanton, and Stanton is moved to confess to Mollie both that the son may be his, and that he killed a girl in a drunken accident as a teenager. Mollie is unconcerned about the boy—such things are common where she comes from—but is concerned about the accident, and about Stanton's lack of remorse for the dead girl. As Stanton expected Mollie to care very much about the boy, and did not expect her to be so concerned about the girl, the two begin to realize they have a very different outlook on life.

Soon, Mollie comes to realize that she will never fit in while in Hazel, and does not particularly want to. Her place is on the true frontier, in the Lunatic, not in Hazel. She returns to Australia, where she will likely marry a young neighbour, an emigrant from England, who has long loved her. Stanton is likely to marry Ruth, as Mollie suggests he should. Stanton has a wedding present for Mollie, though—his final report reveals that the neighbour's impoverished lands lie over great quantities of artesian water, which will allow the neighbour—and Mollie—to flourish.

== Location ==
According to the co-ordinates for the oil exploration given in the final pages of the novel—23 degrees 5 minutes South, 118 degrees 51 minutes East—most of the story is set in the Ophthalmia Range in the Pilbara region of Western Australia, roughly halfway between where the towns of Paraburdoo and Newman are today. The Eastern Oregon town that Shute calls "Hazel" seems to be the town of Joseph, or possibly La Grande, at the foot of the Wallowa Mountains, which contains the Eagle Cap Wilderness Area.
