= No Highway in the Sky =

1951 aviation film by Henry Koster

- Theatrical release poster
- Directed by: Henry Koster
- Screenplay by: R. C. Sherriff; Oscar Millard; Alec Coppel
- Based on: No Highway by Nevil Shute
- Produced by: Louis D. Lighton
- Starring: James Stewart; Marlene Dietrich; Glynis Johns; Jack Hawkins; Janette Scott; Elizabeth Allan; Ronald Squire; Jill Clifford
- Cinematography: Georges Périnal
- Edited by: Manuel del Campo
- Music by: Malcolm Arnold
- Production company: Twentieth Century-Fox Film Corp.
- Distributed by: Twentieth Century-Fox Film Corp.
- Release dates: 28 June 1951 (United Kingdom); 21 September 1951 (United States)
- Running time: 98 minutes
- Countries: United Kingdom; United States
- Language: English
- Box office: $1.1 million (US rentals)

No Highway in the Sky (also known as No Highway) is a 1951 black-and-white aviation drama film directed by Henry Koster from a screenplay by R. C. Sherriff, Oscar Millard, and Alec Coppel, based on the 1948 novel No Highway by Nevil Shute. The film stars James Stewart, Marlene Dietrich, Glynis Johns, Jack Hawkins, Janette Scott, Elizabeth Allan, Ronald Squire, and Jill Clifford.

It was one of the first films that depicted a potential aviation disaster involving metal fatigue. Although the film follows the plot of Shute's novel in general, No Highway in the Sky notably omits references to the supernatural contained in the original novel, including the use of automatic writing to resolve a key element in the original novel's story. Also, the role of Scott, the recently appointed administrator who narrates the novel, is curtailed in the film version; which means that the featured scientist, Mr Honey, comes across as more eccentric than in the novel, changing the relationship between them.

The film also introduces the term "boffin" for the under-appreciated and seemingly self-centred and eccentric scientist, as distinct from earlier usage to describe a scientist who is making vital (and appreciated) contributions.

== Plot ==
Dennis Scott, new chief of metallurgy at the Royal Aircraft Establishment at Farnborough, is introduced to Theodore Honey, an eccentric American scientist who is testing his theory that the new Rutland Reindeer aircraft is susceptible to structural failure of the tailplane. Honey is running a fatigue test on the tail assembly of a Reindeer, using a very high vibration rate dynamic shaker in an eight-hour daily test cycle (determined by complaints from neighbours). Eventually, it will fall off.

Scott gives Honey a ride home and learns that he is a widower whose wife was killed by a V2 rocket during the war. The perfect embodiment of the absent-minded professor, Honey has educated his brilliant but reserved 12-year-old daughter, Elspeth, at home, without any real understanding of a child's need for play and friends. Honey tells Scott he expects failure to occur after 1440 flight hours. Scott notes that commercial planes are building up miles faster than the experiment, and Honey becomes very upset, declaring that he is a scientist, he cannot be concerned about people.

In the company bar, Scott runs into a test pilot, an old friend from WWII, who tells him about the recent crash of a Reindeer in Labrador. The plane had flown 1407 hours. The tail was never found, the pilot was blamed, and Scott suspects Honey's theory is correct. He informs Sir John, the head of RAE, who puts the vibration test on a 24-hour basis.

Honey is sent to Labrador to examine the wreckage, but finds himself flying across the Atlantic on a Reindeer airliner. He was told that all Reindeer have only 500 hours in service, but is shocked to learn that this early production aircraft had already logged 1422 hours at takeoff. Despite the fact that his theory is not yet proven, he warns the captain, who contacts London for advice. Honey also shows the safest place to survive a crash to renowned Hollywood actress Monica Teasdale, who meant a great deal to his wife. Teasdale believes Honey and through a night of waiting she grows close to him, as does stewardess Marjorie Corder.

The Reindeer lands safely at Gander Airport in Newfoundland, and an inspection clears it to continue on its route. Honey takes drastic action to stop the flight by retracting the landing gear, dropping the aircraft on its belly and wrecking it. Honey is detained, and Corder offers to go to Elspeth when she returns to England.

The next day, Teasdale speaks to Honey's superiors on his behalf. Sir John promises to seek the truth. However, there are powerful men who demand that Honey be repudiated to discredit his unproved theory and to save the reputation of British passenger aviation, which is now awash in a sea of bad press. Sir John tells a shaken Honey that he must undergo psychological testing. Honey goes home to find the house in order and Corder spending the night with Elspeth.

Teasdale, who has also been helping Elspeth, abruptly leaves for California, deliberately allowing space for any romance between Corder and Honey to develop. Honey returns to his experiment but the 1440th hour soon passes without any structural failure. Corder is angered by his readiness to surrender and his failure to see how Elspeth is suffering.

During a board meeting, Sir David questions Honey's sanity. Honey finally objects, refusing to be railroaded. He resigns and threatens to protest at the departure of every Rutland Reindeer—and collapse them, too. He walks out. At home, Corder worries what he will live on and discovers that he has not deposited his salary in the bank for seven months. Laughing and crying, she says he has to have someone to look after him. She is going to marry him.

Meanwhile, the Reindeer that Honey disabled is repaired, but the tail falls off after its next landing. The tail spar is found in Labrador, showing metal fatigue. Scott, Sir John and Corder run to tell Honey in his lab and there is a horrific crashing noise as the tail separates, at last. Honey realizes that he failed to account for temperature fluctuations to affect the timing of the Reindeer's tail failures.

== Cast ==
- James Stewart as Theodore Honey
- Marlene Dietrich as Monica Teasdale
- Glynis Johns as Marjorie Corder, stewardess
- Jack Hawkins as Dennis Scott, chief of metallurgy at RAE
- Janette Scott as Elspeth Honey
- Elizabeth Allan as Shirley Scott
- Ronald Squire as Sir John, a director of RAE
- Jill Clifford as Peggy, stewardess

Uncredited

- Niall MacGinnis as Captain Samuelson, pilot
- Kenneth More as Dobson, co-pilot
- Dora Bryan as Rosie, barmaid
- Felix Aylmer as Sir Philip, a director of RAE
- Maurice Denham as Major Pearl
- Wilfrid Hyde-White as Fisher, Inspector of Accidents
- John Lennox as Farnborough director
- Bessie Love as aircraft passenger
- Arthur Lucas as Farnborough director
- Pete Murray as radio operator

== Production ==
The fictional Rutland Reindeer airliner in No Highway in the Sky was depicted by using a full-size, non-flying mock-up and a studio scale model for use in special effects mattes.

The first writer who worked on the script was R. C. Sherriff. The story was then assigned to producer Buddy Lighton, who hired Oscar Millard to do the screenplay. Millard said he spent six months writing the script without ever looking at a Sheriff draft. In London, the producer Buddy Lighton hired Alec Coppel to rewrite some scenes that were based at the Farnborough Aircraft Establishment.

The actor Robert Donat was originally cast in the lead role, but when the deal fell through, James Stewart was cast. This would be the second pairing of Stewart with Marlene Dietrich, the first being 1939's Destry Rides Again.

No Highway in the Sky, the film's working title, became the theatrical release title for English-speaking countries apart from the UK, where it retained the novel title No Highway. As noted in contemporary sources, filming took place in 1950 at Denham Studios, with location shooting at Blackbushe Airport in Hampshire, England, although the scene with a Gloster E.1/44 prototype was possibly staged at Boscombe Down.

In November 1950, The Hollywood Reporter claimed that Stewart underwent an emergency appendectomy in London while the film was in production.

Director Koster called it "one of my finest pictures. I thought it was a marvelous story and I had a marvelous script by very fine writers".

== Reception ==
The film was popular at the British box office. 20th Century Fox were so impressed with Kenneth More's performance they arranged for him to be tested for other films but did not use him.

Reviews of No Highway in the Sky were decidedly mixed. Bosley Crowther of The New York Times wrote a favourable review, noting the film's "... sly construction of an unusual plot and wry suspense".

In a more recent appraisal, reviewer Dennis Schwartz opined:

American military war hero pilot James Stewart plays the eccentric Yank scientist working for a British airline [Stewart's character was not actually working for an airline but rather the government RAE Farnborough.], and it gives one of his better and more pleasing performances as someone kindhearted but a bit daffy. ... The one-dimensional characters add no emotional depth, especially when the awkward romance is tossed onto the airplane drama, but Stewart plays a likable character that translates into a rather genial pic with much appeal.

Three years after the film, and six years after the publication of Nevil Shute's original novel (No Highway), there were two fatal crashes of the world's first jet passenger airliner, the de Havilland Comet. Investigation found that metal fatigue was the cause of both accidents, albeit in the main fuselage and not the tail section.

== Adaptations in other media ==
On 28 April 1952, before a live studio audience, Stewart and Dietrich, along with a full cast, reprised their roles in an adaptation of No Highway in the Sky on the CBS Lux Radio Theatre. (Note: The radio broadcast featured Evelynne Eaton in the role of Miss Corder, the air steward, played in the film by Glynis Johns.)

A BBC Radio 4 Classic Serial was dramatised by Brian Gear in three episodes, broadcast weekly from 11 May 1986, starring John Clegg as Theodore Honey, Norman Bowler as Scott, and Margaret Robertson as Monica Teasdale.

No Highway, a BBC radio adaptation dramatised by Mike Walker with Paul Ritter as Honey, William Beck as Scott, and Fenella Woolgar as Teasdale was directed by Toby Swift for BBC Radio 4's Classic Serial in August 2010.

The central element of No Highway in the Sky (a concerned airline passenger having unique knowledge of an imminent danger, taking drastic action to eliminate it and being regarded as crazy) is comparable to that of The Twilight Zone episode "Nightmare at 20,000 Feet", starring William Shatner, although that involves damage caused by gremlin creature tearing at the wing. A similar additional scene in the 1983 Twilight Zone anthology feature film is that of the character played by John Lithgow, who like that of James Stewart, is portrayed as an engineering expert.

== See also ==
- Cone of Silence
