= Most Secret =

Novel by Nevil Shute

First edition (publ. Heinemann)

Most Secret is a novel by English writer Nevil Shute, written in 1942 but censored until 1945, when it was published by Heinemann. It is narrated by a commander in the Royal Navy, and tells the story of four officers who launch a daring mission at the time when Britain stood alone against Germany after the fall of France. Genevieve is a converted French fishing vessel, crewed by four British officers and a small complement of Free French ex-fishers, armed only with a flame thrower and small arms. Their task is as much psychological as military: to show the Germans that they will one day be beaten back.

== Plot ==
The story is told from the perspective of a senior naval commander who has oversight of a secret wartime operation in which a Breton fishing vessel, the Genevieve, is the means of a series of raids on the German-occupied French coast, focused on the fishing port of Douarnenez, an area where resistance to the German occupation has remained strong. Charles Simon, half English and half French seizes the opportunity to be captured and taken to Britain during a raid on the port while he is visiting. He is recruited as a spy and returns to France, where he uses his professional standing to gain valuable information about new U-boat shelters being built at Lorient and then to return to Britain as an officer in the Royal Engineers. Genevieve had been used by Breton fishers to escape to Britain at the start of the war and is discovered at Dittisham on the River Dart by Michael Rhodes and Oliver Boden, both junior naval officers based at Dartmouth, Devon. Rhodes and Boden discover a shared ambition to use her in some irregular operation against Germany but it is not until a chance meeting with Charles Simon who understands the situation in France that they conceive the plan to arm her with a flame-thrower and mix by night with the fishing fleet which operates from the occupied port of Douarnenez under close German supervision. There are some complexities arising from this proposal for a naval operation being put forward by Simon, an army officer. After gaining approval from the authorities for this plan, they are joined as navigator by John Colvin and a crew of various nationalities, mostly Free French sailors.

In Genevieve's first voyage, they join the Douarnenez fishing fleet under cover of darkness and use the flame thrower to destroy a German Raumboot, one of the armed patrol vessels which accompany the fishing fleet. On a second expedition, Simon is landed on the French coast to undertake a reconnaissance trip to Douarnenez and he discovers the whole fishing fleet and patrol boats to be in port. He befriends an elderly fisherman, Bozallac, and assures him that the British were behind the loss of the first Raumboot and that the local population can be assured that Charles Simon will again attack the Germans with fire. That night they take the Genevieve right into the harbour at Douarnenez and set fire to both Raumboots and the harbour guns, although there are losses among Genevieve's crew and the vessel has to undergo repairs. On her third and final trip, codenamed 'Operation Blanket', the plan is to meet up with the fishing fleet under cover of darkness and transfer small arms which can be distributed among the local population. A diversion is created by a planned Motor gunboat raid, which causes lights to be extinguished and the fishing fleet to scatter. Although the guns are successfully transferred, Genevieve is attacked and sunk by a German destroyer. Boden is killed in the attack. Colvin swims to shore and manages to steal a rowing boat and escape to England. Simon and Rhodes are rescued by the French fishing vessels and hide in Douarnenez, Rhodes having been seriously injured. The Germans seize hostages and announce that they will be killed if the hidden British officers are not given up. With the aid of the parish priest, doctor and Simon and the locals contrive an escape for Rhodes in a fishing boat and Simon gives himself up, securing the release of the hostages. Simon is executed by the Germans. At various key stages in the story, intelligence information from France is received on flimsies marked 'MOST SECRET', reflecting the title of the novel.

== Characters ==
The central character is Charles Simon. His English father dies when he is very young, and he is brought up in France by his French mother until she sends him to an English boarding school. He returns to work in France as an engineer of some standing in the emerging reinforced concrete industry, continuing when the works are taken over and pressed into the services of the occupying German forces who have a great demand for reinforced concrete structures.

Oliver Boden is a naval officer serving in coastal defence trawlers. The son of a wealthy Yorkshire industrialist, his young wife – also his friend since childhood – has been killed early in the war when on a trip to London preparing for the birth of their first child. She dies in a fire following an air-raid, introducing a particular bitterness in Boden and a desire to use fire to fight the Germans.

Michael Rhodes is a special officer who is classed as unfit to serve at sea due to his colour-blindness. A shy and lonely young man, in peacetime he had been an industrial chemist and feels particularly bitter about the war, having been forced to have his dog put down when he joined up for naval officer training. He keeps a rabbit in the net defence store at Dartmouth which is also killed in a German air-raid. As the story unfolds, he falls in love with Wren Barbara Wright, who drives a navy van for the crew of Genevieve.

John Colvin is aged 48, much older than the other men and an experienced sailor. He has a complex past and has worked around the world in various ships, often involved in smuggling illegal liquor. He has also married on several occasions but repeatedly run away to sea. His most recent marriage has been to Junie, while he worked in San Francisco in the lead-up to the war. He left her to work a passage to England in order to fight.

Barbara Wright is a young Wren driver who is based at Dartmouth and is allocated to support the crew of Genevieve, who for reasons of secrecy are based at Dittisham, out of the town of Dartmouth. She has had a sheltered upbringing with elderly aunts in Norwich and has no experience of men but gradually falls in love with Michael Rhodes, initially driving him to Honiton where he first sees a flame-thrower in action and gets the idea for having one fitted to Genevieve.

== Themes ==
The novel is one of several by Shute that are set in the Second World War and deal with aspects such as the German occupation of France and undercover military operations. It is also one many of Shute's where the story is narrated by a person who is not one of the central characters. The theme of fire, and a reputed German fear of fire, is central to the plot of Most Secret.

There are several common elements with Shute's novel Pied Piper, also written in 1942, in which an elderly Englishman escapes from France to England with several children following the outbreak of the war. In particular, the brutality of the German occupying forces in France and elements of the suppression of the population of Douarnenez are strongly reminiscent of elements of the previous novel, as are escape from France by fishing boat, the taking of hostages and execution of prisoners. These ideas reflect Shute's own service in the Royal Naval Volunteer Reserve leading on to his role in the Directorate of Miscellaneous Weapons Development. Most Secret's references to sailing and the English Channel are also reminiscent of the Corbett's trip to France in What Happened to the Corbetts, written in 1938 but taking a wartime theme.
