= Marazan =

1926 novel by Nevil Shute

- First edition
- Author: Nevil Shute
- Language: English
- Genre: Thriller novel
- Publisher: Cassell
- Publication date: 1926
- Publication place: England
- Media type: Print (Hardback & Paperback)

Marazan is the first published novel by the British author Nevil Shute. It was originally published in 1926 by Cassell & Co, then republished in 1951 by William Heinemann. The events of the novel occur, in part, around the Isles of Scilly.

== Plot summary ==
Philip Stenning is a commercial pilot, trained during the First World War. After his engine fails, he crashes and is rescued by an escaped convict, Denis Compton, who turns out to have been framed for embezzlement by his Italian half-brother, Baron Rodrigo Mattani, who is smuggling drugs into England.

The story tells how Stenning plays a key role in breaking that drug ring. It involves episodes characteristic of Shute: flying, small boat sailing, and a love story.

Stenning was a major character in Shute's first (unpublished at the time ) novel Stephen Morris. Stenning also crops up as a comparatively minor character in Shute's next two novels So Disdained (1928) and Lonely Road (1932).

== Author's later reflections ==
In his autobiography Slide Rule, Shute recalls writing the book twice over and rewriting large portions a third time. He wrote as a relaxation from his regular work of designing air ships.

His first two unpublished novels (Stephen Morris and Pilotage) were typed on an old Blick portable typewriter: he said it may not be quite a coincidence that my first published novel Marazan was the first that I wrote on a brand new typewriter bought out of my earnings as an engineer.

== See also ==
- Isles of Scilly
