= Marcus Clarke (disambiguation) =

Marcus Clarke was an Australian novelist best known for writing For the Term of His Natural Life.

Marcus Clarke may also refer to:

- Marcus Clarke (doctor) (1912–2000), Australian doctor in Borneo, interned by the Japanese during World War II, who wrote about his experiences
- Marcus Clarke (puppeteer) (born 1967), British actor, puppeteer and writer

== See also ==
- Marcus Clark & Co., an Australian department store
- Marcus R. Clark (born 1956), Republican member of the Louisiana Supreme Court
