= Round the Bend (novel) =

1951 novel by Nevil Shute

- First edition. Cover artist Val Biro
- Author: Nevil Shute
- Language: English
- Genre: Novel
- Publisher: Heinemann
- Publication date: 1951
- Media type: Print
- Pages: 359 pp.

Round the Bend is a 1951 novel by Nevil Shute. It tells the story of Constantine "Connie" Shaklin, an aircraft engineer who founds a new religion transcending existing religions based on the merit of good work. It deals with racism, including the White Australia policy, and also with the importance of private enterprise. It was one of the first novels Shute wrote after emigrating from Britain to Australia in 1950.

== Plot summary ==
The novel, written in the first person, adopts the voice and eyes of Tom Cutter, an aircraft pilot, engineer, and entrepreneur.

The novel starts with Cutter's boyhood—he gets a job with the Alan Cobham "National Aviation Day" flying circus, of barnstorming aircraft which take customers up for short joyrides, with other entertainment provided. Cutter meets Connie Shaklin, a boy a little older than himself, half Chinese and half Russian but a British subject, and who even then has a deep interest in religion, taking days off to visit houses of worship. When the air circus folds, the two drift apart.

Cutter apprentices in aviation engineering, and also learns to fly. He marries a co-worker named Beryl, and soon afterwards is posted overseas as a civilian to do military-related aviation work during World War II. While overseas, he learns his wife has been unfaithful. He is stern, but forgiving, in letters to her, but when she learns that he is soon to return, she commits suicide. Cutter blames himself. He cannot stand to return to his old job or remain in England, so he buys and rebuilds a small aircraft and flies it to Bahrain, then a British protectorate, to start a freight business.

His service fills a need in the Persian Gulf, and he gradually expands, acquiring more aircraft but never incorporating his business. He keeps his business costs down by hiring no European staff, only what he calls Asiatics. Hired to take a load to Indonesia, he is surprised to find Shaklin there, working for a gunrunner who has been arrested by the Dutch, then in control of much of the country. Shaklin has maintained his interest in spirituality, but is also a very experienced engineer. Cutter is able to hire him and to purchase the gunrunner's plane. Both prove major assets to his business. As Cutter retrieves the plane from a small village in Cambodia, he notes that Shaklin has become a religious leader of sorts there.

Shaklin proves a major influence both on Cutter's staff, impressing on them the need for good and honest work, and on the local Arab community in Bahrain. Putting his teachings in terms of Islam and the Koran, he soon gains influence over the local sheikh, who offers Cutter a substantial interest-free loan for a large aircraft he needs. He accepts, and when he returns from Britain with the aircraft, finds that the authorities are very much upset about the transaction, decrying Shaklin's influence over the sheikh. Cutter does his best to soothe matters, but the British order Shaklin out of the area.

In the interim, Connie's sister, Nadezna, has arrived from California to become Cutter's secretary. She and Cutter rapidly find themselves attracted to each other.

Since one of Cutter's customers needs repeated trips to Australia, and since his Asian staff are not welcome in White Australia, Cutter sets up a forward base in the idyllic island of Bali, and assigns Shaklin to head the operations there, more as a sinecure than anything. One of the local girls is soon in unrequited love with him, while Shaklin busies himself learning about the local religion.

Back in the Persian Gulf, Shaklin's expulsion has indirectly occasioned a more reasonable attitude on the part of the British. The Arabs now hold Shaklin in almost divine regard. The Sheikh's health has started failing, and he expresses a desire to see Shaklin before he dies. He and his entourage travel to Bali to visit Shaklin. This pilgrimage both inspires others to similar travel — and stirs up the Dutch colonial administrators, who expel Shaklin from Indonesia. The Sheikh's doctor has expressed concerns about Shaklin's health, and he is soon diagnosed with leukemia — at that time a death sentence.

Shaklin expresses the desire to travel about and meet with the aircraft technicians he has influenced, for by this time his fame has spread throughout Asia. He does so until he becomes too weak to continue, and then he is taken back to the Cambodian village where his teaching started, and where he dies. Given his following, and the fact that so many believe Shaklin divine, Nadezna feels it would be letting them down to marry and live an ordinary life. She goes back to the convent where she went to school, and works with the children, although she is not a Catholic. Cutter resolves to run his air service as a credit to Connie. Cutter is set by Fahad (the Sheik's son) the task of being one of six people who will write a set of Gospels about Shaklin's life — Cutter's volume of these new Scriptures is the book that has just been read. He still believes Shaklin merely human, but is willing to consider the possibility of him being divine.

== Quotes ==
- "... Right Thinking is indicated in Right Work, and Right Work in Right Thinking, because both are one. ... No man cumbered with error in the Work can reach the state or Right Meditation ..."
- "He took the words to the Buddha in the list of the blessed things, that a man ought to hear and see much in order to acquire knowledge, and of study all science that leads not to sin. He has been saying that in studying the stresses and the forces in the structure of an aircraft, the thermodynamics of an engine or the flow of current in the oscillating circuits of a radio transmitter, we are but following the injunctions of Guatama, who said expressly that we were to learn these things. The world is full of suffering and pain caused by our wrong desires and hatreds and illusions, and only knowledge can remove these causes of our suffering ..."
- "I still think Connie was a human man, a very, very good one--but a man. I have been wrong in my judgments many times before; if now I am ignorant and blind, I'm sorry, but it's no new thing. If that should be the case, though, it means I have had great privileges in my life, perhaps more so than any man alive today. Because it means that on the fields and farms of England, on the airstrips of the desert and the jungle, in the hangars of the Persian Gulf and on the tarmacs of the southern islands, I have walked and talked with God."

== Publication history ==
After the novel's initial publication by Heinemann in 1951 it was reprinted as follows:

- 1951 The Book Society, UK
- 1951 William Morrow, USA
- 1951 Dell Books, USA
- 1951 Ballantine Books, USA
- 1953 Companion Book Club, UK
- 1968 Pan Books, UK
- 1968 Heron Books, UK
- 1970 Greenwood Press, USA
- 1978 Queens House, USA
- 1985 Charnwood, USA
- 1990 Mandarin, UK
- 1991 Mandarin, Australia
- 2000 House of Stratus, USA
- 2003 Redwood Editions, Australia
- 1951 Ballantine Books, USA
- 2010 Vintage Books, USA
- 2011 Vintage Books, UK

In addition the novel was translated into Danish in 1951.

== Reviews ==
Reviewing the novel for the Launceston Examiner Margaret Lane found that the author's love of aeroplanes overpowers the book with so much packed into the history of his main character "that to the non-lover of aircraft the novel sometimes seems like one of those interminable hypnotic life stories one occasionally hears from a stranger in a train."
