= Stephen Morris (novel) =

Novel by Nevil Shute

First UK edition (publ. Heinemann)

Stephen Morris and Pilotage are two short novels by Nevil Shute; the first novels he wrote after writing poetry and short stories. Stephen Morris was finished in 1923 while Shute was working at Stag Lane for de Havilland, and Pilotage was written in 1924. Unpublished during his lifetime, but published by his estate in one volume as many of the characters are common to both novels. They are set in the budding (but nascent) post-war aviation industry in Britain, and also on yachts (Pilotage).

== Stephen Morris ==
Stephen Morris reads mathematics at Oxford but when he finishes, the unusually good job in rubber in Malaya he expected has fallen through because business is bad and the firm cannot afford him. He sees no prospect of marrying now or in the future and sets fellow student Helen Riley free of any promise to him instead of carrying through with his letter proposing marriage. He gets a low paid job as a pilot cum mechanic in the Isle of Wight Aviation Company with her cousin Malcolm Riley and his partner Stenning. The firm fails after the wartime ministry hangar they are occupying is taken back, and he goes (initially on trial, unpaid) to Captain Rawdon's Rawdon Aircraft Co. He becomes head, for a while the only staff, of the technical department; he studies aeronautical engineering and publishes a paper on fuselages. He turns down an offer from an armament firm Pilling-Henries and gets a new screw or rise when Rawdon gets an order for their new two-seater fighter – from Denmark, not from the Air Ministry: we must hope the government won’t risk a war with Denmark.

Morris tells Riley about breaking his engagement to Helen, saying he thinks that she will wait for him. But she is shortly to marry Lechlane, who is going into politics and needs a hostess wife. Riley funks telling Helen in person, but drafts a letter to her. He is then killed when a plane he is piloting for Rawdon makes a forced landing. Christie, back from the Argentine, tells Morris about Helen's engagement, having seen a newspaper item about it. Morris gives up hope of Helen, but while motoring near the Riley's place in Bevil Crossways in Gloucestershire is seen by her. She tells him that she broke off the engagement after Lechlane, who was sent to sort out Riley's affairs finds the draft letter and sends it to her: a most reliable man, Lechlane; a man who could be trusted to always do the right thing.

== Pilotage ==
Peter Denniston proposes to Sheila Wallace; he knew her four years ago, and has a job in Hong Kong with his uncle, as a maritime solicitor. He drops in on the Wallaces while supposedly on a walking tour, but as Jimmie Wallace says: Whoever heard of a man taking a dinner-jacket with him on a walking tour?. She turns him down, saying she could not live in China. So Denniston returns to London for a week solo on the yacht Irene that he shares with Lanard.

In the Solent he collides with Sir David Fisher's large yacht the Clematis which fails to give way to him. Fisher, who as skipper was steering her realises that he was in the wrong. So Fisher takes him on board the Clematis to recover, and gets the Irene repaired. Rawdon and Morris are also on board, discussing a secret aeronautical venture. Morris is married to Helen, though most of their family think that she has married badly. He is described as lean or cadaverous, and says to Denniston that he also knows the Wallaces of Little Tinney, Berkshire.

The secret venture is a proposed transatlantic urgent cargo service; a ship carries a flying boat carrying 500 pounds of urgent cargo which is catapulted off when within range (950 to 1000 miles) of the destination so reducing the transit time from 7 days to 5. The trial flight from New York to Padstow, Cornwall with Morris as pilot and Dennison as navigator is awaited by Rawdon and Wallace, with Helen who is accompanied by Sheila. As it is overdue and will have used all the petrol they fear the worst, but the plane which has taken off 963 miles away but strikes a headwind has landed in Ireland. They refuel with the extra petrol which Morris has taken at the last minute as he had the wind up instead of a dummy load of 500 lbs of firebars. So the scheme appears commercial but is to go to Milford Haven not Padstow.

Sheila tells her brother has refused to go with Dennison to Hong Kong as she knows he will not like it there, not just because she won't like it. But Dennison regards her acceptance as a test – so she was a damn sight too clever, and Antony says he won't come back as she hopes; he urges her to write to Dennison which she does; a very long letter. She tells her brother that she had to have a shot at piloting him out (of Hong Kong; a reference to the book title?). At the end she says that she wrote to him before she heard of the test flight saying she had changed her mind, and he tells her the Hong Kong scheme is off. He has a good job with Fisher, sailing his yacht Chrysanthe at Cowes in season and working in the Fisher Line legal department for an old chap ... And it’s the work I’m keen on. Rawdon and Morris watch them sitting in the sandhills: Rawdon says They don’t want any breakfast.

== Publishing history ==
The introduction says that the two complete novels were left in his papers when he died in 1960. The publisher and family (Heather Felicity Norway) decided to publish them as: They are good stories in themselves, and published in one volume because of the continuity of some of the characters – particularly Stephen Morris – through both. Not only do they provide evidence of Shute's fine narrative gift, but they each contain strong personal elements which readers will find an interesting supplement to the author's autobiography, Slide Rule.

Shute himself wrote about them that: I finished my first novel in 1923, sent it to three publishers, and put it on the shelf, where it will remain because it is a very poor book. I read it the other day after brushing off the dust of nearly thirty years, or rather skimmed it through; I don't thing anyone would have the patience to read the whole thing. I doubt very much, if any, of it was written twice; the evidence of the type was against that, and the timing. I wrote another one in 1924 which was equally bad, and again I was content to put it on the shelf and do something else. They were typed on an old Blick portable: he said it may not be quite a coincidence that his first published novel Marazan was written on a brand new typewriter.

Both novels are short: 140 pages (Stephen Morris) and 129 pages (Pilotage). There are some discrepancies which may have been removed if proofread:

Stenning switched off the engine before he lands (!), and the book then says after he lands that he switched off the engine.
Morris says that he was unpublished so his name would not be known, but earlier it is stated that a paper on fuselages by him has been published.

== Similarities with the author ==
Stephen Morris himself like Shute starts in the budding British aviation industry after studying at Oxford, though unlike Shute he was a wartime fighter pilot. Riley tells Rawdon that Morris first flew in Rawdon fighters: "Rats and Robins .. then he crashed and became a ferry pilot, and after that he went to the Handley Pages .. he's flown pretty well everything ... He'll be a useful man on the design side ..."

Shute's Great War experience was restricted to training at Woolwich and as a gunner and failing to get a commission, before enlisting "in the ranks" in August 1918 and guarding the Isle of Grain in the Thames Estuary, plus serving in military funeral parties in Kent during the 1918 flu pandemic. Peter Dennison is also an Oxford graduate, and as Morris says the right sort. Morris and Dennison are both well-educated, but though helped by family connections to get employment do not inherit money.

A subplot is marriage and the girl who may not wait until her fiancé can support a family, or may not accompany him to a colonial job. Stephen Morris breaks off with Helen Fisher after he loses a proposed job with prospects with an uncle (an old rubber merchant) in Malaya. Peter Dennison is turned down by Sheila Wallace when he takes a job in Hong Kong (as a junior partner with his uncle's firm). Both couples finally reconcile at the end of each book.

== Characters ==
- Stephen Morris, a pilot, was pilot (rank not given) in the war with Malcolm Riley
- Helen Riley girlfriend of Stephen, was at Oxford with him but is several years younger and hardly more than a girl.
- Captain Charles G. H. Rawdon of Rawdon Aircraft Co (1919) Ltd, had manufactured aeroplanes before and during the war

in Stephen Morris: the two partners in the Isle of Wight Aviation Company are:

- Stenning, a pilot, was Captain in war, a “plain little man” (Phillip Stenning is a pilot in Marazan)
- Malcolm Riley a pilot, was Captain in war; plus
- Sir James Riley, 81, a Conservative politician, father of Helen and Malcolm
- Benjamin Riley, invalid brother of Malcolm
- Roger Lechlane, a lawyer and politician, a cousin of Sir James, at Oxford. From a leading Liberal political family but becomes a Conservative or Diehard
- Peters, the mechanic of the Isle of Wight Aviation Company
- Robert Christie, at Oxford, as was his wife, a home student. He returns from the Argentine.

in Pilotage

- Peter Dennison, a solicitor and yachtsman, was at Oxford
- Sheila Wallace, girlfriend of Dennison
- Jimmie Wallace, brother of Sheila (at Oxford, mentioned at the beginning of Stephen Morris) Their father, the old man, is unnamed
- Sir David Fisher, a shipping magnate (Fisher Line) and yachtsman
- Antony, son of the local rector to the Wallaces, was at Oxford, not a suitable match for Sheila (but Sheila's only company in Little Tinney, as her father does not count), prone to disease
- Lanard, shares rooms in London and the yacht Irene on the Solent with Dennison
