= The Seafarers (novel) =

2002 novella by Nevil Shute

- Cover of the first publication (2002)
- Author: Nevil Shute
- Cover artist: Brooke Steiger
- Language: English
- Publisher: The Paper Tiger, Inc. (Creskill, New Jersey)
- Publication date: 2002
- ISBN: 1-889439-32-0
- Website: www.papertig.com/shute.htm

The Seafarers is a novella by Nevil Shute, written in the late 1940s but unpublished until 2002.

== Background ==
Shute wrote the first draft of The Seafarers in 1946–47, and rewrote it shortly afterwards, but he apparently put it aside. In 1948 he rewrote it again as Blind Understanding (unpublished), but left that manuscript incomplete. Some of the themes in The Seafarers and Blind Understanding emerged later in Requiem for a Wren, published in 1955.

== Plot ==
At the end of World War II, at Portland Harbour, Lieutenant Donald Wolfe is supervising the decommissioning of the motor torpedo boat which he commanded with distinction during the war. The dockyard workers are brought to his vessel in a boat driven by Leading Wren Jean Porter. Each is impressed by the other's practical, no-nonsense approach to their work and they become friends. They part when Donald leaves Portland to lay up his disarmed MTB. After both are demobilised they meet again and Donald discovers that the girl he knew as a boatwoman comes from a well-off family whose social environment is very different from his own. He realises that although they both wish to marry each other, the marriage could not work. They go their separate ways, he to work in an insurance office and she (for something to do, rather than for the money) to learn to be a shorthand typist.

But both are dissatisfied with their lives on land and each separately returns to the sea, he to deliver a yacht to England across the Atlantic from Newfoundland and she to deliver a yacht to England from Guernsey. Eventually they meet again on the Hamble and set up a partnership – Wolfe and Porter – to work on boats. They realise that they can now marry, despite her wealthy background, because they earn enough to "keep her in the style she's accustomed to. ... Gumboots and dirty clothes, and Primus stoves, and rough food, and salt water. Not the Savoy Hotel."
