= In the Wet =

1953 novel by Nevil Shute

- First Australian edition (Heinemann)
- Author: Nevil Shute
- Language: English
- Genre: Science Fiction novel
- Publisher: Heinemann
- Publication date: 1953
- Publication place: Australia
- Media type: Print
- Pages: 351 pp.

In the Wet is a novel by Nevil Shute that was first published in the United Kingdom in 1953. It contains many of the typical elements of a hearty and adventurous Shute yarn such as flying, the future, mystic states, and ordinary people doing extraordinary things.

== Plot summary ==
The story is opened by its initial narrator – an Anglican priest in the Bush Brotherhood named Roger Hargreaves – who describes his ordinary circumstances in a large parish of the Queensland outback in 1953. As part of his duties, he has to minister to the dying and this brings him into contact with an aged, alcoholic, opium-smoking, diseased, ex-pilot and ex-ringer named Stevie.

Caught in Stevie's squalid cabin in a heavy rainy season, Hargreaves struggles with recurring malaria whilst on deathwatch for Stevie. As both men are in altered mental states the story shifts and Stevie becomes David 'Nigger' Anderson, a decorated member of the Royal Australian Air Force, telling his story to Hargreaves. But this is a story set 30 years in the future, in 1983.

David Anderson is a quadroon, of mixed European and Aboriginal ancestry. As a first rate pilot he is chosen by his country to be a member of an elite test pilot team in the UK. Although of humble origins, Anderson has advanced quickly in the RAAF and is soon offered a position commanding one of two aircraft of the Queen's Flight.

The England of the 1983 in the story is a technically advanced country that has been abused and bled dry by Socialism. Austerity is the watchword, and food is rationed. In this England the Royal Family is revered by the common people but politicians use them as whipping boys for England's economic woes. Politicians attempt indirectly to control the foreign travel of the monarch by curtailing her use of UK government aircraft, and the Canadian and Australian governments each donate a modern jet transport to the Queen's Flight, provide for operating expenses, and furnish crews. Anderson is chosen as the captain of the Australian plane. Canada and Australia are mostly royalist, and Anderson is shocked at one point by the suggestion that Australia could become a republic.

Australia has adopted the "multiple vote"—every adult gets one vote and additional votes can be earned, up to a maximum of seven. The unequal vote weighting ensures mature and wise representation. Anderson himself has three votes in Australian elections, due to his job and education.

At first absorbed by the job, Anderson becomes aware of the politics occurring around him. The prime minister, Iorweth Jones, seems interested in scoring political points. He places a signal gun in the aircraft in case it needs to land in a field, even though it has a radio.

The Royal family is delighted at the gift of the two airplanes. Anderson meets and eventually falls for a junior secretary to the Queen. Rosemary, daughter of an Oxford don, was assigned to help streamline the administrative aspects of the Commonwealth aircraft joining the Queen's Flight. Anderson learns of the difficult political situation the Queen is facing.

As the Queen visits Canada in the Canadian airplane, UK Labour politicians launch an attack on the Royal Family. The Prince of Wales has Anderson fly him to Ottawa to join the Queen. It is later shown that the Prince carries an ultimatum from himself and his sister (the Queen has only those two children)—they will not take the job of monarch as it stands.

Anderson is ordered to fly the Queen and her entourage, including Rosemary, not back to England, but on to Australia to meet with politicians there. En route, a lengthy refueling delay on Christmas Island allows the Queen to relax a bit—until local officials show up with their wives, in formal dress. Anderson, ill with food poisoning, has an odd dream showing Hargreaves and Stevie in the bush cabin in the wet.

After he recovers, the party fly on to Australia. The Queen meets with Australian politicians and with elder statesmen Sir Robert Menzies and Arthur Calwell (who were politicians in real-life 1953). After the meetings Anderson flies the Queen back to England. There ground control diverts the flight hundreds of miles to Yorkshire on the pretext that the Australian airmen are not qualified to land at Heathrow in poor weather. The diversion to Yorkshire is apparently intended to inconvenience the Queen. After Royal intervention, Anderson and his crew are granted accreditation as civil aviators.

Anderson asks Rosemary to marry him, but she refuses so long as the Queen needs her. She arranges for Anderson to meet her father, a political scientist. Her father inadvertently reveals that the Queen is contemplating having a Governor General of Britain who will deal with the politicians, with the monarch devoted to Commonwealth affairs.

The Queen announces this on her Christmas broadcast. She states that she and her family will not return to Britain unless the country undergoes political reforms, meaning adoption of the multiple vote and the installation of a Governor General for the United Kingdom as a buffer between the Monarch and Parliament, whose behaviour has become a constitutional and personal affront to the Queen.

The Queen desires to fly to Australia. David takes every precaution to protect the aircraft, and he takes off with the Queen. Then a sixth sense, deriving from his Aboriginal heritage, gives him a feeling something is wrong. He searches the party's luggage, and finds a sealed suitcase that does not belong to any of the crew or passengers, obviously a bomb. He struggles to throw it overboard, and through skilled flying, he creates the right conditions to make that happen. The Queen awards David the Seventh Vote, given only by Royal commission.

The party reaches Australia. Meanwhile, in Britain, the new Governor General has summoned Parliament to debate the multiple vote. Prime Minister Jones' government falls, and a new Laour government seems willing to adopt the electoral reform. The Queen is no longer in a crisis, so Rosemary says she can leave the royal employment and marry David.

In an epilogue, the framing story resumes. Stevie has died peaceably, and as an exhausted Hargreaves tries to understand the import of his dream, a bush-bound couple presents a newborn to him for christening. The child's name is David Anderson. Seeing that something beyond this world had lifted the veil of time itself to him, Hargreaves tells the couple not to assume that the child's humble birth will limit his future prospects.

== DeHavilland Ceres ==
The fictional DeHavilland Ceres flown by the Queen's Flight appears to be based on the concept of the Avro Atlantic, a civilianised jet airliner version of the Avro Vulcan jet bomber, designed for intercontinental travel. This plane was merely a design concept at the time the novel was written and never did enter production.

== Multiple vote ==
One of the most interesting features of the book is the idea of the "multiple vote", seen as a necessary reform of democracy. This is plural voting under another name. In elections described by Shute, a person could have up to seven votes. Everyone gets a basic vote. Other votes can be earned for education (including a commission in the armed forces), earning one's living overseas for two years, raising two children to the age of 14 without divorcing, being an official of a Christian church, or having a high earned income. The seventh vote, which in the book is awarded to David Anderson for his heroism, is only given at the Queen's discretion by Royal Charter.

Plural voting was used in Britain in the past and still is used today in the City of London. Until the late 1940s, the graduates of all British universities sent representatives to Parliament, and property owners could vote in district where they lived and where they owned property if they were different. A university-educated property owner could have two or more votes, with one person being noted as having 50 separate votes.

== Governor Generalship for the United Kingdom ==
As a component of the Queen's declaration, one of the mandated reforms is the installation of a Governor General for the United Kingdom, in the wake of an increasingly assertive and aggressive Labour government administering the country in the wake of the Third World War. As the Queen is monarch of the Commonwealth, there are real constitutional questions as to whether proportional representation and presence in Commonwealth realms of the Sovereign takes precedence over the comparatively smaller population of United Kingdom in comparison.

During the novel, the growing disaffection for both Monarch and Prime Minister, as well as the threat by the Prince of Wales to refuse the throne if offered it due to the behaviour of the Labour Government requires a means of settlement. The only solution, in the end, is to give rise to a buffer between Crown and Parliament - a Governor General.

Unlike a Monarch, the Governor General has the capacity to give a direct response to the Government, without fear of political rift developing with the Crown, as this post is intermediary. If a Governor-General's political conduct is sufficiently poor, replacement by appointment by the Crown is a realistic procedure, and is outside of the control of Parliament.

In addition, a Governor General can sit within Parliament as the Monarch's representative, and is also permitted as in other Commonwealth realms, to address Parliament, which the Monarch is normally not expected to do other than ceremoniously. The Governor General can, as the Monarch does only in a private audience, the capacity to be consulted, to advise, and to warn - but with the difference that this would be done within the public sphere, in the presence of the entire Parliament, rather than in the confines of the Private Audience between Prime Minister and Sovereign.

This change would then permit the reform of the political process, and expose the behaviour of an antagonistic government and Prime Minister to the entire Parliament, and House of Lords, moderating their conduct through exposure of intent.

== Critical reception ==
A reviewer in The Bulletin noted that it "deserves, and probably will get, the reward of audacity; if half of Mr. Shute’s bravery is a contempt of the dangers of sloppy writing and obvious thinking, the other half is an effort to do something new and different for the Coronation Year".

== Publication history ==
After the novel's initial publication in the UK by Heinemann in 1953 it was reprinted as follows:

- 1953 Heinemann, Australia
- 1953 William Morrow, USA
- 1954 London Book Club, UK
- 1957 Permabooks, USA
- 1969 Pan Books, UK
- 1973 Pan Books, UK
- 1978 Queens House, USA
- 1985 Charnwood, UK
- 1986 Amereon House, USA
- 1988 General Paperbacks, Canada
- 1990 Mandarin, UK
- 2000 House of Stratus, USA
- 2010 Vintage Books, USA

In addition the novel was translated into Swedish, German, Danish in 1954, French in 1955, and Dutch in 1968.

== Notes ==
- Epigraph:
  Lord God of Hosts, through whom alone
  A Prince can rule his nation,
  Who settest Kings upon their throne
  And orderst each man's station;
  Now, and through ages following,
  This grace to us be given:
  To serve and love an earthly King
  Who serves our King in Heaven.- C.A. Alington (from a hymn sung at Shrewsbury School)
