= The Rainbow and the Rose =

1958 novel by Nevil Shute

- First edition cover
- Author: Nevil Shute
- Publisher: Heinemann
- Publication date: 1958
- Pages: 306

The Rainbow and the Rose is a novel by Nevil Shute, first published in England in 1958 by Heinemann.

== Title ==
The title is taken from a sonnet "The Treasure" by Rupert Brooke, which is quoted in full as a preface:

When colour goes home into the eyes,
And lights that shine are shut again
With dancing girls and sweet birds' cries
Behind the gateways of the brain;
And that no-place which gave them birth, shall close
The rainbow and the rose:—

Still may Time hold some golden space
Where I'll unpack that scented store
Of song and flower and sky and face,
And count, and touch, and turn them o'er,
Musing upon them; as a mother, who
Has watched her children all the rich day through,
Sits, quiet-handed, in the fading light,
When children sleep, ere night.

== Plot summary ==
The story concerns the life of Canadian Johnnie Pascoe, a retired commercial and military pilot, who has crashed while attempting a medevac flight in difficult weather conditions into a small airstrip a mountainous region of Tasmania. Unconscious and suffering from a dangerous head injury, he lies in the house of the child he had been sent to help, which is inaccessible by road and in contact with the outside world only by radio. Hearing of his plight, Ronnie Clarke — an airline pilot and student of Pascoe decades earlier — offers to try and land a young doctor. After two failed flights in one of Pascoe's own Taylorcraft Auster aircraft from the small flight school Pascoe set up after retirement, Clarke rests overnight at Pascoe's house, meets Pascoe's two daughters, and narrates the life of his former mentor through three dream episodes.

In the first episode, Pascoe is a young fighter pilot in the Royal Flying Corps during The Great War and marries an up-and-coming actress. At war's end they separate when she accepts a role in Hollywood, moves in with another man, and files for divorce from there with sole custody of their daughter.

A few years later, in the 1920s, Pascoe is chief pilot at the small flying school where Clarke learned to fly, and becomes romantically involved with a student pilot, Brenda Marshall, whose husband is in a mental asylum after sexually assaulting children. Things go awry after the birth of Pascoe's and Marshall's baby daughter, and when Marshall learns that her husband has refused to grant a divorce, she commits suicide by deliberately crashing her de Havilland Moth. Pascoe leaves the country, with the baby in the care of Marshall's mother, and shortly afterwards he learns that the baby has died

In the final dream episode, after having served with Ferry Command during the Second World War beside Clarke, Pascoe is a senior pilot with fictitious AusCan Airlines in the 1950s, flying routes between Canada and Australia, and approaching mandatory retirement at age 60. Peggy Dawson, a flight attendant and former nurse in her late 20s, asks to join his cabin crew and impresses him during the interview. They begin to spend more time together during layovers, and he develops feelings for her that he notes are non-sexual. With retirement approaching, Pascoe wants to find a way to keep Dawson in his life, so he proposes marriage, even though he does not believe that his feelings are romantic. Dawson reveals that she rightfully should be named Brenda Maragaret Pascoe. She is Pascoe's daughter with Brenda Marshall, who Pascoe believed to have died in infancy; she had left nursing and joined AusCan airlines to observe her father and possibly to make contact with him.

The framing story closes with Ronnie Clarke making a successful attempt to land the doctor and Pascoe's daughter Nurse Dawson in clear weather the next morning, only to learn that Pascoe had died during the night. Dawson remains to arrange for an informal burial, then plans to hike 40 miles (64 km) back through to bush with the rescue party to deal with her father's estate. There is a strong suggestion that Dawson and the young doctor have developed feelings for each other.

Clarke returns to Melbourne, 36 hours after he left, and notes that his life is full of blessings with his spouse and children, while Pascoe, who was (in his opinion) the better man, had so little joy in life.

Like Conrad, Shute often uses a narrator to tell the story; in The Rainbow and the Rose, the narrator periodically shifts from Clarke to Pascoe.

== Critical reception ==
Kirkus Reviews noted the novel's limitations; "Not literature, this, but good reading, both as romance and adventure. The flying aspects are perhaps the best part of the book."

Of this novel a reviewer in The Bulletin magazine found that "his enormous audience will doubtless read as a romance without bothering about much more than the swift movement of the story; but at the same time one must express a certain admiration for the way in which he handles–or avoids handling–the Australian parts of it."

== Publication history ==
After the novel's initial publication by Heinemann in 1958 it was reprinted as follows:

- 1958 William Morrow, USA
- 1959 The Book Club, UK
- 1959 New American Library, USA
- 1966 Ballantine Books, USA
- 1969 Heron Books, UK
- 1973 Pan Books, UK
- 1991 Mandarin, Australia
- 2000 House of Stratus, UK
- 2010 Vintage Books, USA

In addition the novel was translated into Danish in 1958.
