= So Disdained =

1928 novel by Nevil Shute

- First edition
- Author: Nevil Shute
- Language: English
- Genre: Thriller novel
- Publisher: Cassell
- Publication date: 1928
- Publication place: United Kingdom
- Media type: Print (Hardback & Paperback)

So Disdained is the second published novel by British author, Nevil Shute (N.S. Norway). It was first published in 1928 by Cassell & Co., reissued in 1951 by William Heinemann, and issued in paperback by Pan Books in 1966. In the United States it was first published in 1928 by Houghton Mifflin in Boston, with the title The Mysterious Aviator.

== Political and diplomatic background ==
When the book was written, Germany was disarmed under the Versailles Treaty, Hitler was still a marginal figure in the politics of the Weimar Republic and, as the book makes clear, the major political and military threat was perceived to be from the Soviet Union, then in the first flush of success of the October Revolution.

The book describes a state of Cold War between Britain and the Soviet Union, though the term did not yet exist. Many elements which later became familiar in the background of 1950s and 1960s thrillers – an accelerated arms race, the development of secret weapons, intensive espionage and counter-espionage around these weapons projects, political and social subversion, and the tendency to promote right-wing dictatorships as allies against Communism – are already present in this book, three decades earlier.

The book was written in the direct aftermath of the 1926 General Strike which seemed to put the spectre of a Socialist Revolution – highly unwelcome to people of Shute's persuasion – on the British agenda.

== Title ==
The text is prefaced by a quotation from Sir Walter Raleigh:

And then none shall be unto them so odious and disdained as the traitours ... who have solde their countrie to a straunger and forsaken their faith and obedience contrarie to nature or religion; and contrarie to that humane and generall honour not onely of Christians but of heathen and irreligious nations, who have always sustained what labour soever and embraced even death itself for their countrie, prince, and commonwealth.

== Plot summary ==
Peter Moran, the narrator, is agent to Lord Arner, administering his (fictional) estate of Under Hall in West Sussex. Driving home after a dinner in Winchester, he chances to encounter Maurice Lenden, who in 1917 had been a fellow pilot in the Royal Flying Corps.

It emerges that Lenden, who had suffered repeated financial failure and believes himself to be divorced, has entered Soviet service as a mercenary pilot, thus becoming a traitor to his own country. On a night espionage flight to photograph naval construction in Portsmouth Harbour, he has made a forced landing in his Breguet XIX in a remote part of the Under Hall estate.

Despite having no Communist sympathies, Moran shelters Lenden, hides the aeroplane, and contrives to mislead a Royal Air Force investigator. However, he takes the precaution of covertly exposing Lenden's photographic plates so that the images cannot be returned to the Soviets.

Shortly afterwards, two Communist agents steal the photographic plates in order to take them back to their base in an Italian villa. Lenden, who has recovered his wife and his patriotism, sets off in pursuit. Moran in turn sets off to intercept Lenden near the Italian border, taking off in the aeroplane as the only way to catch up with him.

Moran's plan fails because he is injured landing in Italy. Instead, he persuades the local Fascists to storm the communist hideout. They are too late; most of the Communists have fled and Lenden has been mortally wounded while stealing the photographic plates. Shortly before dying, he redeems himself by smashing the plates; Moran does not tell him that they were exposed even before he sacrificed his life to retrieve them.

Philip Stenning, the first person narrator of Marazan, appears in the final part of this novel as Moran's ally. Once again he is portrayed as a 'rough diamond' with a debatable sense of moral justice.

== Portrayal of Italian Fascists ==
As in Marazan, one of Shute's characters expresses respect for the Italian Fascist movement of the time. In the seventh chapter Moran, wounded from his crash landing in Italy, considers his options and comes to the conclusion that "I had to get allies. I was up against a Bolshevik organization; the most obvious people in Italy to set against the Bolsheviks were the Fascisti."

In the final chapters of the book, Moran meets Captain Fazzini, the local Fascist leader: "I liked the look of him. He was a man of my own age, very tall and straight, and with a tanned, unshaven face. He had a very high forehead, and in some peculiar way he had the look of a leader in spite of his three-days' beard."

When Fazzini has roused his men to raid the secret Communist base, Moran remarks: "His force of Fascisti paraded in the square. It took some time to get them out to parade – they must have all been in bed – but I liked the look of them. They were a fine, straight body of young men, dressed in field-green breeches and black shirts and each armed with a sort of truncheon."

Though equipped with truncheons, the Fascists depicted in the book are not eager to use them on the single Communist captured in the raid. Rather, they interrogate him only verbally and ineffectively, and it is the Englishman Philip Stenning who brutally beats up the prisoner, breaking his arm, to extract information on the fate of Lenden. The Fascist leader Fazzini actually tries to restrain Stenning. Moran remarks that "I don't think that physical violence to a prisoner was much in Fazzini's line".

By the time the book was republished in 1951, the British public's perception of a Fascist militia leader had considerably changed. Shute's foreword to the 1951 edition, in which he remarks that he changed nothing in the book except "half a dozen outmoded pieces of slang", may indicate that he decided not to make any change in the favourable depiction of the Fascists.

== Author's note, quoted from the 1951 edition ==
This was the second of my books to be published, twenty-three years ago. It took me nearly three years to write, because I was working as an engineer on the construction of an airship and I wrote only in the evenings in the intervals of more important technical work. It was written through from start to finish twice, and some of it three times.

Clearly, I was still obsessed with standard subjects as a source of drama – spying, detection, and murder, so seldom encountered by real people in real life. Perhaps I was beginning to break loose from these constraints: the reader must judge that for himself.

In revising the book for re-issue I have altered half a dozen outmoded pieces of slang, but I have made no other changes. The book achieved publication in the United States under the somewhat uninspiring title The Mysterious Aviator.

— Nevil Shute (1951)

Shute makes similar comments about rewriting So Disdained in his autobiography Slide Rule (page 78).
