= Ruined City =

Novel by Nevil Shute (1938)

- First edition
- Author: Nevil Shute
- Language: English
- Publisher: Cassell
- Publication date: 1938

Ruined City is a 1938 novel by Nevil Shute, published by Cassell in the UK. In the US, the book was published by William Morrow under the title Kindling.

== Plot summary ==
The story is set in the Depression years of the 1930s, when a rich London financier, Henry Warren, suffering from health problems and a broken marriage, decides to disappear from his old life, and travel incognito in the industrial North, now plagued with unemployment.

In the fictional town of Sharples, whose only shipyard has just closed, he is taken ill and admitted to hospital, where he is mistaken for one of the unemployed. After a successful operation, and a burgeoning friendship with Alice, the hospital’s almoner, he takes stock of the local situation, and resolves to use his wealth to help the community. Knowing that the shipyard is for sale at a knockdown price, he buys it secretly, but finds that he can only attract business from a dubious oil-rich Balkan state, in need of tankers. To float the new company, Warren must sign a prospectus, declaring falsely that the yard is well-placed to make a profit. But when the oil-state suffers a revolution, its business is lost, and the only way to save the yard is for Warren to take personal responsibility for the deception, earning him two years’ jail.

On his eventual release, he revisits Sharples, to find that the yard has managed to prosper, thanks to new rearmament projects, and the management has erected a bronze plaque, honouring his part in saving the local jobs. When he is recognised, the whole town rushes to greet him, including Alice who has been loyally awaiting his return.

== Background ==
The book is loosely based on Shute's own experience at Howden in Yorkshire as Calculator of the R100 project and his experience as a director of Airspeed Ltd.

In 1935, Airspeed signed a manufacturing licensing agreement with Fokker and considered making the Fokker D.XVII fighter for Greece, who wanted to buy from Britain for currency reasons. Shute (now managing director) and a Fokker representative "who was well accustomed to methods of business in the Balkans" spent three weeks in Athens but did not close the deal.
