= The Chequer Board =

1947 novel by Nevil Shute

- First edition cover
- Author: Nevil Shute
- Publisher: William Heinemann Ltd
- Publication date: March 26, 1947

The Chequer Board is a novel by English writer Nevil Shute, first published in the United Kingdom in 1947 by William Heinemann Ltd. The novel deals with the question of racism within the US forces during World War II and portrays black characters with sympathy and support. Shute began writing The Chequer Board in September 1945 and completed it in February 1946.

== Plot summary ==
"This novel may shock you, but not for any of the usual reasons. The clear vision of this swift-moving, heart-warming story will give you a glimpse of what the brotherhood of man might mean."

— Dust-jacket, US edition, 1947

The story tells of the experiences of one John (Jackie) Turner, whom the doctors have given just one year to live as a result of a severe head injury sustained when the aircraft in which he was travelling was attacked by a German fighter in the Second World War. Turner decides to use his remaining time to trace the men he got to know while recovering in hospital.

The men were:

- Flying Officer Phillip Morgan: the plane's British pilot.
- Corporal Duggie Brent: a young British Commando, accused of murder.
- Pfc Dave Lesurier: a black American serviceman, accused of attempted rape, in hospital after cutting his own throat while being pursued.

As the story unfolds, the reader learns that charges against Lesurier were dropped after an Army investigation and that he later returned to the English town near which he was stationed during the war. He marries the girl he was courting and becomes a draughtsman. Brent is acquitted of murder but serves six months for manslaughter. He is later found living close to Lesurier and working as a meat vendor. Morgan relocates to Burma and becomes a successful businessman, married into a strong local community.

Turner is contented by the thought that each man, who had helped with his recovery after the plane crash, had succeeded in making a good life in his own way. The novel ends with what will be his last visit to his medical specialist.

Underlying the novel is the Buddhist belief in reincarnation and redemption. Despite his shady past, it is indicated that Turner, through his attempts to help his fellow patients and his acceptance of his death, has moved closer to Nirvana.

== Cultural background ==
The book's title is taken from Stanza XLIX of Edward FitzGerald's Rubáiyát of Khayyám:

'Tis all a Chequer-board of Nights and Days
Where Destiny with Men for Pieces plays:
Hither and thither moves, and mates, and slays,
And one by one back in the Closet lays.

The initial idea for The Chequer Board came about when Shute came across the book A Rising Wind (1945) by the American civil rights campaigner Walter White. Shute contacted White and a correspondence developed.

The portions of the book that take place in Burma were based on Shute's own experiences there during World War II. From the dust-jacket: "It was very difficult to feel these cultured brown girls, all speaking excellent English...were really any different from the girls at home." He also noted during the war the "popularity of American Negroes in England and the superior quality of the Burmese people", both of which are central to the book's story. Shute drew on the outbreak of racial violence in 1943 involving American soldiers stationed in the village of Bamber Bridge, Lancashire, in Northern England.

Shute was concerned that sales of the book in the United States would be reduced because of the book's open-minded handling of racial issues; as it turned out, sales soared. Shute and his wife travelled around the U.S. on Greyhound buses to "get in touch with the man on the street," finding the experience refreshing. Afterwards he wrote "Sincerity is the first attribute for making money in the business of writing novels."

== Reviews ==
- Punch: "As a novelist, Nevil Shute goes from strength to strength, experimenting, drawing out life as he sees it, and setting it before us in ordered pattern...The Chequer Board is a notable novel."
- Daily Express: "A happy knack endows this story with a character who is slightly greater than life-size. It proves once again how the ordinary, the average, the season-ticket holder sitting next to you, can still, in the hands of an expert, furnish the very stuff of literature."
- The New York Times: "Shute's most significant book."
- Houston Post: "In the gripping, breathless tradition of a master craftsman."
- Kirkus Reviews: "In itself, each story has values, but the whole lacks the sense of suspense one looks for in Shute."
