= Lonely Road (film) =

1936 film

- Victoria Hopper and Clive Brook meet in a dance hall
- Directed by: James Flood
- Written by: Gerard Fairlie; Anthony Kimmins; James Flood
- Based on: Lonely Road by Nevil Shute
- Produced by: Basil Dean
- Starring: Clive Brook; Victoria Hopper; Nora Swinburne; Malcolm Keen
- Cinematography: Jan Stallich
- Edited by: Sidney Cole
- Music by: Ernest Irving
- Production company: Associated Talking Pictures
- Distributed by: Associated British Film Distributors; Grand National Pictures (US)
- Release date: 24 August 1936
- Running time: 80 minutes
- Country: United Kingdom
- Language: English

Lonely Road is a 1936 British crime drama film directed by James Flood and starring Clive Brook, Victoria Hopper, Nora Swinburne, and Malcolm Keen. It was shot at Ealing Studios in London. The film was released in the United States as Scotland Yard Commands.

The film was based on the 1932 novel Lonely Road by Nevil Shute, who had visualised the chief character as the actor Clive Brook and had sent a copy of the novel to Brook. Shute visited the studio, and was pleased to see the film made (though the payment for film rights was not large by American standards).

== Plot ==
Commander Malcolm Stevenson proposes to Lady Anne, which surprises her, as she thought they were only friends. She also thinks he is too restless to settle down. While speeding half-drunk in his car, an "Auburn Supercharger," he ends up stuck in sand on a beach, where he stumbles upon some smugglers. Before he is knocked unconscious, one of the men mentions carpet sweepers, of all things. After recuperating from what he thinks was a simple car accident, he decides to drive to Scotland.

In Leeds, he goes to a dance hall. There he rescues singer and taxi dancer Molly Gordon from a young man she obviously dislikes. After their first dance together, he buys enough tickets to dance and chat with her until closing. By chance, he learns that her brother is doing very well driving a lorry delivering carpet sweepers.

Later, he is consulted by a police friend, who shows him a crate labeled carpet sweepers, but containing two weapons similar to Tommy guns. He begins to suspect he was knocked out, and that Molly's brother is involved. He takes his story to Scotland Yard. It agrees with information they already have. They ask him to see Molly again and find out where her brother is. He agrees, to spare Molly police interrogation. However, she has not heard from her brother in a while and does not know how to reach him.

Stevenson invites her to holiday with him at his home in Devonshire. Suspicious at first, she agrees.

Stevenson is coerced into bringing Molly to Scotland Yard for questioning. Not liking how Major Norman is conducting the interrogation, Stevenson insists she will answer no more questions without her solicitor being present.

Stevenson and Molly locate her brother Billy through his ex-girlfriend. He reluctantly tells them all he knows. Palmer is the ringleader of the smugglers. Someone Palmer calls "Professor" wants the planted guns found; he has the idea that the issue of gun-running will get him elected and has hired Palmer to arrange it all. However, Palmer sees Billy with Stephenson and Major Norman. One of his confederates recognises Norman, so Palmer decides to flee the country, after silencing Billy. He shoots Professor in cold blood when the latter refuses to abandon his scheme and avoid the attendant unwanted publicity. Palmer shoots Billy, and Molly when she runs to her brother's aid, at Stevenson's place. Stevenson chases the crooks down and captures all three. The doctor tells Stevenson that if he can persuade Molly (to whom he has proposed) to sleep, she will pull through. Stevenson succeeds.

== Cast ==
- Clive Brook as Malcolm Stevenson
- Victoria Hopper as Molly Gordon
- Nora Swinburne as Lady Anne
- Malcolm Keen as Professor
- Cecil Ramage as Major Norman
- Charles Farrell as Palmer
- Laurence Hanray as Jenkinson
- Frederick Peisley as Bill Gordon
- Ethel Coleridge as Mrs. Rogers
- Warburton Gamble as Fedden
- Dennis Wyndham as The Satellite
- Frederick Leister as Doctor McKenzie
- Arthur Hambling as Police Constable
- Dorothy Boyd as Palais Hostess

== Bibliography ==
- Low, Rachael. Filmmaking in 1930s Britain. George Allen & Unwin, 1985.
- Wood, Linda. British Films, 1927–1939. British Film Institute, 1986.
