= No Highway =

1948 novel by Nevil Shute

- First edition
- Author: Nevil Shute
- Language: English
- Genre: Suspense; Mystery
- Publisher: William Heinemann
- Publication date: 1948
- Publication place: United Kingdom
- Media type: Print (hardcover & paperback)
- Pages: 268 pages
- ISBN: 978-0-09953-009-1

No Highway is a 1948 novel by Nevil Shute. It formed the basis of the 1951 film No Highway in the Sky.

A scientist has been claiming that certain parts of a new aircraft called a Reindeer will develop metal fatigue sooner than officially estimated, but nobody takes him seriously. While flying to the site of an air crash that killed a Soviet ambassador, he discovers that his own plane is a Reindeer which has already flown twice its permitted number of hours. He uses his technical knowledge to sabotage it as soon as it lands, putting his credibility further in doubt.

The plot weaves together many themes, such as attitudes to safety, conflicts of interest between management and professionals, Cold War diplomacy, single parenthood and clairvoyance, before the scientist's theory is finally vindicated. As the novel appears to presage some later real-life disasters and is based on just-emerging knowledge of metal fatigue, it is said to be one of few novels to reveal a new engineering truth.

Shute was a pioneer aircraft designer and co-founder of the aircraft construction company Airspeed Ltd.

== Characters ==
- Theodore Honey: A middle-aged widower and experienced scientist at the Royal Aircraft Establishment Farnborough, Hampshire (RAE), working on safety;
- Dr Dennis Scott: Younger, dynamic aeronauticist and recently appointed head of the structural department at the RAE, brought in to 'downsize' the department;
- Marjorie Corder: Airline stewardess, in her mid-20s and tiring of the "glamorous life" with the fictional C.A.T.O.;
- Monica Teasdale, an older, middle-echelon Hollywood actress, facing a lonely retirement;
- Captain Samuelson: veteran pilot of the Reindeer, highly respected;
- Elspeth: Honey's twelve-year-old daughter;
- Shirley Scott: Dr Scott's wife, a local schoolteacher.

== Plot ==
The narrator is Dr Scott, brought in to downsize his department, and the plot concerns his consideration of Theodore Honey, who initially comes across as an unlikely hero. Mr Honey, a widower, does not live a conventional British life, and is bringing up his young daughter, Elspeth, alone. He is engaged in research on the fatigue of aluminium airframes. He is currently investigating possible failure in the high aspect ratio tailplane of a new airliner, the fictional "Rutland Reindeer".

Honey is nervous and distrusting of the 'new broom', and is unimpressive in appearance and is so intensely focused on his work that his relations with the outside world – which were never that good to begin with – suffer badly. Throughout the story, people judge him by that appearance, or by his varied and unconventional outside interests, such as pyramidology, the study of possible esoteric interpretations of the Pyramids.

Honey has predicted, by a (fictional) theory supposedly related to quantum mechanics, that it is possible for an aluminium alloy structure to fail long before the design lifetime predicted by the usual design standards. He is using a spare tailplane from a Reindeer aircraft in a fatigue test. Honey's theory predicts that the metal at the root of the tailplane will suffer from metal fatigue and fail with a crystalline fracture.

Before Dr Scott's arrival, despite Honey's concerns, the aircraft had recently been allowed into service. Honey's work is regarded as likely to refute his far-fetched theory, rather than raising a significant safety issue. But the newly arrived Mr Scott links it with the recent crash of a Reindeer carrying the Soviet ambassador, which had total flying hours close to Honey's estimate, and which crashed in northeastern Quebec. The crash report, including photographs, is inconclusive, and Scott feels that the remains of the aircraft must be physically examined.

Honey is sent to Canada to examine the debris of the crash, travelling on board a Reindeer aircraft on which he meets the two heroines of the novel, Corder and Teasdale. During the flight, Honey discovers from the cockpit crew that the flying hours of this aircraft are twice those of any other Reindeer in service, and are close to his predicted failure time. He becomes increasingly anxious for its safety. He confides in Teasdale, whose films he admires, and goes on to give her some advice on the safest place to go in the aircraft in the event of a crash. Despite his alarm, he remains persuasive and sincere, and impresses Corder and Teasdale. He also impresses the pilot, Samuelson, who knew the captain of the recently crashed Reindeer and had rejected with scorn the official inquiry's conclusion that the crash was the result of pilot error.

During a heated discussion during a stopover at Gander International Airport, Honey realises that he has failed to persuade anyone to declare the Reindeer unfit for service, and in desperation, he disables it by raising its undercarriage while it is standing on the tarmac, leaving the aircraft damaged and unable to move.

Honey is recalled to Farnborough after this sabotage, but he is delayed because C.A.T.O., the fictional operator of the damaged aircraft, refuses to carry him. While he is away, trouble arises on a second front. For the duration of his trip, he has left Elspeth in their shabby, neglected home in Farnham, with only the supervision of the unreliable cleaning woman.

Shirley Scott finds Elspeth unconscious, confirming her misgivings about the state of Honey's home life, and nurses her. Elspeth displays a touching mix of precocity and serious intelligence, but betrays Honey's hobbies of spiritualism and prophecy. That notwithstanding, Elspeth's outlook is tempered with serious thought and childhood happiness in simple things.

Teasdale visits Dr Scott at Farnborough and relates her story of events to the Director of the RAE before offering Elspeth some feminine care and affection. Her affection for Honey is obvious, but she realises it is not to be – she cannot give him children or sustain him in his work. She is rapidly followed by Corder, who bears Honey's letter of resignation to Scott and her own account of the events in Gander.

By the time Honey returns, Scott has left for Canada to retrieve the tailplane roots. On reaching the crash site he discovers that the parts of the aircraft adjacent to where the tailplane separated have been removed by the Soviet party who came to recover the body of their Ambassador. The Soviet authorities suspect that the crash was part of a plot to assassinate the ambassador, and are wholly unhelpful when approached for information about the missing tailplane root.

The tailplane itself remains lost in the wilderness, but must be found if there is any hope of proving the existence of metal fatigue. Honey comes to the rescue, but in a highly unorthodox way. He puts his daughter into a light trance which, to Corder's shock, Elspeth has clearly experienced before.

Using a planchette and automatic writing, a message is written: UNDER THE FOOT OF THE BEAR. Sceptical of the message's value, the Director refuses to send it to Scott, and a heated exchange follows. The Director points out that "the bear" could just as plausibly refer merely to the Soviet Union and that the message tells them no more than they already know. With Corder's and Samuelson's help and their C.A.T.O. contacts, Honey manages to have the message passed to Scott in the Canadian woods. Scott and his party work out that "the bear" could refer to a lake, Dancing Bear Water, 30 or 40 miles back along the flight path of the lost aircraft, and there, in due course, they find the tailplane.

Its front spar root reveals a classic fatigue fracture. The find vindicates Honey's theory and makes him a minor hero in aviation circles – to which he is indifferent. His early warning even allows for a timely redesign by the manufacturers, ensuring no loss of service of the Reindeers over the Atlantic and allowing the safety issue to be hushed-up. But Dr Scott goes on to take safety more seriously than had been previous practice. Corder and Honey finally marry one another.

== Aircraft types ==
Rutland Reindeer: Built by the Rutland Aircraft Company, in service with C.A.T.O, then regularly plying the Atlantic. Powered by eight engines with four contra-rotating propellers (four nacelles carrying two engines each), the Reindeer can best be imagined to resemble the Bristol Brabazon, whose future development would also have included jet power, and Shute notes this late in the novel. It is described as a low-wing monoplane with a nosewheel-type undercarriage and a single tail. In the movie, the tail is 'wasp waisted' to emphasize its weakness visually.

Assegai Mk.1 powered by a Boreus afterburning turbojet. At the end of the novel this aircraft is under investigation by Dr Scott because three of them have been lost through transonic disintegration. This parallels the late development of the Gloster Meteor, whose later versions featured powerful engines providing more thrust than the airframe was designed to accommodate. They also suffered from transonic buffeting in powered dives; two were lost to tail separation. The problem in the latter cases was that the aircraft had not been designed using the transonic area rule, its aerodynamics being unsuited to stable flight in the transonic envelope, causing problems such as structural flutter (felt by the pilot as buffeting) and control reversals – both of which would have been most likely to be present in a high-speed dive.

Avro Lancaster NX636 is shown as the RAF aircraft that returns Theodore Honey to his employer at Farnborough after C.A.T.O. refuse to carry him either further, or to return him back, to the United Kingdom. Management at the Royal Aircraft Establishment consider the RAF obliged to accept the risk of carrying a potentially unhinged person as part of their regular flying duties.

== Allusions/references to actual history, geography and current science ==
Part of the novel is set in Canada (and in the Dominion of Newfoundland which had not yet, in the year 1949, become a part of Canada), a country that was very much "the Northern American land of dreams" for Shute—following his visit there in the 1930s aboard the dirigible R100, on whose development he had worked as a member of the design team under Barnes Wallis.

One observer has suggested that Shute may have been influenced in his description of the crash site by the 1946 crash at Hare Mountain (later Crash Hill), Newfoundland, of a Douglas C-54E which killed 39 people.

== Title ==
The title is taken from The Wanderer by John Masefield which Shute quotes at the start of the book:

Therefore, go forth, companion: when you find
No Highway more, no track, all being blind,
The way to go shall glimmer in the mind.

== Publication history ==
- First published in 1948 by William Heinemann, London.
- Reprinted in 2001 under ISBN 1-84232-273-7.

The initial US publication took place at the end of August 1948. But on publication BOAC objected to the use of its name without permission, and associated with aircraft disasters. It threatened to sue Heinemann unless its name was removed. British publication was therefore delayed until 13 December while all references to BOAC were changed to CATO.

== Adaptations ==
The film adaptation of the novel was released in 1951, starring James Stewart as Honey, Jack Hawkins as Scott, and Marlene Dietrich as Teasdale. The film was released as No Highway in the Sky in the United States and elsewhere. It presents Mr Honey as odd rather than being nervous at possible dismissal.

No Highway, a radio adaptation dramatised by Mike Walker with Paul Ritter as Honey, William Beck as Scott, and Fenella Woolgar as Teasdale was directed by Toby Swift for BBC Radio 4's Classic Serial in August 2010.

An earlier BBC Radio 4 Classic Serial, dramatised by Brian Gear in three episodes, and broadcast weekly from 11 May 1986, starred John Clegg as Theodore Honey, Norman Bowler as Scott, and Margaret Robertson as Monica Teasdale.
