= Requiem for a Wren =

Novel by Nevil Shute (1955)

Requiem For A Wren
- First edition, cover artist Val Biro.
- Author: Nevil Shute
- Language: English
- Publisher: William Heinemann Ltd
- Publication date: 1955
- LC Class: PZ3.N83 Re

Requiem For A Wren is a novel by Nevil Shute. It was first published in 1955 by William Heinemann Ltd. It was published in the United States under the title The Breaking Wave.

== Plot summary ==
The late 1940s story concerns two English women, Wrens, and two Australian brothers. It is narrated by one of the brothers, Alan Duncan. His brother Bill, a Royal Marine frogman, has been killed in action, and Alan is now returning to his wealthy parents' prosperous sheep station (ranch) in Australia. Alan has studied as a Rhodes Scholar at Oxford University and fought as an RAF pilot in World War II, but lost both feet when his plane crashed. He has recently qualified as a barrister in England.

His arrival home is marred by the apparent suicide, a few hours earlier, of a young Englishwoman named Jessie Proctor, who was his parents' housekeeper.

Alan guesses that this troubled woman must have left personal papers hidden somewhere in case she survived her suicide attempt. He searches the house and finds a small suitcase of letters, diaries, and her passport. He is appalled to learn that he knew her: she was, in fact, Janet Prentice, a former Wren and his late brother Bill's sweetheart. Together with another Wren, Viola Dawson, Alan has spent years searching for Janet after Bill's death.

Janet had a "lovely war" in Southern England, until tragic events around D-Day. In quick succession she lost Bill, then her father, and then her beloved dog. Her mother also died, shortly after the war. In addition, she believes herself responsible for the deaths of seven men, possibly allies, who were escaping in a German aeroplane which she had shot down.

Reading through Janet's diaries, Alan learns that she came to Australia to find Bill's family, and that she still feels she must atone for the deaths of the seven men. He realizes that, after Bill's death, he and Janet, though meeting only once, came to love each other, and ought to be the master and mistress of the family property; but now, the ghosts of Bill and Janet make it impossible for him to stay. But then he learns, as if from the ghosts, that he should "do the job for them"; and there is a woman in England, Viola, the other former Wren, who he should marry.
