= Lonely Road (novel) =

1932 novel

- Early edition
- Author: Nevil Shute
- Language: English
- Genre: Thriller
- Publisher: Heinemann (UK); William Morrow (US)
- Publication date: 1932
- Publication place: England
- Pages: 282 pp
- ISBN: 1-84232-261-3

Lonely Road is a novel by British author Nevil Shute. It was first published in 1932 by William Heinemann and in the US by William Morrow. In 1936 it was adapted as a film, Lonely Road, released in the US as Scotland Yard Commands, starring Clive Brook and Victoria Hopper. The novel also served as the basis for an episode (no 14) in the BBC series The Jazz Age in 1968.

== Plot summary ==
The book begins with a note from the solicitor for Commander Malcolm Stevenson, who has died recently (in about 1930). The note was written by him in the months before his death.

Stevenson's narration begins with a series of seemingly unrelated vignettes, of which the only one that is readily sensible occurred during World War I, leading the last survivors of a sinking decoy ship, Stevenson managed to sink a German submarine, and with the British survivors wounded and with no way of taking prisoners, killed the Germans as they attempted to surrender. That incident still haunts him. Quite wealthy, he runs a flotilla of coastal steamers in a desultory but increasingly profitable way. He awakens, after having been taken, injured, from a damaged car, on a night on which he has been drinking heavily.

Still bearing the mental and physical scars of the naval encounter, he meets a dancer, Mary (Mollie) Gordon (whom he nicknames Sixpence), at a dance hall in Leeds, where she entertains lonely gentlemen by dancing with them or sitting out a dance and talking, at sixpence a dance. He has the best evening he has had in years with Mollie.

The police call in Stevenson to consult on guns they have found being smuggled into the United Kingdom, found near a burned-out lorry. Stevenson cannot identify the guns, but puts together something Mollie said, and something said by his cousin by marriage, pioneer aviator Sir Phillip Stenning, and realises Mollie's brother may well have been the driver of the lorry. He approaches the police. Rather than risk publicity from a police interrogation, they ask Stevenson to do the initial questioning himself. They tell Stevenson they are convinced the guns are being smuggled in for an armed uprising in connection with the upcoming General Election, although they have no idea who is responsible.

Stevenson returns to Leeds, and approaches Mollie at her employment. Through artful questioning, he confirms she would be able to identify her brother's lorry. Torn between the desire to help the police, and his own growing affection for Mollie, he invites her down to his home in Devon for a platonic vacation. She agrees.

The morning after their arrivals, he takes her to the police station in Newton Abbot, where the police await. Stevenson watches as through gentle, but deceitful questioning, they get her to identify the lorry. They lead her to believe her brother is dead. Stevenson's sense of fair play is outraged, and he takes Mollie away to consult with his solicitor. After consultation, she tells all to the police, but knows little of help.

Stevenson and Mollie track down her brother, Billy, in Gloucester. Stevenson and Billy recognise each other. Stevenson is realising that he did not crash his car that night, but that, drunk, he went for a walk on the beach and was assaulted by men there, and the car crash was faked. Billy confesses involvement, admitting that he has been paid to take packages from a ship being landed on the coast to a barn. Sometimes, he would convey people as well. He little cared what he conveyed so long as he got paid. After Billy meets with Stevenson's solicitor, he is taken to the police. He can identify the destination of the goods, but what the police want is to interrupt the landing, catching the ship and everyone involved. Sir Phillip warns that this is a dangerous enterprise, but Stevenson allows Billy and Mollie to participate, and offers the services of one of his ships to help intercept the smugglers.

Billy is duly contacted by the smugglers for another run. As they prepare, Stevenson asks Mollie to marry him. She refuses him, until they have lived in the same house for a time and come to know each other better. As the police, Stevenson, and the others meet in his house, they are fired on. In seconds, Billy and one of the police are dead, and Mollie is wounded in the shoulder. Stevenson and Stenning go in pursuit of the gunmen, who try to escape by ship. Through expert ship handling and knowledge of the Channel tides, Stevenson manoeuvres the other ship into a position where she must run on to the rocks of "The Shackles" (probably his relocation of the genuine "Manacles" reef to a location off Dodman Point). Stevenson makes a token attempt to save the other vessel, but it fails (as Stevenson probably knows it would), and the ship sinks, killing the men aboard. Stevenson hurries to the hospital to see how Mollie is.

Mollie's wounds have become infected, and despite Stevenson sparing no expense for her care, her condition slowly worsens. After a night in which Stevenson remains by her bedside, pouring out his heart to her and telling her of his plans for them, she dies.

The gunmen's bodies are recovered, one Dutchman, one Russian (probably a Communist) and a recent Cambridge graduate. The embittered Stevenson tracks down the Cambridge man's contacts, and finds a female co-conspirator. They had smuggled guns and Communists into the country so that, at the proper moment, the plot could be exposed and blamed on the Labour Party, ensuring a Conservative victory. Stevenson, realising that the girl was present that night he was drunk and that she persuaded the others to spare his life, tells her of the deaths that have resulted from the actions, and leaves her to her conscience; first learning who was the brains of the conspiracy: a Cambridge political science don.

First taking precautions to ensure the story would survive his death, Stevenson goes to confront the don. The professor denies nothing, but attempts to defend his actions by telling his view of what must follow a Labour victory. Stevenson, realising the don lives in an ivory tower, gives the don an ultimatum: The story will be in the press, assuring a thumping Labour victory in the election now only days away (and the professor's arrest), unless the professor kills himself by Friday, four days before the election. The professor does so, falling "accidentally" from a high window, and Stevenson has little sympathy when told about how the professor's sister will be devastated.

Stevenson returns to his work on Monday, at least having assured that the election will not be influenced either way. He returns to his lonely road which he had shared with another for so brief a moment, and which will soon lead to his death.
