= Pastoral (Shute novel) =

1944 novel by Nevil Shute

- First US edition (William Morrow)
- Author: Nevil Shute
- Language: English
- Publication date: 1944

Pastoral is a novel by the English author Nevil Shute. It was first published in 1944 by Heinemann. Its theme is that even in the midst of war, and among warriors, everyday life, such as romance, will continue.

== Synopsis ==
Pastoral is a romance set on an English airbase which revolves around the pilot and crew of a Vickers Wellington bomber, their interest in fishing, and the pilot's developing relationship with a young WAAF signals officer.

== Reception ==
After its release the book received reviews from The Washington Post and The New York Times, the latter of which wrote that the book was "an excellent story and its writer grows in subtlety and skill with each succeeding novel".
