= Pied Piper (novel) =

1942 novel by Nevil Shute

First edition cover (William Morrow)

Pied Piper is a novel by Nevil Shute, first published in 1942. The title is a reference to the traditional German folk tale, "The Pied Piper of Hamelin".

== Plot summary ==
The story concerns a 70-year-old Englishman, John Sidney Howard, who goes on a fishing holiday in Jura, France partly to recover from grief at the loss of his son during the Battle of the Heligoland Bight. Although the Second World War has begun, he does not anticipate the speed with which the Nazi German forces invade France. His urgent desire to return home is delayed by a request made by an English couple he meets at the hotel. They ask him to take their two young children to England and safety. While delayed in Dijon by the sudden illness of one of the children, he accepts a request by one of the hotel maids to also take her young niece to safety in England where the child's father is working. Along the way, Howard accepts two more children: a boy whose parents were killed on the road by German aircraft, and a Dutch boy who is being attacked by panicking French villagers who mistake him for a German. Along the way he is overtaken by events and turns for help to some acquaintances in Chartres whom he barely knows, but remembers from a skiing holiday he took with his son, some years before.

Eventually, Howard and the children reach Brittany, hoping to escape Nazi-occupied France on a fishing boat. However, when one of the children is overheard speaking in English, the Nazis discover that Howard is an enemy Englishman and arrest him. He is accused of being a spy and threatened with death by the Gestapo, but in a final plot twist, the German commandant secretly allows Howard and the children to sail to England on the condition that they take his niece with them and send her to her uncle in the United States. His niece is apparently orphaned and had a "non-Aryan" mother.

The boat trip from France to England is successful and, ultimately, all the children are sent to the USA where they are cared for by Howard's daughter.

The tale is told in the form of a flashback by Howard to an acquaintance he meets in a London club during the Blitz.

== Adaptations ==
The story was filmed in 1942 and again in a 1989 made-for-television film Crossing to Freedom, also known as The Pied Piper. Howard was played in the 1942 film by Monty Woolley and by Peter O'Toole in the 1989 film.
