= Monty Woolley =

American actor (1888–1963)

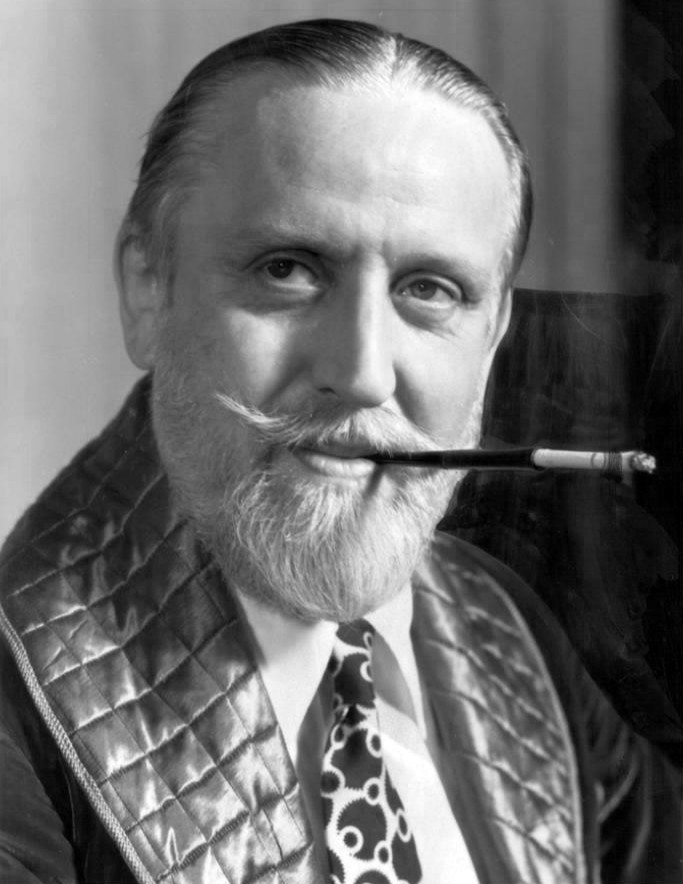
- Wooley as Sheridan Whiteside, 1942
- Born: Edgar Montillion Woolley; August 17, 1888; New York City, U.S.
- Died: May 6, 1963 (aged 74); Albany, New York, U.S.
- Resting place: Greenridge Cemetery, Saratoga Springs, Saratoga County, New York
- Occupations: Actor; director; professor
- Years active: 1929?–1955
- Known for: The Man Who Came to Dinner

Edgar Montillion "Monty" Woolley (August 17, 1888 – May 6, 1963) was an American film and theater actor. At the age of 50, he achieved a measure of stardom for his role in the 1939 stage play The Man Who Came to Dinner and its 1942 film adaptation. His distinctive white beard was his trademark and he was affectionately known as "The Beard."

Woolley was nominated twice for an Academy Award, for Best Actor in 1943 for The Pied Piper and for Best Supporting Actor in 1945 for Since You Went Away. He won a Best Actor award from the National Board of Review in 1942 for his role in The Pied Piper.

== Early life ==
Woolley was born in the New York City borough of Manhattan to William Edgar (1845–1927) and Jessie Woolley (1857–1927), née Arms, and grew up in the highest social circles. Woolley received a bachelor's degree at Yale University, where Cole Porter was a friend and classmate, and master's degrees from Yale and Harvard Universities. He eventually became an assistant professor of English and drama coach at Yale. Thornton Wilder and Stephen Vincent Benét were among his students. He served in World War I with the U.S. Army as a first lieutenant assigned to the general staff in Paris.

== Acting career ==
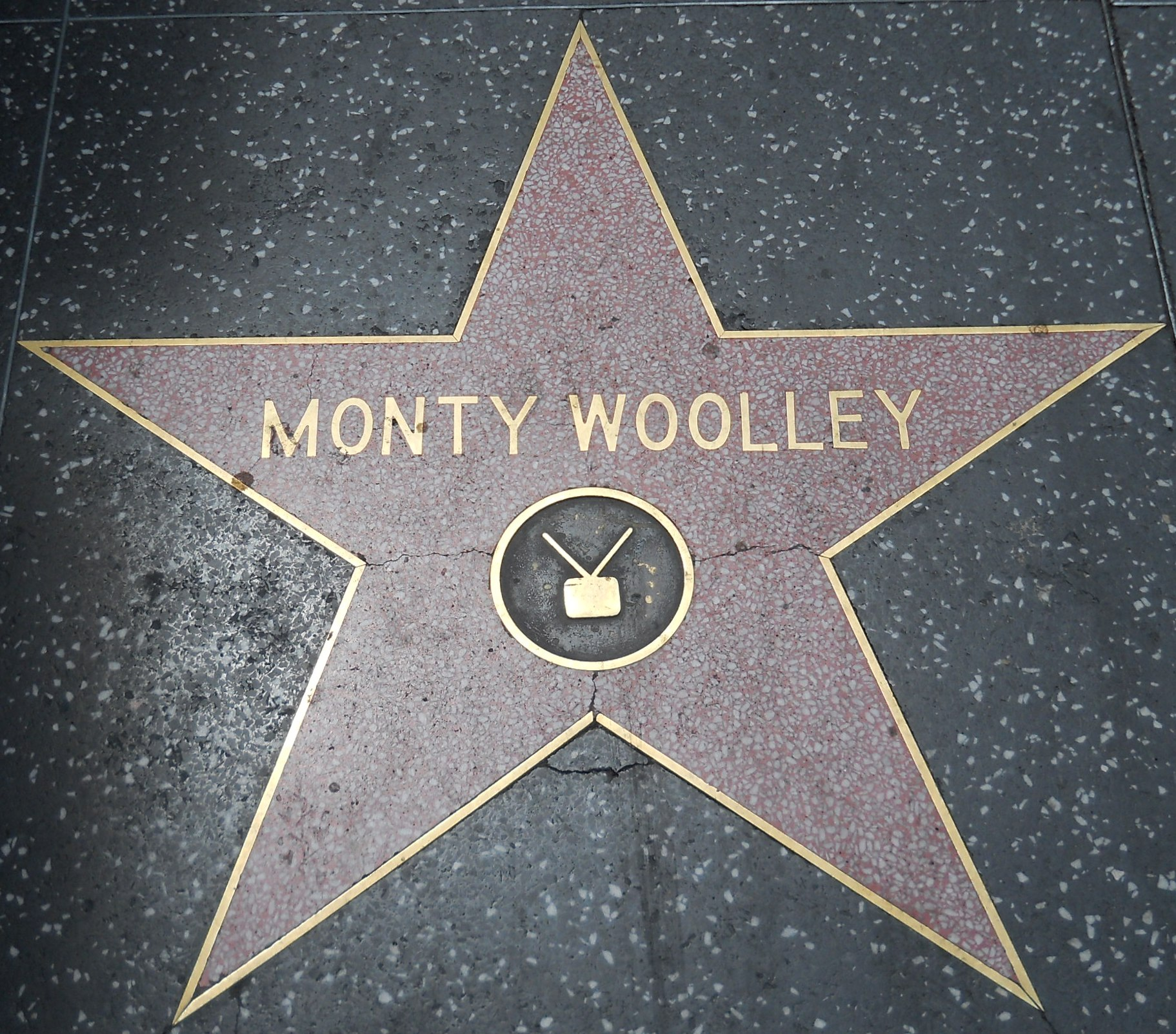
Hollywood Walk of Fame, 6542 Hollywood Blvd.

Woolley began directing on Broadway in 1929 with Fifty Million Frenchmen, and began acting there in 1936 after leaving his academic career. In 1939 he starred in the Kaufman and Hart comedy The Man Who Came to Dinner for 783 performances. It was for this well-reviewed role he was typecast as the wasp-tongued, supercilious sophisticate.

Woolley signed with 20th Century Fox in the 1940s and appeared in many films through the mid-1950s. His most famous film role, a reprise of his Broadway role, was in 1941's The Man Who Came To Dinner in which he plays a cranky radio wag restricted to a wheelchair because of a seemingly injured hip, a caricature of the legendary pundit Alexander Woollcott. The film received a good review from The New York Times. He played himself in Warner Bros.' fictionalized film biography of Cole Porter, Night and Day (1946), and the role of Professor Wutheridge in The Bishop's Wife (1947). In the comedy As Young as You Feel (1951), he played a printer who, fired routinely from his job at the age of 65, poses as an executive to get his job back.

He was also a frequent radio guest performer, first appearing in the medium as a foil to Al Jolson. Woolley became a familiar guest on such shows as The Fred Allen Show, Duffy's Tavern, The Big Show, The Chase and Sanborn Hour with Edgar Bergen and Charlie McCarthy, and others. In 1950, Woolley landed the starring role in the NBC series The Magnificent Montague. He played a former Shakespearean actor whose long fall onto hard times forced him to swallow his pride and take a role on daily network radio, becoming an unlikely star while sparring with his wife, Lily (Anne Seymour), and his wise-cracking maid, Agnes (Pert Kelton). The show lasted from November 1950 through September 1951.

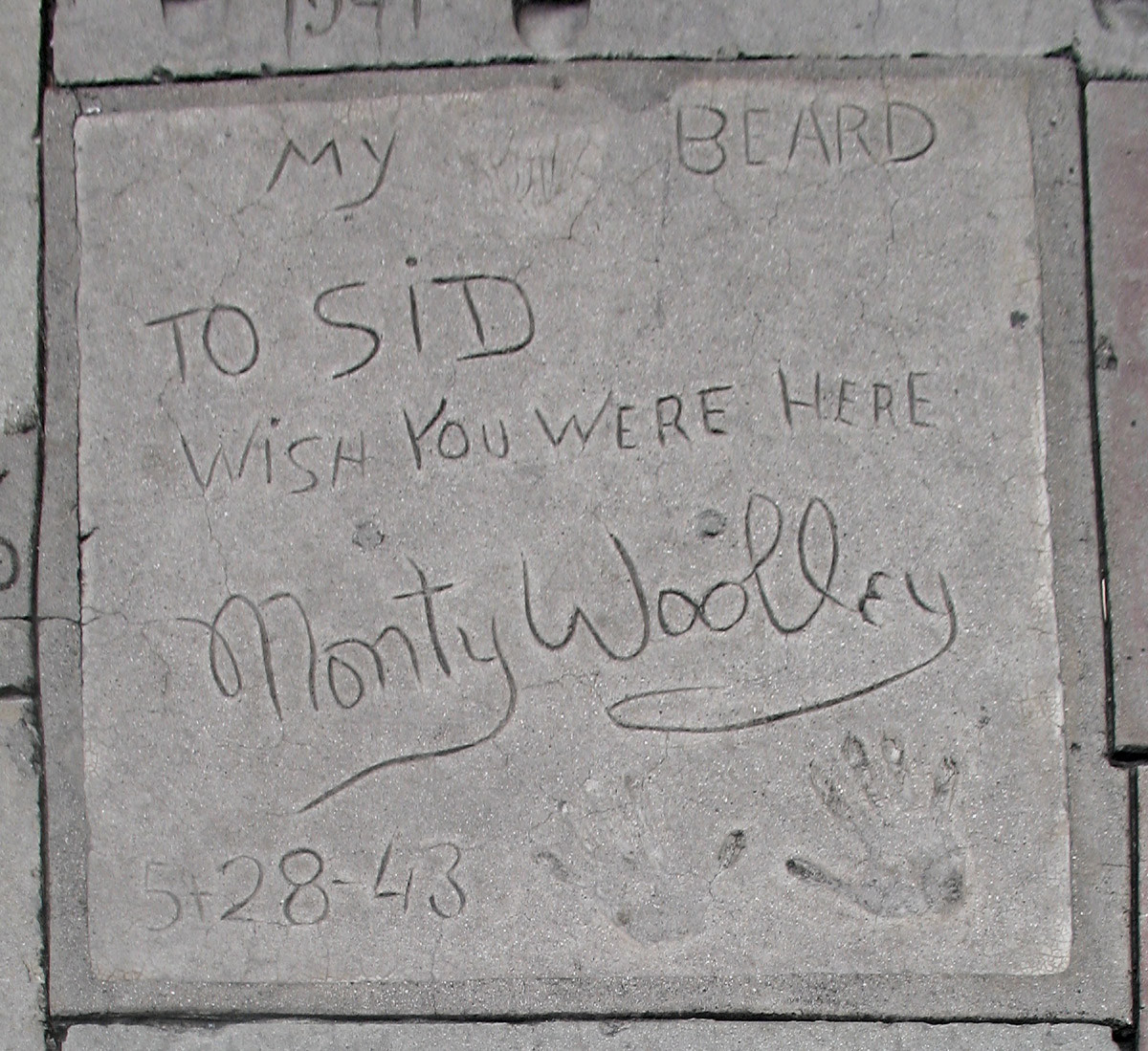
Hand and beard print at Grauman's Chinese Theatre.

Woolley first appeared on television in cameos, then in his own dramatic play series On Stage with Monty Woolley. He starred in a CBS TV adaptation of The Man Who Came to Dinner in 1954, which he and some reviewers lambasted, and appeared in other televised dramas in the series Best of Broadway. After completing his last film, Kismet (1955), he returned to radio for about a year, after which he was forced to retire due to ill health.

His hands and beard were impressed in the pavement of Grauman's Chinese Theatre in 1943. Woolley received a star on the Hollywood Walk of Fame in 1960, officially listed in the "Motion Picture" category, though his star bears the television emblem. The error of the television emblem was evident, considering his only TV efforts were his classic role as Sheridan Whiteside in a 1954 TV adaptation of The Man Who Came to Dinner, and another small role in an episode of a short-lived series called Five Fingers in 1959.

== Personal life ==
Woolley and Cole Porter enjoyed many adventures together in New York and on foreign travels, although Porter reportedly disapproved of Woolley taking a black man as his lover. Woolley has been described in scholarly and other works as gay and closeted.

Starting in 1939, Woolley was living with a gay companion, Cary Abbott, who had also graduated from Yale in 1911. Abbott was discreetly identified publicly as Woolley's "courier-secretary-traveling companion." In 1942, Woolley and Abbott moved into a house in Saratoga Springs, New York where they lived together until Abbott's death, at age 58, from lung cancer, in 1948.

According to Bennett Cerf in his 1944 book Try and Stop Me, Woolley was at a dinner party and suddenly belched. A woman sitting nearby glared at him; he glared back and said, "And what did you expect, my good woman? Chimes?" Cerf wrote, "Woolley was so pleased with this line that he insisted it be written into his next role in Hollywood."

In 1943, Alfred Hitchcock wrote a mystery story for Look titled "The Murder of Monty Woolley."

Woolley was portrayed by Allan Corduner in the 2004 biopic of Cole Porter, De-Lovely.

== Death ==
On April 6, 1963, Woolley was taken to the Saratoga Springs Hospital with heart problems, and two days later transferred to the Albany Hospital. He died of complications from kidney and heart ailments on May 6, 1963, in Albany, New York, aged 74. He is interred at the Greenridge Cemetery, Saratoga Springs, Saratoga County, New York.

== Stage ==
- Fifty Million Frenchmen (1929) - Director
- The Second Little Show (1930) - Director
- The New Yorkers (1930) - Director
- America's Sweetheart (1931) - Director
- Walk a Little Faster (1933) - Book director
- Champagne, Sec (1933) - Director
- Jubilee (1935) - Dialogue director
- On Your Toes (1936) - Sergei Alexandrovitch
- Knights of Song (1938) - His Royal Highness, Albert Edward
- The Man Who Came to Dinner (1939) - Sheridan Whiteside

== Complete filmography ==
- Ladies in Love (1936) (uncredited and unconfirmed)
- Live, Love and Learn (1937) - Mr. Bawltitude
- Nothing Sacred (1937) - Dr. Oswald Vunch (uncredited)
- Everybody Sing (1938) - John Fleming
- Arsène Lupin Returns (1938) - Georges Bouchet
- The Girl of the Golden West (1938) - Governor
- The Forgotten Step (1938 short) - The Art Collector
- Three Comrades (1938) - Dr. Jaffe
- Lord Jeff (1938) - Jeweler
- Vacation from Love (1938) - Wedding Guest in Car (uncredited)
- Young Dr. Kildare (1938) - Dr. Lane-Porteus
- Artists and Models Abroad (1938) - Gantvoort
- Zaza (1939) - Fouget
- Midnight (1939) - The Judge
- Never Say Die (1939) - Dr. Schmidt
- Man About Town (1939) - Henri Dubois
- Honeymoon in Bali (1939) - Parker, Smitty's Publisher (uncredited)
- Dancing Co-Ed (1939) - Professor Lange
- See Your Doctor (1939 short) - Doctor (uncredited)
- The Man Who Came to Dinner (1942) - Sheridan Whiteside
- The Pied Piper (1942) - John Sidney Howard
- Life Begins at Eight-Thirty (1942) - Madden Thomas
- Holy Matrimony (1943) - Priam Farll
- Since You Went Away (1944) - Col. William G. Smollett
- Irish Eyes Are Smiling (1944) - Edgar Brawley
- Molly and Me (1945) - John Graham
- Night and Day (1946) - himself
- Paris 1900 (1947 documentary) - Narrator (US version)
- The Bishop's Wife (1947) - Professor Wutheridge
- Miss Tatlock's Millions (1948) - Miles Tatlock
- As Young as You Feel (1951) - John R. Hodges
- Kismet (1955) - Omar

== Radio appearances ==
Year	Program	Episode/source
1942	Philip Morris Playhouse	The Man Who Came to Dinner
1943	Duffy's Tavern	Christmas show 12/21/43
1950	The Magnificent Montague	Comedy, 11/10/1950-11/10/1951
