= What Happened to the Corbetts =

1939 novel by Nevil Shute

- First edition
- Author: Nevil Shute
- Language: English
- Publisher: William Heinemann Ltd
- Publication date: 1939

What Happened to the Corbetts (US title: Ordeal) is a novel by Nevil Shute, a fictional depiction of the effect of aerial bombing on the British city of Southampton, a major maritime centre. It was written in 1938, and published in April 1939 by William Heinemann Ltd, when the outbreak of World War II was already a very likely development.

The novel addresses the issues of the aftermath of bombing, such as the spread of disease from lack of clean water, and what may be done to relieve the distress of those affected by it although the author concedes he "overlooked the importance of fire" as a consequence of bombing raids. On the initial day of publication, a thousand copies of the novel were distributed free of charge to members of the Air Raid Precautions team to inform them of what they might expect.

The novel does not say which nation is bombing Southampton and many other towns in England. France and the United States are neutral, but the Dominions except possibly Ireland declare war on Britain's side. Early in chapter 1 there is a mention of a newspaper cartoon which "represented the Prime Minister, very jocular, dangling a carrot before two donkeys separated from him by a wire fence. One of the donkeys had the head of Hitler, and the other, Mussolini".

== Plot ==
War begins for the United Kingdom after a surprise aerial bombing of 20 cities, the first of many attacks. Young solicitor Peter Corbett, wife Joan, and their three young children leave Southampton after their house and Corbett's offices are damaged, friends are killed, and a cholera epidemic begins. They move aboard their small yacht, kept on the river Hamble, but as disease spreads and supplies diminish, flee the area. They sail to the Isle of Wight, but because of the fear of disease, other ports require them to provide a certificate of health or wait in quarantine; the Corbetts do not want to risk being bombed during the three weeks of quarantine.

In the English Channel the family rescues two downed Fleet Air Arm aviators from HMS Victorious (R38). Their commanding officer gives the Corbetts supplies and suggests that the family sail to neutral France. While in quarantine at Brest, a friendly customs official states his belief that Britain will win the war because international horror of the enemy's terror bombing has caused the Dominions to enter the war and the neutral United States to provide aid. Corbett's family boards an ocean liner for Canada; because of his nautical experience, Corbett returns to the Victorious to accept a commission as sub-lieutenant from the Royal Navy Volunteer Reserve.
