= William Morrow (publisher) =

American publisher (1873–1931)

- Born: June 15, 1873; Dublin, Ireland
- Died: November 11, 1931 (aged 58); New York City, U.S.
- Education: Harvard College
- Occupation: Publisher
- Spouse: Honoré Willsie Morrow

William Morrow (June 15, 1873, in Dublin, Ireland – November 11, 1931, in New York City) was an American publisher. He attended Harvard College, class of 1900. At New York city, on April 24, 1923, he married novelist Honoré Willsie Morrow. He founded William Morrow and Company in 1926 and led it until his death.

== William Morrow and Company ==
William Morrow and Company was acquired by Scott, Foresman in 1967 and sold in 1981 to the Hearst Corporation, which sold it, along with Avon Books, to the News Corporation in 1999. Both William Morrow and Avon are now imprints of News Corp subsidiary HarperCollins.

Among many other authors, Morrow was Nevil Shute's American publisher for several of his novels. Morrow was the publisher for Erle Stanley Gardner's Perry Mason novels, among others.
