= Nevil Shute =

English novelist (1899–1960)

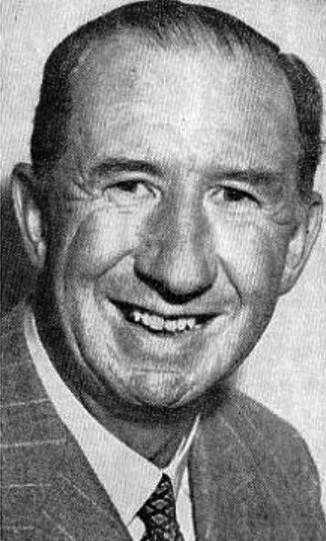
- Shute in 1949
- Born: Nevil Shute Norway; 17 January 1899; Ealing, Middlesex, England
- Died: 12 January 1960 (aged 60); Melbourne, Victoria, Australia
- Education: Balliol College, Oxford
- Occupations: Novelist; aeronautical engineer

Nevil Shute Norway (17 January 1899 – 12 January 1960) was an English novelist and aeronautical engineer who spent his later years in Australia. He used his full name in his engineering career and Nevil Shute as his pen name to protect his engineering career from inferences by his employers (Vickers) or from fellow engineers that he was "not a serious person" or from potentially adverse publicity in connection with his novels, which included On the Beach and A Town Like Alice.

== Early life ==
Shute was born at 16 Somerset Road, Ealing (which was then in Middlesex), in the tall and thin house described in his novel Trustee from the Toolroom. He was educated at the Dragon School, Shrewsbury School and Balliol College, Oxford; he graduated from Oxford in 1922 with a third-class degree in engineering science.

Shute was the son of Arthur Hamilton Norway and his wife Mary Louisa Gadsden. Shute's father became head of the Post Office in Ireland before the First World War and was based at the General Post Office, Dublin in 1916 at the time of the Easter Rising. Shute himself was later commended for his role as a stretcher-bearer during the rising. His grandmother Georgina Norway was a novelist.

Shute attended the Royal Military Academy, Woolwich and trained as a gunner. He failed the medical examination to take up a commission in the Royal Flying Corps in the First World War, which he believed was because of his stammer, and so he returned to civilian life. He enlisted in the ranks in August 1918 and served as a soldier in the Suffolk Regiment. He guarded the Isle of Grain in the Thames Estuary, and served in military funeral parties in Kent during the 1918 flu pandemic.

== Career in aviation ==
An aeronautical engineer as well as a pilot, Shute began his engineering career with the de Havilland Aircraft Company. He used his pen-name as an author to protect his engineering career from any potentially adverse publicity in connection with his novels.

Dissatisfied with the lack of opportunities for advancement, he took a position in 1924 with Vickers Ltd., where he was involved with the development of airships, working as Chief Calculator (stress engineer) on the R100 airship project for the Vickers subsidiary Airship Guarantee Company. In 1929, he was promoted to deputy chief engineer of the R100 project under Barnes Wallis. When Wallis left the project, Shute became the chief engineer.

The R100 was a prototype for passenger-carrying airships that would serve the needs of Britain's empire. The government-funded but privately developed R100 made a successful 1930 round trip to Canada. While in Canada it made trips from Montreal to Ottawa, Toronto, and Niagara Falls. The fatal 1930 crash near Beauvais, France, of its government-developed counterpart R101 ended British interest in dirigibles. The R100 was immediately grounded and subsequently scrapped.

Shute gives a detailed account of the development of the two airships in his 1954 autobiographical work, Slide Rule: Autobiography of an Engineer. When he started, he wrote that he was shocked to find that before building the R38 the civil servants concerned '"had made no attempt to calculate the aerodynamic forces acting on the ship"' but had just copied the size of girders in German airships. The calculations for just one transverse frame of the R100 could take two or three months, and the solution '"almost amounted to a religious experience." But later he wrote that '"the disaster was the product of the system rather than the men at Cardington"; the one thing that was proved is that "government officials are totally ineffective in engineering development" and any weapons (they develop) will be bad weapons. The R101 made one short test flight in perfect weather, and was given an airworthiness certificate for her flight to India to meet the minister's deadline. Norway thought it probable that a new outer cover for the R101 was taped on with rubber adhesive which reacted with the dope. His account is very critical of the R101 design and management team, and strongly hints that senior team members were complicit in concealing flaws in the airship's design and construction. In The Tender Ship, Manhattan Project engineer and Virginia Tech professor Arthur Squires used Shute's account of the R100 and R101 as a primary illustration of his thesis that governments are usually incompetent managers of technology projects.

In 1931, with the cancellation of the R100 project, Shute teamed up with the talented de Havilland-trained designer A. Hessell Tiltman to found the aircraft construction company Airspeed Ltd. A site was available in a former trolleybus garage on Piccadilly, York. Despite setbacks, including the usual problems of a new business, Airspeed Limited eventually gained recognition when its Envoy aircraft was chosen for the King's Flight. With the approach of the Second World War, a military version of the Envoy was developed, to be called the Airspeed Oxford. The Oxford became the standard advanced multi-engined trainer for the RAF and British Commonwealth, with over 8,500 being built.

For the innovation of developing a hydraulic retractable undercarriage for the Airspeed Courier, and his work on R100, Shute was made a Fellow of the Royal Aeronautical Society.

On 7 March 1931, Shute married Frances Mary Heaton, a 28-year-old medical practitioner. They had two daughters, (Heather) Felicity and Shirley.

== Second World War ==
By the outbreak of the Second World War, Shute was a rising novelist. Even as war seemed imminent he was working on military projects with his former boss at Vickers, Sir Dennistoun Burney. He was commissioned into the Royal Naval Volunteer Reserve (RNVR) as a sub-lieutenant, having joined as an "elderly yachtsman" and expected to be in charge of a drifter or minesweeper, but after two days he was asked about his career and technical experience. He reached the "dizzy rank" of lieutenant commander, knowing nothing about "Sunday Divisions" and secretly fearing when he went on a little ship that he would be the senior naval officer and "have to do something".

So he ended up in the Directorate of Miscellaneous Weapons Development. There he was a head of engineering, working on secret weapons such as Panjandrum, a job that appealed to the engineer in him. He also developed the Rocket Spear, an anti-submarine missile with a fluted cast iron head. After the first U-boat was sunk by it, Charles Goodeve sent him a message concluding "I am particularly pleased as it fully substantiates the foresight you showed in pushing this in its early stages. My congratulations."

His celebrity as a writer caused the Ministry of Information to send him to the Normandy Landings on 6 June 1944 and later to Burma as a correspondent. He finished the war with the rank of lieutenant commander in the RNVR.

== Literary career ==
Shute's first novel, Stephen Morris, was written in 1923, but not published until 1961 (with its 1924 sequel, Pilotage).

His first published novel was Marazan, which came out in 1926. After that he averaged one novel every two years until the 1950s, with the exception of a six-year hiatus while he was establishing his own aircraft construction company, Airspeed Ltd. Sales of his books grew slowly with each novel, but he became much better known after the publication of his third to last book, On the Beach, in 1957.

Shute's novels are written in a simple, highly readable style, with clearly delineated plot lines. Many of the stories are introduced by a narrator who is not a character in the story. The most common theme in Shute's novels is the dignity of work, spanning all classes, whether a Corsican bar hostess in the Balkans (Ruined City) or a brilliant but unworldly boffin (No Highway). His novels are in three main clusters: early pre-war flying adventures; Second World War tales; and stories set in Australia.

Another recurrent theme is the bridging of social barriers such as class (Lonely Road and Landfall), race (The Chequer Board), or religion (Round the Bend). The Australian novels are individual hymns to that country, with subtle disparagement of the mores of the United States (Beyond the Black Stump) and overt antipathy towards the post-World War II socialist government of Shute's native Britain (The Far Country and In the Wet).

Aviation and engineering provide the backdrop for many of Shute's novels. He identified how engineering, science, and design could improve human life and more than once used the anonymous epigram, "It has been said an engineer is a man who can do for ten shillings what any fool can do for a pound."

Several of Shute's novels explored the boundary between accepted science and rational belief, on the one hand, and mystical or paranormal possibilities, including reincarnation, on the other hand. Shute did this by including elements of fantasy and science fiction in novels that were considered mainstream. They included Buddhist astrology and folk prophecy in The Chequer Board; the effective use of a planchette in No Highway; a messiah figure in Round the Bend; reincarnation, science fiction, and Aboriginal psychic powers in In the Wet.

Twenty-four of his novels and novellas have been published. Many of his books have been adapted for the screen, including Lonely Road in 1936; Landfall: A Channel Story in 1949; Pied Piper in 1942 and again in 1959, and also as Crossing to Freedom, a CBS made-for-television movie, in 1990; On the Beach in 1959 and again in 2000 as a two-part miniseries; and No Highway in 1951. A Town Like Alice was adapted into a film in 1956, serialised for Australian television in 1981, and also broadcast on BBC Radio 2 in 1997 starring Jason Connery, Becky Hindley, Bernard Hepton and Virginia McKenna. Shute's 1952 novel The Far Country was filmed for television as six one-hour episodes in 1972, and as a two-part miniseries in 1987.

Vintage Books reprinted all 23 of his books in 2009.

Shute's final work was published more than 40 years after his death. The Seafarers was first drafted in 1946–47, rewritten, and then put aside. In 1948, Shute again rewrote it, changing the title to Blind Understanding, but he left the manuscript incomplete. According to Dan Telfair in the foreword of the 2002 edition, some of the themes in The Seafarers and Blind Understanding were used in Shute's 1955 novel Requiem for a Wren.

== Activities after the war ==
In 1948, Shute flew his own Percival Proctor aeroplane to Australia and back, accompanied by the writer James Riddell, who published a book, Flight of Fancy, based on the trip, in 1950.

On his return, after complaining that he "felt oppressed by British taxation", he decided that he and his family would move to Australia. In 1950, he settled with his wife and two daughters on farmland at Langwarrin, south-east of Melbourne. Remembering his 1930 trip to Canada and his decision to immigrate to Australia, he wrote, in 1954, "For the first time in my life I saw how people live in an English-speaking country outside England." Although he intended to remain in Australia, he did not apply for Australian citizenship, which was at that time a mere formality because he was a British citizen. In the 1950s and 1960s he was one of the world's best-selling novelists. Between 1956 and 1958 in Australia, he took up car racing as a hobby, driving a white Jaguar XK140. Some of this experience found its way into his book On the Beach.

Shute died in Melbourne in 1960 after a stroke.

== Honours ==
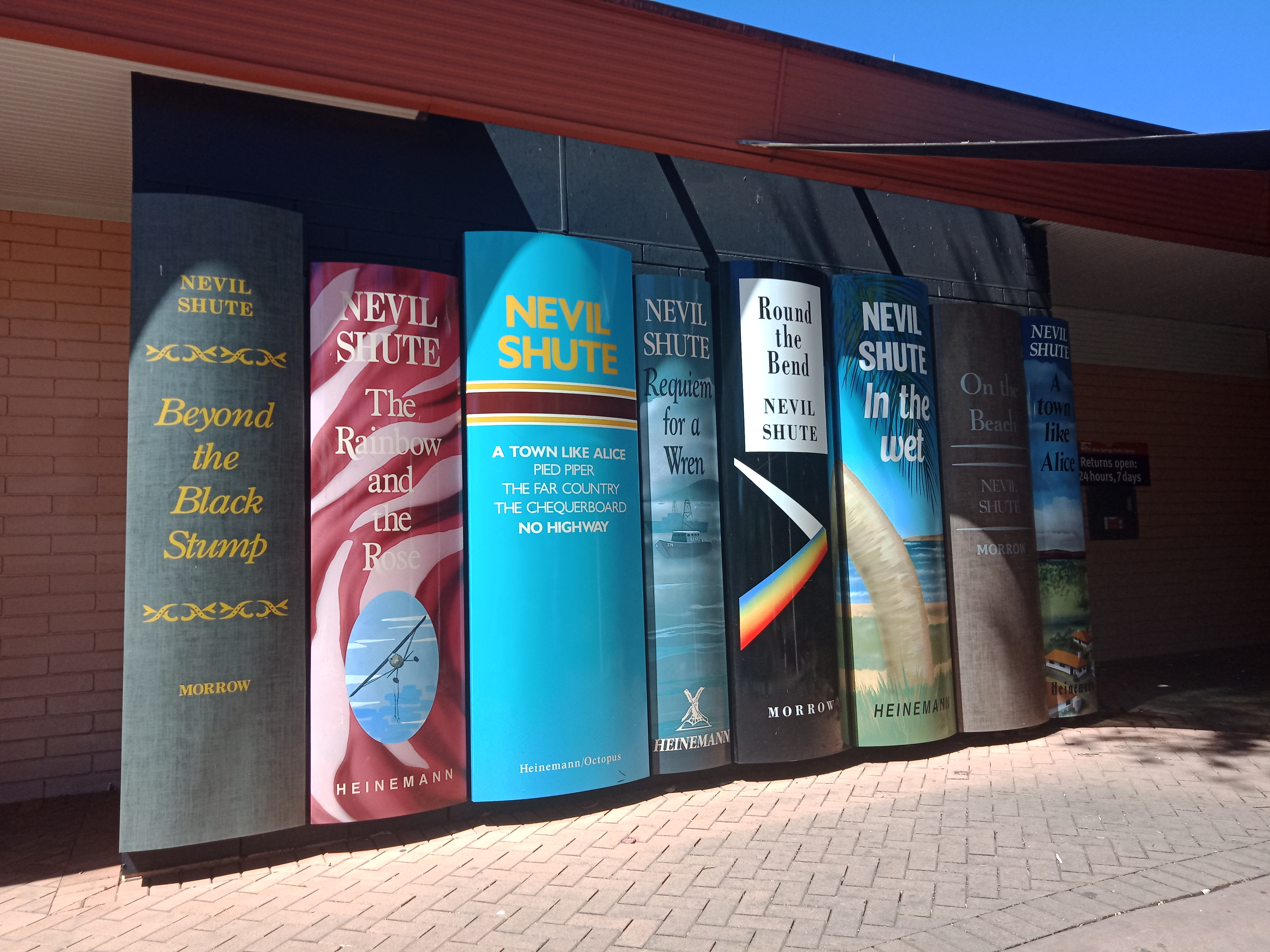
"BIG Books" at the Nevil Shute Memorial Library, Alice Springs (2018).

Norway Road and Nevil Shute Road at Portsmouth Airport, Hampshire were both named after him. Shute Avenue in Berwick, Victoria was named after him, when the farm used for filming the 1959 film On the Beach was subdivided for housing.

The public library in Alice Springs, Northern Territory is the Nevil Shute Memorial Library.

In the Readers' List of the Modern Library 100 Best Novels of the 20th century, A Town Like Alice came in at number 17, Trustee from the Toolroom at 27, and On the Beach at 56.

In the Australian Broadcasting Corporation's Top 100 Australian Books (2026), A Town Like Alice came in at number 69.

== Works ==
- Stephen Morris (1923, republished in 1961 with Pilotage)
- Pilotage (1924, republished in 1961 with Stephen Morris)
- Marazan (1926)
- So Disdained (1928). Also published as ‘The Mysterious Aviator’
- Lonely Road (1932)
- Ruined City (1938, U.S. title: Kindling)
- What Happened to the Corbetts (1938, U.S. title: Ordeal)
- An Old Captivity (1940)
- Landfall: A Channel Story (1940)
- Pied Piper (1942)
- Most Secret (1942, published 1945)
- Pastoral (1944)
- Vinland the Good (film script, 1946)
- The Seafarers (1946–7)
- The Chequer Board (1947)
- No Highway (1948)
- A Town Like Alice (1950, U.S. title: The Legacy)
- Round the Bend (1951)
- The Far Country (1952)
- In the Wet (1953)
- Slide Rule: Autobiography of an Engineer (1954)
- Requiem for a Wren (1955, U.S. title: The Breaking Wave)
- Beyond the Black Stump (1956)
- On the Beach (1957)
- The Rainbow and the Rose (1958)
- Trustee from the Toolroom (1960)
