= At the Villa Rose =

At the Villa Rose may refer to:

- At the Villa Rose (novel), a 1910 novel by the British novelist A. E. W. Mason, featuring Inspector Hanaud
- At the Villa Rose, a 1920 stage version of the novel by A. E. W. Mason
- At the Villa Rose (1920 film), a British silent film adaptation starring Manora Thew
- At the Villa Rose (1930 film), a British film adaptation starring Austin Trevor
- At the Villa Rose (1940 film), a British film adaptation starring Kenneth Kent

== See also ==
- The Mystery of the Villa Rose, a 1930 French film adaptation
