= The House of the Arrow =

The House of the Arrow may refer to:

- The House of the Arrow (novel), a 1924 detective novel by British writer A.E.W. Mason
- The House of the Arrow (1930 film), a 1930 British mystery film directed by Leslie S. Hiscott
- The House of the Arrow (1940 film), a 1940 film directed by Harold French
- The House of the Arrow (1953 film), a 1953 British mystery film directed by Michael Anderson
