= New religious movements and cults in popular culture =

New religious movements and cults have appeared as themes or subjects in literature and popular culture. Beginning in the 1700s authors in the English-speaking world began introducing members of cults as antagonists. Satanists, Yakuzas, Triads, Thugs, and sects of the Latter Day Saint movement were popular choices. In the twentieth century concern for the rights and feelings of religious minorities led authors to invent fictional cults for their villains to belong to. New religious movements and cults then began to appear in more modern culture in the 1950s and 1960s and became more prominent in the 1970s and 1980s into the 2000s. In the twenty-first century, popular awareness of new religious movements and cults continued to increase through their depiction in movies, TV shows, documentaries, and novels.

A new religious movement (NRM) is a religious community or ethical, spiritual, or philosophical group of modern origins, which has a peripheral place within its nation's dominant religious culture. NRMs may be novel in origin or they may be part of a wider religion, in which case they will be distinct from pre-existing denominations. Scholars continue to try to reach definitions and define boundaries. Around the world, it has been estimated that the amount of NRMs fall in the tens of thousands worldwide. Most NRMs will tend to only have a few members while some of them have thousands of members, and a few of them have more than a million members.

The word cult in current usage is a term often used to describe a new religious movement (NRM) or any group whose beliefs, practices, or organizational structures are viewed as abnormal, eccentric, or bizarre by the larger society. The term cult has been most commonly used as a pejorative term for a religious group that falls outside the mainstream and, by implication, engages in questionable activities. Many new religions are controversially labeled as cults. Cults are often depicted as organizations that exert control over their members, sometimes through manipulation (psychology), coercion, or psychological abuse.

At the same time, the label "cult" has been used in popular culture and media as a sensationalized term, contributing to stigmatization and fear of these groups, sometimes based more on social prejudice than factual analysis. Thus, it remains a highly charged term, with the potential for misapplication and overgeneralization, often leading to unfairly dismissing groups with unfamiliar or unconventional belief systems.

== Literature and film ==
=== Early twentieth century ===
In Dashiell Hammett's The Dain Curse (1929), much of the mystery puzzle revolves around the Temple of the Holy Grail, a fictitious California circle that Hammett's characters repeatedly describe as a "cult". Hammett depicts it as starting as a scam, although the putative leader begins to believe in his own fraudulent claims.

A.E.W. Mason, in The Prisoner in the Opal (1928), one of his Inspector Hanaud mysteries, describes the unmasking of a Satanist cult.

Aldous Huxley wrote the dystopian novel, Brave New World (1932) which is set in a future society where traditional religion has been replaced by a secular, state-enforced belief system. The novel critiques the loss of spiritual depth in favor of mass consumerism and artificial happiness. While not a traditional cult, the state-sponsored religious-like movement, "Community, Identity, Stability", functions like a cult in that it enforces absolute conformity through ritualistic behaviors and psychological conditioning.

American writer H. P. Lovecraft had a hand in cosmic horror through the 1920s-1930s. Lovecraft’s cosmic horror often involved secretive cults worshipping ancient gods or supernatural entities, a reflection of fears surrounding the marginalization of traditional religious systems and the rise of unconventional beliefs. In Lovecraft’s "The Call of Cthulhu" (1928), a cult is central to the narrative, worshipping the Cthulhu entity, a monstrous being said to control and manipulate those who follow it. The cults in Lovecraft’s works, such as the Cult of Cthulhu, are often depicted as depraved, secretive, and capable of dangerous power, serving as metaphors for humanity’s insignificant place in the universe and the dangers of unknown forces.

=== Mid and late twentieth century ===
Science-fiction writer Robert A. Heinlein wrote two novels that deal with fictional cult-like groups. A leading figure in his early "Future History" series (see "If This Goes On—", a short novel published in Revolt in 2100), Nehemiah Scudder, a religious "prophet", becomes dictator of the United States. By his own admission in an afterword, Heinlein poured into this book his distrust of all forms of religious fundamentalism, the Ku Klux Klan, the Communist Party and other movements that he regarded as authoritarian. Heinlein also stated in the afterword that he had worked out the plot of other books about Scudder, but had decided not to write them — in part because he found Scudder so unpleasant. Heinlein's novel Stranger in a Strange Land features two cults: the "Dionysian Church of the New Revelation, Fosterite", and the protagonist Valentine Michael Smith's own "Church of All Worlds". Heinlein treats of the motives and methods of religious leaders in some detail.

In That Hideous Strength, C. S. Lewis describes the National Institute for Co-ordinated Experiments, or "NICE", a quasi-governmental front concealing a kind of doomsday cult that worships a disembodied head kept alive by scientific means. Lewis' novel is notable for its elaboration of his 1944 address "The Inner Ring." The latter work criticizes the lust to "belong" to a powerful clique — a common human failing that Lewis believed was the basis for people being seduced into power-hungry and spiritually twisted movements.

In William Campbell Gault's Sweet Wild Wench, L.A. private eye Joe Puma investigates the "Children of Proton", a fictional cult that has attracted the support of the daughter of a wealthy businessman.

Gore Vidal's Messiah depicts the rise of Cavism, a nontheistic new religion of radical death acceptance, from its origins as a fringe cult to its ultimate takeover of the established world order. Vidal's Kalki, a science-fiction novel, recounts how a small but scientifically adept cult kills off the entire human race by means of germ warfare.

In the 1977 short story "Children of the Corn" by Stephen King and the film franchise based on it, the town of Gatlin in Nebraska ends up under the control of a cult of children who worship an evil entity called "He Who Walks Behind the Rows" living in the cornfields.

=== Twenty-first century ===
Popular French author Michel Houellebecq's 2005 science-fiction novel, The Possibility of an Island, describes a cloning group that resembles the Raëlians.

Robert Muchamore has written a book for teenagers, Divine Madness, about a religious cult that has a vast number of members: the main characters of the book must infiltrate to discover a sinister plot.

The novel Godless centers around a teenager who forms a religious cult that worships his hometown's water tower.

The Hulu series The Path revolves around a fictional NRM, the Meyerist Movement, and explores the lives of members as they struggle with faith, power, and manipulation. The show blends elements of psychological drama and thriller, illustrating how cults can control individuals and shape their worldview. The Meyerist Movement is not based on any real-world religion but seems to borrow elements from various real cults and NRMs, such as Scientology and the Hare Krishna movement.

In 2018, the documentary series called Wild Wild Country came to Netflix. The series chronicles showed the rise and fall of the Rajneeshpuram community in Oregon, led by Bhagwan Shree Rajneesh (later known as Osho). The series provides a detailed and balanced exploration of the community’s complex dynamic, highlighting both the allure of the Rajneesh’s teachings and the destructive behaviors of his followers.

The Vow, another documentary series on HBO, examines the NXIVM cult, led by Keith Raniere. NXIVM presented itself as a self-help organization but was later exposed as a sex-trafficking and exploitation ring. The show delves into how charismatic leadership, manipulation, and exploitation can be disguised as self-improvement programs, capturing the psychological and emotional traps set by cult leaders.

In 2019, a horror film called Midsommar directed by Ari Aster was released. It presents a Swedish pagan cult that lures a group of Americans to participate in an idyllic yet disturbing midsummer festival. As the group becomes entangled in the cult's rituals, the film critiques the dangers of groupthink, blind obedience, and the allure of belonging.

The Master, directed by Paul Thomas Anderson, follows the rise of a charismatic leader, Lancaster Dodd (a character loosely inspired by Scientology founder L. Ron Hubbard). The film examines the psychological effects of blind devotion to a powerful figure and the way cults use psychological techniques to entrench their followers.

Karyn Kusama directed The Invitation, a psychological thriller centered around a dinner party where the guests slowly realize that the hosts have become involved in a mysterious cult. The film explores themes of grief, manipulation, and the subtle ways in which cults can prey on individuals' vulnerabilities, offering a commentary on the dangers of ideological extremism and the ease with which people can be manipulated into harmful beliefs.

The Girls is a novel that draws inspiration from the Manson Family cult, specifically the events surrounding the infamous murders committed by Charles Manson’s followers in the 1960s. While the story is fictional, it explores how vulnerable young women can be seduced into dangerous cults, manipulated by a charismatic leader, and subjected to a groupthink mentality. The novel critiques the social dynamics within cults and how they prey on the emotional needs of their members.

The Religion is a novel published by Tim Willocks in 2006. While not entirely set in the 21st century, Willocks' novel takes place in the historical context of the Crusades and reflects how cult-like movements and religious extremism have always been part of human history. It critiques the way religious fervor can justify violence and manipulation.

Going Clear: Scientology and the Prison of Belief is a HBO documentary, based on Lawrence Wright’s book Going Clear, critiquing the Church of Scientology and its leader, David Miscavige. It sheds light on the organization’s psychological manipulation, aggressive tactics against critics, and its ability to retain control over followers. It uses interviews with former members to expose the inner workings of Scientology and has helped reignite public scrutiny of the church.

The documentary Holy Hell follows the experiences of former members of the Buddha Field, a Los Angeles-based cult led by a man named Michel, who presented himself as a spiritual guru. The film offers a firsthand look at the emotional and psychological toll cults can have on individuals, including the exploitation and manipulation of vulnerable members

=== Literary works by founders of new trends or movements ===
Aleister Crowley, founder of the English-speaking branch of Ordo Templi Orientis and of a short-lived commune (the "Abbey of Thelema") in Sicily, wrote poetry (anthologized in 1917 in The Oxford Book of English Mystical Verse) and novels (Diary of a Drug Fiend (1922) and Moonchild (1929)). Crowley died in 1947. His autobiography, The Confessions of Aleister Crowley, republished in 1969, attracted much attention. The Encyclopedia of Fantasy describes Crowley's fiction and his manuals on the occult as examples of "lifestyle fantasy".

The travel writer, poet and painter Nicholas Roerich, the founder of Agni Yoga, expressed his spiritual beliefs through his depiction of the stark mountains of Central Asia. His classic travel books include Heart of Asia: Memoirs from the Himalayas (1929) and Shambhala: In Search of the New Era (1930).

L. Ron Hubbard, the founder of Scientology, worked as a contributing author in the Golden Age of Science Fiction (1930s to 1950s) and in the horror and fantasy genres. In a bibliographical study of his works, Marco Frenschkowski agrees with Stephen King in regarding Fear (1940) as one of the major horror tales of the 20th century, and praises "its imaginative use of the prosaic and its demythologizing of traditional weird fiction themes". Other works which Frenschkowski cites as notable include Typewriter in the Sky (1940), To the Stars (1950), the best-selling Battlefield Earth (1982), and the ten-volume Mission Earth (1985–1987). Frenschkowski concludes that although Hubbard's fiction has received excessive praise from his followers, science-fiction critics leery of Scientology have underrated it. John Clute and Peter Nichols, however, manage to praise much of Hubbard's oeuvre while also raising questions about the thematic link to Scientology. Hubbard's "canny utilization of superman protagonists" in his early work, they argue, came to "tantalize" science-fiction writers and fans "with visions of transcendental power" and may explain why so many early followers of Hubbard's movement came from the science fiction community.

G.I. Gurdjieff, the Greek-Armenian mystic and spiritual teacher who introduced and taught the Fourth Way, authored three literary works that comprise his All and Everything trilogy. The best known, Meetings with Remarkable Men, a memoir of Gurdjieff's youthful search for spiritual truth, has become a minor classic. Peter Brook made it into a film (1979). The trilogy also includes Beelzebub's Tales to His Grandson, a curious melange of philosophy, humor and science fiction that some regard as a masterpiece. P.L. Travers, author of the Mary Poppins series and a disciple of Gurdjieff, described Beelzebub as "soaring off into space, like a great, lumbering flying cathedral". Martin Seymour-Smith included Beelzebub in his 100 Most Influential Books Ever Written, characterising it as "...the most convincing fusion of Eastern and Western thought that has yet been seen." Gurdjieff's final volume, Life is Real Only Then, When 'I Am', consists of an incomplete text published posthumously.

Eli Siegel, the founder of Aesthetic Realism, wrote highly regarded poetry. William Carlos Williams described his "Hot Afternoons Have Been in Montana" (1925) as his "major poem", and wrote that Siegel "belongs in the first ranks of our living artists". Other critics and poets who praised Siegel's work included Selden Rodman and Kenneth Rexroth; the latter wrote that "it's about time Eli Siegel was moved up into the ranks of our acknowledged Leading Poets."

=== Important non-fiction writers among founders of movements ===
Helena Blavatsky, the Russian adventuress who founded Theosophy, wrote Isis Unveiled (1887) and The Secret Doctrine (1888), and had an immense cultural and intellectual influence in the late 19th and early 20th centuries, helping to stimulate the Indian nationalist movement, parapsychology, the fantasy literary genre, and the New Age movement. The Encyclopedia of Fantasy describes her two major books as "enormous, entrancing honeypots of myth, fairytale, speculation, fabrication and tomfoolery".

Rudolf Steiner (1861–1925), the founder of Anthroposophy, wrote across a variety of fields, with his collected works totaling approximately 350 volumes. Steiner's influence extended to notable figures such as the novelist Hermann Hesse and the philosopher Owen Barfield, both of whom were inspired by his teachings. Through his writings and lectures, Steiner played a pivotal role in the development of several important movements and practices, including the cooperative movement, alternative medicine, organic farming, the Waldorf schools, and "eurythmy."

== See also ==
- Cult
- New religious movement
- Sociological classifications of religious movements
- List of new religious movements
