= Room 13 =

Room 13 may refer to:

== Books ==
- Room 13 (Wallace novel), 1924 first of the Mr. Reeder detective stories
- Room 13 (Swindells novel), children's novel

== Film ==
- Room 13 (1942 film), a French crime film directed by André Hugon
- Room 13 (1964 film) (German Zimmer 13), a West German adaption of the Wallace novel directed by Harald Reinl

== Music ==
- "Room 13", 1981 song by Black Flag from Damaged (Black Flag album)
- "Room 13", 2007 song from Rise Above (Dirty Projectors album)

== See also ==
- Number 13 (short story)
- Room 13 International
