= The House of the Arrow (1953 film) =

1953 film by Michael Anderson

- Australian daybill poster
- Directed by: Michael Anderson
- Written by: Edward Dryhurst
- Based on: The House of the Arrow by A. E. W. Mason
- Produced by: Vaughan N. Dean
- Starring: Oskar Homolka; Yvonne Furneaux; Robert Urquhart and
- Cinematography: Erwin Hillier
- Edited by: Edward B. Jarvis
- Music by: Gerald Crossman
- Production company: ABPC
- Distributed by: Associated British-Pathé (UK)
- Release date: August 1953
- Running time: 73 minutes
- Country: United Kingdom
- Language: English

The House of the Arrow is a 1953 British mystery film directed by Michael Anderson and starring Oskar Homolka, Robert Urquhart and Yvonne Furneaux. It was written by Edward Dryhurst and is the fourth film version of the 1924 novel The House of the Arrow by A. E. W. Mason, featuring his French detective Inspector Hanaud.

== Plot ==
Madame Harlowe angers her brother-in-law Boris Wabersky when she bequeathes all her money to her adopted niece, Betty Harlowe. Boris accuses Betty of poisoning her aunt for the money. Inspector Hanaud believes that Madame Harlowe's death is linked to a recent series of poison pen letters sent to people in Dijon. He later finds that she was killed by an arrow dipped in poison.

== Cast ==
- Oskar Homolka as Inspector Hanaud
- Robert Urquhart as Jim Frobisher
- Yvonne Furneaux as Betty Harlowe
- Josephine Griffin as Ann Upcott
- Harold Kasket as Boris Wabersky
- Pierre Lefevre as Detective Maurice Thevenet
- Pierre Chaminade as Detective Moreau
- Jacques Cey as Police Commissaire Giradot
- Keith Pyott as Gaston, the butler
- Andrea Lea as Francine, the maid
- Rene Leplay as Hanaud's Clerk
- Anthony Nicholls as Lawyer Jarrett
- Ruth Lodge as Nurse Jeanne Baudin

== Critical reception ==
The Monthly Film Bulletin wrote: "This adaptation of A. E. W. Mason's novel has contrived to lose most of the tension and excitement of the original. Direction and playing – in particular that of the two leading ladies – are generally flat and unconvincing; Oscar Homolka, though, brings a little life and colour to his characterisation of Hanaud."

Kine Weekly wrote: "Polished and intriguing who-dunnit, staged in France ... Atmosphere, heightened by accordion accompaniment, is particularly effective and, together with sound acting – Oscar Homolka is ideally cast as the 'tec' – and resourceful direction gives a new look to the no longer original tale. ... The picture approaches crime from a piquant angle, and its saucy asides artfully balance grisly fundamentals."

In British Sound Films: The Studio Years 1928–1959 David Quinlan rated the film as "good", writing: "Laughs and thrills skilfully handled: Homolka steals the show"

Allmovie wrote, "one advantage the 1953 version of House of the Arrow has over the first versions is the bluff, hearty presence of Oscar Homolka, who could entertain an audiences by reading the want ads if he so desired."

Britmovie noted, "director Michael Anderson handles the thrills pleasantly and the noir suspense is balanced out by Hanaud’s conceited humour with fine results. Austrian actor Oscar Homolka produces a fine portrayal of Mason’s super-smug detective of the French Surete, and the rest of the Anglo-French cast provide sterling support in this well turned-out thriller."
