= The Affair at the Semiramis Hotel =

1917 detective novella by A.E.W. Mason

- US first edition, Charles Scribner's Sons 1917
- Author: A. E. W. Mason
- Language: English
- Series: Inspector Hanaud
- Genre: Detective fiction
- Set in: London
- Publication date: 1917
- Media type: Print
- Preceded by: At the Villa Rose
- Followed by: The House of the Arrow

The Affair at the Semiramis Hotel is a 1917 detective novella by the British writer A. E. W. Mason featuring his character Inspector Hanaud. Mason had originally written many of the plot elements for an abortive silent film, to be called The Carnival Ball. The novella appeared between Mason's first full-length Hanaud novel, At the Villa Rose (1910), and his second, The House of the Arrow (1934).

== Plot ==
The story is set in London, after the events described in At the Villa Rose. Ricardo, the dilettante amateur detective, is sitting at his breakfast table in Grosvenor Square when he is interrupted by his friend Gabriel Hanaud, the French professional detective.

A visitor is unexpectedly shown in: a fashionable young man named Calladine whom Ricardo has not seen for several months. Visibly distressed, Calladine blurts out a fantastic tale of having attended a ball at the Semiramis Hotel the night before, and having met a young woman dressed in a distinctive masquerade costume who early next morning had turned up unannounced at his chambers seeking sanctuary. He reports that the young woman, Joan Carew, an opera singer, confessed that she had been tempted by a valuable pearl necklace worn by one of the hotel guests, and that she had crept into the woman's room to try to steal it. On entering, she found that she had inadvertently disturbed and been seen by two masked men who were also there to steal the pearls. She fainted, and when she came round discovered that the men had disappeared and that she was alone with the necklace's dead owner. She had immediately rushed over to Calladine's chambers.

Hanaud and Ricardo accompany Calladine across town to his chambers, and initially conclude that he imagined the whole thing when they discover that he is a user of the drug mescal, known for its ability to create colourful hallucinations. But then the newspapers report the crime. Joan Carew repeats her story to the two men, and later tells them that in a dream she thought she saw the mask of one of the thieves slip so that she could see his face. The unmasked man is André Favart, companion of the opera star Carmen Valeri, one of Joan Carew's professional colleagues.

With the assistance of the director of the Opera House, Hanaud gets Joan Carew to sing her role in that night's production dressed in the distinctive costume she was wearing when she had disturbed the thieves. Then, after the performance, he arranges for Favart to bump into her. When Favart realises who she is, and that he has been recognised, he attempts to run but is detained and arrested for murder. The stolen necklace has been hidden in plain sight amongst the paste jewellery worn on stage by the unknowing Carmen Valeri.

Calladine and Joan Carew are soon married.

== Principal characters ==
- Inspector Gabriel Hanaud: a French professional detective
- Julius Ricardo: his friend, a dilettante amateur detective
- Calladine: a fashionable young man
- Joan Carew: a young opera singer
- Carmen Valeri: an opera star
- André Favart: her companion

== Background ==
In the years immediately before the Great War Mason started to develop an interest in the then-new medium of cinema. Several of his previous novels had been adapted for the silent screen, and he started work on a purpose-written screenplay for a proposed film to be called The Carnival Ball. This never materialised, but Mason reused many of the ideas within it, initially with a view to incorporating them into his novel The Summons on which he was then working, but eventually publishing them as a separate long story/novella The Affair at the Semiramis Hotel. Some writers list the work with Mason's short stories.

== Publication ==
The Affair at the Semiramis Hotel was published as a long story in The Story-Teller magazine for March 1917, and was collected in The Four Corners of the World, published by Hodder and Stoughton in the same year. In the US it was published as a standalone novella by Charles Scribner's Sons.

== Bibliography ==
- Green, Roger Lancelyn (1952). A. E. W. Mason. London: Max Parrish.
- Hayne, Barrie (1984). "A. E. W. Mason". In Bargainnier, Earl F. (ed.). Twelve Englishmen of Mystery. Bowling Green, Ohio: Bowling Green University popular Press. ISBN 0-87972-250-9.
- Barzun, Jacques; Taylor, Wendall Hertig (1989). A Catalogue of Crime (2nd ed.). New York: Harper & Row. ISBN 0-06-015796-8.
