= The House of the Arrow (1930 film) =

1930 film

- Theatrical release poster
- Directed by: Leslie S. Hiscott
- Written by: A.E.W. Mason (play); Cyril Twyford
- Produced by: Henry Edwards; Julius Hagen
- Starring: Dennis Neilson-Terry; Benita Hume; Richard Cooper
- Production company: Julius Hagen Productions
- Distributed by: Warner Brothers
- Release date: March 1930
- Running time: 76 minutes
- Country: United Kingdom
- Language: English
- Budget: $80,000
- Box office: $200,000

The House of the Arrow is a 1930 British mystery film directed by Leslie S. Hiscott and starring Dennis Neilson-Terry, Benita Hume and Richard Cooper. It was written by Cyril Twyford based on the 1924 book The House of the Arrow, and its subsequent stage play adaptation by A.E.W. Mason, part of his Inspector Hanaud series. It was one of four film adaptations of the story. A quota quickie, it was made at Twickenham Studios and distributed by the American company Warner Brothers.

A separate French-language version La Maison de la Fléche, directed by Henri Fescourt, was also produced at Twickenham

A follow-up film, At the Villa Rose, was made in the same year, directed by Hiscott, with Austin Trevor replacing Neilson-Terry as Inspector Hanaud.

== Preservation status ==
The British Film Institute National Archive holds a collection of stills but no film or video materials.

== Plot ==
When Mrs. Harlow dies unexpectedly, her brother-in-law accuses her niece, Betty, of murder. The body is exhumed, and an examination shows no trace of poison. When Inspector Hanaud investigates, his suspicion falls both on the mother-in-law and Mrs. Harlow's companion, Ann Upcott. However Hanaud catches Betty trying to poison Ann, and is able to prove her guilty of the murder of Mrs. Harlow.

== Cast ==
- Dennis Neilson-Terry as Inspector Hanuad
- Benita Hume as Betty Harlow
- Richard Cooper as Jim Frobisher
- Stella Freeman as Ann Upcott
- Wilfred Fletcher as Wabersky
- Tony De Lungo as Maurice Thevene
- Barbara Gott as Mrs Harlow
- Betty de Malero as Francine

== Reception ==
Kine Weekly wrote: "Another success for Leslie Hiscott. ...Very good acting and production generally ... The story is too complicated to put in short synopsis form, but Leslie Hiscott handles it admirably, without trying to confuse the issues. There is sensible deduction here, and not just haphazard discoveries. The tension is held and the denouement well concealed until the final scene."

Picture Show called the film: "An entertaining picture."
