= No Other Tiger =

1927 novel

- First edition (UK)
- Author: A.E.W. Mason
- Language: English
- Genre: Mystery
- Publisher: Hodder and Stoughton (UK); George H. Doran (US)
- Publication date: 1927
- Publication place: United Kingdom
- Media type: Print

No Other Tiger is a 1927 mystery thriller novel by the British writer A.E.W. Mason. Julius Ricardo, who features in the Inspector Hanaud series, briefly appears and Hanaud himself is mentioned in passing.

== Synopsis ==
While tiger hunting in Burma, Colonel John Strickland encounters no tigers but meets a strange man who has news of the woman back in England that Strickland is in love with. His adventures subsequently take him to England and Southern France.

== Bibliography ==
- Bargainnier, Earl F. Twelve Englishmen of Mystery. Popular Press, 1984.
- Reilly, John M. Twentieth Century Crime & Mystery Writers. Springer, 2015.
