= Inspector Hanaud =

A. E. W. Mason's fictional detective

- First appearance: At the Villa Rose
- Last appearance: The House in Lordship Lane
- Created by: A. E. W. Mason
- Portrayed by: Teddy Arundell; Austin Trevor; Dennis Neilson-Terry; Kenneth Kent; Francis L. Sullivan; Anthony Holles; Oskar Homolka; Richard Pasco; Andrew Sachs

In-universe information
- Gender: Male
- Title: Inspector
- Occupation: Police Officer
- Nationality: French

Inspector Gabriel Hanaud is a fictional French detective depicted in a series of five novels, one novella and one short story by the British writer A. E. W. Mason. He has been described as the "first major fiction police detective of the Twentieth Century".

== Background ==
Hanaud was modelled on two real-life heads of the Paris Sûreté, Gustave Macé and Marie-François Goron, whose respective memoirs Mason had studied. Émile Gaboriau's Monsieur Lecoq was also an inspiration.

Mason wanted Hanaud to be a professional detective who was as physically unlike Sherlock Holmes as possible so, in contrast to the slender Holmes, Hanaud became stout and broad-shouldered. He was to be a genial and friendly soul ready, "as the French detective does", to trust his flair or intuition and to take the risk of acting upon it. In the stories, Hanaud often relies on psychological methods to solve cases. He is generally assisted by his friend, the fastidious Julius Ricardo, a former City of London financier.

Hanaud made his first appearance in the 1910 novel At the Villa Rose set in the south of France. He appeared in a further four novels and a novella. His last appearance was in the 1946 novel The House in Lordship Lane. Hanaud has been portrayed on screen several times – with adaptations of At the Villa Rose and The House of the Arrow.

He has been seen as one of a number of influences on the creation of Agatha Christie's Belgian detective Hercule Poirot.

== Hanaud works ==
- At the Villa Rose (1910)
- The Affair at the Semiramis Hotel (1917) (novella)
- The House of the Arrow (1924)
- The Prisoner in the Opal (1928)
- They Wouldn't Be Chessmen (1934)
- "The Ginger King" (1940) (Short Story)
- The House in Lordship Lane (1946)
- Inspector Hanaud's Investigations (1931) (omnibus volume of first three novels)

== Adaptations ==
Film

- At the Villa Rose (1920) starring Teddy Arundell
- At the Villa Rose (1930) starring Austin Trevor
- Le mystère de la villa rose [The Mystery of the Villa Rose] (1930)
- The House of the Arrow (1930) starring Dennis Neilson-Terry
- La Maison de la Fléche [The House of the Arrow] (1930)
- At the Villa Rose (1940) starring Kenneth Kent
- The House of the Arrow (1940) starring Kenneth Kent
- The House of the Arrow (1953) starring Oskar Homolka

Television

- At the Villa Rose (1948) starring Anthony Holles

BBC Radio

- At the Villa Rose (1947) starring Francis L. Sullivan
- The House of the Arrow (1984) starring Richard Pasco
- At the Villa Rose (1999) starring Andrew Sachs

== Bibliography ==
- Green, Roger Lancelyn (1952). A. E. W. Mason. London: Max Parrish.
- Bargainnier, Earl F. Twelve Englishmen of mystery. Bowling Green University Popular Press, 1984.
- Pitts, Michael R. Famous Movie Detectives III. Scarecrow Press, 2004
- Queen, Ellery Queen's Quorum: a History of the Detective-Crime Short Story. New York, 1969.
