= The House in Lordship Lane =

1946 detective novel by A.E.W. Mason

- First edition (UK)
- Author: A. E. W. Mason
- Language: English
- Series: Inspector Hanaud
- Genre: Detective fiction
- Set in: England, Egypt
- Publisher: Hodder and Stoughton; Dodd, Mead (US)
- Publication date: 1946
- Pages: 320
- Preceded by: They Wouldn't Be Chessmen

The House in Lordship Lane is a 1946 British detective novel by A.E.W. Mason. It is the fifth and final full-length novel in Mason's Inspector Hanaud series, published when the author was eighty-one. Unlike the others in the series the story is largely set in England, the Lordship Lane of the title being a thoroughfare in East Dulwich, South London.

== Plot ==
Julius Ricardo is holidaying in Lézardrieux, France, when he is informed by telegram of an unexpected visit to London by his friend Inspector Hanaud. He hitches a lift home across the Channel on the yacht Agamemnon, owned by Philip Mordaunt, an acquaintance who happens to be in the area. In a storm en route, Agamemnon narrowly avoids colliding with the prison steamship El Rey, heading for Gravesend to repatriate some British 'undesirables' previously held in a Venezuelan prison. Hearing a cry from the water, they pick up an escapee, Bryan Devisher. Devisher had found himself caught up in a Venezuelan revolution while handling stolen goods for Daniel Horbury, a shady London MP – and he now holds a grudge. As Devisher has been left with nothing, Mordaunt gives him a letter of introduction to Septimus Crottle, owner of the Dagger shipping line. Crottle is a controlling patriarch who runs his business with a rod of iron, allowing very little autonomy to his two nephews, George and James Crottle.

When Horbury is found dead with his throat cut at his home in Lordship Lane, Hanaud and Ricardo assist Superintendent Maltby of Scotland Yard with the investigation. Devisher has disappeared without trace, and he initially seems the obvious suspect but Hanaud suspects that Olivia Horbury, Daniel's wife, may not be telling the truth about what happened on the night of his death.

Mordaunt takes a job as a drugs officer with the Egyptian Coastguard and is astonished to run into Devisher in a small village near Cairo. Devisher claims to be working for the Dagger Line, but he appears be involved in drug running, and Mordaunt cannot understand how such a hands-on owner as Septimus Crottle could possibly have put an ex-convict into the company's commercially important Cairo office. When Mordaunt says that he must write to thank Septimus, Devisher shows real fear.

Septimus Crottle is kidnapped and held in solitary confinement for several weeks, during which time George and James take over the business. Hanaud discovers where Septimus has been held. Searching the nephews' office, he finds evidence that George has been using Dagger Line ships to facilitate drug running, and that it was he rather than Septimus who had found a post for Devisher in Cairo. When Superintendent Maltby not only accuses George of kidnap but also arrests him for the murder of Daniel Horbury, Ricardo is perplexed. George commits suicide before he can be questioned, but leaves a full written confession.

George recounts that he was being blackmailed by Daniel Horbury, who had found out about his drug running activities. When Horbury discovered that Devisher was back in England and likely to seek revenge, he summoned George to Lordship Lane to make a proposal: in return for George packing Devisher off somewhere far away in one of his ships, Horbury would return the incriminating evidence he held. But unknown to both, Devisher was at that moment prowling around outside in the dark. When Devisher entered through the French windows, George threw a heavy long-bladed knife at Horbury, catching him on the throat and killing him outright. Devisher panicked and left the scene.

Realising that Devisher could hardly escape conviction for the murder, and unable to accuse George for fear of her husband's blackmailing activities becoming public, Olivia Horbury reluctantly agreed to testify that her husband had been killed while she was sleeping upstairs. Finding Devisher still nearby shortly afterwards, George finds him more than eager to accept a free passage to Cairo on one of his ships.

== Principal characters ==
- Inspector Gabriel Hanaud of the Paris Sûreté
- Julius Ricardo, old friend of Hanaud
- Superintendent Maltby of Scotland Yard
- Philip Mordaunt, owner of the ketch Agamemnon
- Septimus Crottle, family patriarch and owner of the Dagger shipping line
- George Crottle, nephew of Septimus
- James Crottle, nephew of Septimus
- Bryan Devisher, escapee from the prison ship El Rey
- Daniel Horbury, Member of Parliament and blackmailer
- Olivia Horbury, wife of Daniel

== Critical reception ==
Writing in 1952, Mason's biographer Roger Lancelyn Green considered that interest flags in the second half of the novel, though he felt the first half to be as good as any of the earlier Hanaud books. In 1984, another critic noted little sign of the author mellowing, with the novel uncovering as many dark corners as had the others.

== Bibliography ==
- Green, Roger Lancelyn (1952). A. E. W. Mason. London: Max Parrish.
- Hayne, Barrie (1984). "A. E. W. Mason". In Bargainnier, Earl F. (ed.). Twelve Englishmen of Mystery. Bowling Green, Ohio: Bowling Green University popular Press. ISBN 0-87972-250-9.
