= Fire Over England (novel) =

1936 novel by A.E.W. Mason

- First edition
- Author: A. E. W. Mason
- Cover artist: Bip Pares
- Language: English
- Genre: Adventure fiction
- Publisher: Hodder & Stoughton
- Publication date: 1936
- Publication place: England
- Media type: Print

Fire Over England is a 1936 English adventure novel by A. E. W. Mason. The story is set during the late 16th century and concerns the English response to the threat of the Spanish Armada of 1588; it is an obvious analogy to the international situation of Britain during 1936, a fact noted explicitly by Mason in his Preface to the first edition.

The story begins in 1581 when the hero Robin Aubrey is at Eton; a few years previously, his father George was arrested for the possession of 'heretical literature' while travelling in Spain and supposedly executed. Robin becomes obsessed with avenging his father by funding a private naval expedition to destroy the Spanish treasure convoy, an ambition he is careful to hide from others. Just before departure, he attends a house party at the home of the Bannets, his scheming Catholic neighbours where he meets the beautiful Cynthia Norris and they fall in love.

A number of historical figures appear in the novel, including Francis Walsingham who summons Robin to a meeting and reveals that George is still alive. He asks Robin to spy for him in Spain instead of going on the expedition, with the incentive being that he can then rescue his father. The rest of the story concerns Robin's adventures on that mission, ending with him making his way home on board the Armada itself.

Mason strives to be fair in his treatment of the various personalities, including Phillip of Spain and Santa Cruz; the purpose was to show there were men of goodwill on all sides. In another parallel with the political divisions of the 1930s, the treacherous Bannets are described as a tiny minority, with the vast majority of Englishmen ignoring their religious differences to unite against a common foe.

== Adaptation ==
In 1937, less than a year after publication, the novel was adapted as a movie Fire Over England featuring Laurence Olivier, with Vivien Leigh and Flora Robson.
