= Alfredo Campoli =

British violinist (1906–1991)

Alfredo Campoli (20 October 1906 – 27 March 1991) was an Italian-born British violinist, often known simply as Campoli. He was noted for the beauty of the tone he produced from the violin. Campoli spent most of his childhood and much of his career in England.

== Biography ==
Campoli was born in Rome in 1906 where his father was leader of the orchestra at the Accademia di Santa Cecilia, taught the violin and was Alfredo’s first teacher. His mother was a dramatic soprano who had toured with Scotti and Caruso, but a retired performer at the time of Campoli's birth. His family moved to England in 1911, and 5 years later Campoli was already giving public concerts.

In 1919, he entered the London Music Festival and won the gold medal for his performance of the Mendelssohn's Violin Concerto. Campoli made his professional debut in a recital at the Wigmore Hall in 1923. He toured with such singers as Dame Nellie Melba and Dame Clara Butt, and played with the Reginald King Orchestra (and as a member of King's Celebrity Trio).

Although he appeared in the standard repertoire with symphony orchestras, during the depression there was little demand for a soloist and Campoli formed his Salon Orchestra and the Welbeck Light Quartet playing at restaurants in London, and other such venues. He appeared at a Prom concert in 1938. During World War II he gave numerous concerts for Allied troops. After the war, he had extended tours of Europe, Southeast Asia, New Zealand, and Australia, and continued his work with the BBC, eventually achieving over 1,000 radio broadcasts.

He made his American debut in 1953, playing Lalo's Symphonie espagnole with the New York Philharmonic under George Szell. In 1955 he gave the first performance of Sir Arthur Bliss's Violin Concerto, which was written for him. In 1956 he twice toured the Soviet Union.

Campoli owned two Stradivarius violins, the Baillot-Pommerau of 1694 and the Dragonetti of 1700 (see also List of Stradivarius instruments). However, it was his 1843 Rocca that he used predominantly, the Dragonetti being housed in the bank for security.

He considered the phrasing of each passage he played and if he could achieve ‘bel canto’ by shortening or lengthening a note then he would do so. He was not afraid to lift the bow from the strings, an act that seems to be completely avoided today. Brief breaks of sound can add tremendous drama and power to a performance, even when not indicated by the composer.

Campoli's recorded legacy was enormous, including a renowned recording of Elgar's Violin Concerto in B minor. Previously unpublished recordings, including material recorded at Campoli's home, are referred to on Brightcecilia Classical Music Forums. There is a compact disc of a recording of Vivaldi's The Four Seasons made by him taken from acetates of a French radio broadcast; these are thought to date from early in 1939, predating the first electrical recordings of the work.

At the beginning of the 1960s, Campoli was living in Southgate, London. In 1961, a private recording of him playing the Beethoven concerto with the Hayes Orchestra (Bromley, Kent) was made by his friend Geoffrey Terry. There is also a recording by Terry of Campoli in rehearsal with British pianist Peter Katin (with whom he had earlier formed a duo), Daphne Ibbott and Valerie Tryon. Terry promoted and recorded Campoli's last Queen Elizabeth Hall recital, and a 1963 recital of Mozart and Beethoven by Campoli and Katin at Croydon. Two sonatas from that recital had been released together with a Brahms sonata, recorded 1973 by the same duo in Alfredo Campoli’s Southgate home.

In 2021, the Barbirolli Society released a live recording of the Sibelius Concerto with the Halle Orchestra conducted by Sir John Barbirolli, coupled with the Elgar Cello Concerto played by Jacqueline du Pre, in a 2-disc set, the Sibelius on audio CD and also DVD, from a BBC Broadcast of 1964.

Campoli appeared in a number of films and was a guest on the BBC radio programme Desert Island Discs on 21 August 1953.

Campoli was a keen bridge player, and died just before a game at the Bridge Club in Princes Risborough, Buckinghamshire, a few miles from his home in Thame, Oxfordshire. His archives are kept at Cambridge University Library.

A blue plaque dedicated to him was unveiled at 39 North Street, his home in Thame, 14 April 2011.
