= The House of the Arrow (novel) =

1924 mystery novel by A.E.W. Mason

- First edition (UK)
- Author: A. E. W. Mason
- Language: English
- Series: Inspector Hanaud
- Genre: Detective fiction
- Publisher: Hodder & Stoughton (UK); George H. Doran (US)
- Publication date: 1924
- Publication place: England and France
- Media type: Print
- Pages: 320 (UK)
- Preceded by: The Affair at the Semiramis Hotel
- Followed by: The Prisoner in the Opal

The House of the Arrow is a 1924 mystery novel by the English novelist A. E. W. Mason, the third full-length novel featuring his recurring character Inspector Hanaud. It has inspired several films of the same title.

== Plot ==
After the death of Simon Harlowe, a wealthy art collector, his widow has continued to live in Dijon, latterly with her niece Betty and Betty's paid companion Ann Upcott. When Mrs Harlowe herself dies, her English solicitors receive a blackmailing letter from her brother-in-law Boris Waberski. He accuses Betty of poisoning Mrs Harlowe, and junior partner Jim Frobisher is dispatched to Dijon to provide legal advice.

Waberski claims that Betty had bought poison from a shady herbalist, Jean Cladel, but is unable to make good his murder accusation. Mrs Harlowe's body shows no trace of poison, and it appears that she may have died of natural causes. But Inspector Hanaud is suspicious when on searching the house he finds in Ann's room a monograph describing Strophanthus Hispidus, a plant from which an undetectable arrow poison can be extracted. The book includes a plate of an actual arrow smeared with poison and an author's note thanking Simon Harlowe for lending it for research purposes. Although the house contains many treasures collected by Simon Harlowe, there is no sign of the arrow. Hanaud believes it to be in a suite of rooms that has been sealed by the police – Mrs Harlowe's downstairs bedroom and an interconnected "treasure room" used as Betty's sitting room.

Betty says that on the night of Mrs Harlowe's death Waberski had been away for a few days. She had seen Mrs Harlowe shortly before leaving the house at 8:55pm to go to a dance, returning at exactly 1:20am (the time being noted by the chauffeur) and going straight to bed. She was woken by her maid Francine Rollard at 7:00 and told of the death.

Ann says that she had fallen asleep in her chair, and had woken up after dark. Needing to check an address for a letter, she had gone downstairs to Betty's sitting room. Entering, she had flicked the light on and then quickly off again when she saw to her surprise that the interconnecting door leading to the bedroom, which was always locked, stood open. Through it she could hear voices and sounds that she interpreted as someone trying to sedate an intoxicated Mrs Harlowe. During the split-second that the light was on, she noted the clock on the opposite wall: it showed 10:30. Not wanting to intrude, she returned to her own room.

When the door seals are removed, Hanault is able to search the treasure room and bedroom. The clock is found to be accurate to the minute, but the arrow is not there. Jim stumbles across it later in Ann's room, converted to a pen.

Following up Waberski's story, Hanaud and Jim track the herbalist Jean Cladel down to a seedy part of town. But they are just too late: he has been stabbed to death.

When Ann receives an anonymous letter bidding her attend a ball where she will learn the truth about Mrs Harlowe's death, Betty encourages her to go. Ann is kidnapped, bound, and taken to an empty house nearby where she is confronted with the murderers: Betty and her maid Francine. As Betty approaches Ann with a hypodermic syringe of arrow poison, Hanaud steps out from his hiding place. He had suspected Betty for some time, he later tells Jim, but unable to prove her guilt had allowed the kidnapping to go ahead to secure hard evidence.

The key to the mystery had been Hanaud's realisation that Betty continued to have access to the treasure room, in spite of the sealed doors, via a secret passage running from an old sedan chair in the room to the nearby empty house. The murder, which had indeed been heard by Ann, took place after Betty's return, at 1:30am. The clock which had apparently read 10:30 was showing the correct time, but had been seen in a mirror. Betty took advantage of the mistake, and before the room was unsealed she moved the clock so that it stood in direct line of sight opposite the door. The arrow had been in the room, but after Hanaud had drawn attention to the monograph Betty had re-hidden it to implicate Ann.

== Principal characters ==
- Mrs Harlowe (née Jeanne-Marie Raviart), a wealthy widow
- Betty Harlowe, Mrs Harlowe's niece
- Boris Waberski, Mrs Harlowe's brother-in-law
- Ann Upcott, companion to Betty Harlowe
- Francine Rollard, maid to Betty Harlowe
- Jean Cladel, a herbalist
- Monsieur Bex, local notary to Mrs Harlowe and Betty
- Jim Frobisher, English solicitor to Mrs Harlowe and Betty
- Inspector Hanaud of the Paris Sûreté

== Background ==
According to the author himself, the book was inspired by the case of a Russian man who had accused his young niece of murdering her mother, and had attempted blackmail. Mason had said to himself: "Suppose that after all the accusation was true, but the blackmailing uncle [...] didn't know that it was true!"

Mason had learned of the properties of Strophanthus Hispidus from W. E. Dixon, a professor of medicine with whom he had served as a Secret Service agent in the Mediterranean in 1915. On seeking further information he received the treatise on the poison with its diagrams, "and with it the poison-arrow with the reddish clay in which the poison is mixed still clinging to the barb."

One of Mason's difficulties in framing the story had resolved itself as he was sitting outside smoking a pipe one night after working late. Looking back into the house through the French windows he saw that the hands of the clock pointed to half-past ten, which was quite wrong. He then realised that the clock was invisible from where he sat, and that he was looking into a mirror.

== Critical reception ==
Writing in 1952, Mason's biographer Roger Lancelyn Green praised the book as "a detective novel perfect in every detail", in which Hanaud emerged "ready to take his place among the great detectives".

In A Catalogue of Crime (1989) Barzun and Taylor called the novel a "milepost in detective fiction". They praised the book for its romance, melodrama, good characterisation and humour, but suggested that these things could not compensate for Hanaud's failure to play fair with his Watson [Frobisher].

== Adaptations ==
At the request of the theatre manager and actor Arthur Bouchier the novel was adapted for the stage in 1926 by Mason himself. It has also been adapted for the screen four times:

- La Maison de la Fléche (France) (1930)
- The House of the Arrow (UK) (1930)
- The House of the Arrow (UK) (1940)
- The House of the Arrow (UK) (1953)

== Bibliography ==
- Green, Roger Lancelyn (1952). A. E. W. Mason. London: Max Parrish.
- Barzun, Jacques; Taylor, Wendall Hertig (1989). A Catalogue of Crime (2nd ed.). New York: Harper & Row. ISBN 0-06-015796-8.
