= Mr. Reeder in Room 13 =

1938 film

- American poster
- Directed by: Norman Lee
- Written by: Victor Kendall; Elizabeth Meehan; Doreen Montgomery
- Based on: novel Room 13 by Edgar Wallace
- Produced by: John Corfield
- Starring: Peter Murray-Hill; Sally Gray; Gibb McLaughlin
- Cinematography: Eric Cross
- Edited by: Ted Richards (as Edward Richards)
- Music by: Ronnie Munro
- Production company: British National Films
- Distributed by: Associated British Film Distributors (UK)
- Release date: February 1938 (UK)
- Running time: 78 minutes
- Country: United Kingdom
- Language: English

Mr. Reeder in Room 13 is a 1938 British crime film directed by Norman Lee and starring Peter Murray-Hill, Sally Gray and Gibb McLaughlin. It is based on the first J. G. Reeder book, Room 13 by Edgar Wallace. The film was released in the U.S. in 1941 as Mystery of Room 13.

== Plot ==
Mr. J. G. Reeder is called in by the Bank of England to investigate a gang of forgers. Reeder enlists the aid of a younger man, Captain Johnnie Gray, to infiltrate the gang by going undercover in Dartmoor jail.

== Cast ==
- Peter Murray-Hill as Captain Johnnie Gray
- Sally Gray as Claire Kane
- Gibb McLaughlin as J.G. Reeder
- Malcolm Keen as Peter Kane
- Leslie Perrins as Jeffrey Legge
- Sara Seegar as Lila Legge
- D.J. Williams as Emmanuel Legge
- Rex Carvel as Sir John Flaherty
- Robert Cochran as Detective Inspector Barker
- Phil Ray as Fenner, convict

== Critical reception ==
The Monthly Film Bulletin wrote: "The plot has vigour but it is clumsy, slovenly and frankly impossible. ... But the film has many merits; it moves quickly, in general is very well acted, has really humorous interludes, and good clear sound and photography."

Kine Weekly wrote: "The acting is in the main good, and powerful suspense accompanies the climax, but the story is far from easy to follow. There is, however plenty of active and exciting surface interest to keep the masses on tenterhooks."

Picturegoer wrote: "The plot is very involved in this adaptation of an Edgar Wallace thriller and militates against the picture's entertainment. ... Sally Gray is adequate as the heroine and Gibb McLaughlin is good in the title role, but the rest of the cast is hindered by the story development."

The Daily Film Renter wrote: "Typical Wallace thriller, plot packs robust hokum for 'meller' fans. Finale takes form of exciting battle between police and lawless element. Acting and presentation on suitably hearty lines, and film can safely be recommended as punch entertainment for masses, with author's name as ace draw."

== See also ==
- Room 13 (1964)
- The Mind of Mr. J.G. Reeder (1969–71)
