= The Mind of Mr. J.G. Reeder =

British TV series (1969–1971)

- Genre: Crime drama
- Starring: Hugh Burden; Willoughby Goddard
- Country of origin: United Kingdom
- Original language: English
- No. of series: 2
- No. of episodes: 16

Production
- Production company: Thames Television

Original release
- Network: ITV
- Release: 23 April 1969 – 7 June 1971

The Mind of Mr. J.G. Reeder is a British television series which was originally broadcast on ITV in two series from 1969 to 1971. It is based on a series of novels and short stories written by Edgar Wallace featuring the character of J.G. Reeder, who had appeared in several film adaptations in the late 1930s. Sixteen episodes were made, all but two in black-and-white.

Reeder is a mild-mannered employee at the Department of Public Prosecutions with an extraordinary gift for solving complex crimes. He is played by Hugh Burden, working under the overbearing Sir Jason Toovey (Willoughby Goddard). It is set in the 1920s, when the stories were originally written, and the graphics of the opening credits reflect this Jazz Age setting.

The series has been released in Region 2 DVD.

== Cast ==
=== Main ===
- Hugh Burden as Mr. J.G. Reeder
- Willoughby Goddard as Sir Jason Toovey
- Mona Bruce as Mrs. Houchin
- Gillian Lewis as Miss Belman
- Virginia Stride as Margaret Belman
- Windsor Davies as Chief Inspector Pyne
- Mark Dignam as Lord Nettlefold
- Geoffrey Lumsden as Lord Rothbard
- Alison McMurdo as Miss Pangbourne
- Harry Towb as Lew Kassio
- David Steuart as judge
- Amanda Barrie as Ethel Gibson

=== Guests ===
- Petronella Barker as Miss Trottington-Fox
- Madeline Smith as Miss Clutterbuck
- Hildegarde Neil as Marylou Plessy
- Michael Bates as Ras Lal Punjabi
- Dino Shafeek as Second Priest
- Mark Edwards
- Victor Woolf
- Jennifer Wilson

== See also ==
- Mr. Reeder in Room 13 (1938)
- Room 13 (1964)
