= The Mystery of the Villa Rose =

1930 French film

- Directed by: René Hervil; Louis Mercanton
- Written by: A.E.W. Mason (novel); Louis d'Yvré; Pierre Maudru; Cyril Twyford
- Produced by: Jacques Haïk
- Starring: Léon Mathot; Simone Vaudry; Louis Baron fils
- Cinematography: Basil Emmott
- Production company: Les Établissements Jacques Haïk
- Distributed by: Les Établissements Jacques Haïk
- Release date: 17 January 1930
- Running time: 100 minutes
- Country: France
- Language: French

The Mystery of the Villa Rose (French: Le mystère de la villa rose) is a 1930 French mystery film directed by René Hervil and Louis Mercanton and starring Léon Mathot, Simone Vaudry, and Louis Baron fils.

== Production ==
The film is based on the 1910 novel At the Villa Rose by A.E.W. Mason. A separate English-language version At the Villa Rose was made by Twickenham Studios. The film's sets were designed by James A. Carter. Different sources disagree over where the French-language version was actually made, with one claim that it was produced at Twickenham as the first bilingual film in Britain. Alternatively it is suggested that it was made at the newly established Courbevoie Studios in Paris, in which case it could lay a claim to be one of the earliest French sound films. Britain had converted to sound faster than France so several French filmmakers went to British studios to make films for release in France. Another French-language version of a Mason novel La Maison de la Fléche, was also shot at Twickenham during the period.

== Cast ==
- Léon Mathot as Langeac
- Simone Vaudry as Mado Dubreuil
- Louis Baron fils as Le Maillan
- Héléna Manson as Hélène Vauquier
- Georges Péclet as Mortagne
- Alice Ael as Madame Dauvray
- Jacques Henley as Le juge d'instruction
- Dahlia as L'inconnue
- Jean Mercanton as Le petit garçon
- René Montis as Le chauffeur

== Bibliography ==
- Crisp, C.G. The Classic French Cinema, 1930-1960. Indiana University Press, 1993.
