= Room 13 (Wallace novel) =

1924 novel

- Author: Edgar Wallace
- Language: English
- Genre: Crime
- Publication date: 1924
- Publication place: United Kingdom
- Media type: Print
- Pages: 146
- ISBN: 1541195523

Room 13 is a 1924 crime novel by the British writer Edgar Wallace. It was the first in a series of books featuring the character of J. G. Reeder, a mild-mannered civil servant who is a brilliant detective.

== Film adaptations ==
In 1938 it was turned into the British film Mr. Reeder in Room 13 directed by Norman Lee and starring Peter Murray-Hill, Sally Gray and Gibb McLaughlin as J. G Reeder.

In 1964 it was turned into a West German thriller Room 13 directed by Harald Reinl and starring Joachim Fuchsberger and Karin Dor. This was part of a long-running series of Wallace adaptations made by Rialto Film.
