= Between Night and Dawn =

1931 film

- Theatrical film poster
- German: Zwischen Nacht und Morgen
- Directed by: Gerhard Lamprecht
- Written by: Herbert Juttke
- Based on: Dirnentragödie (play) by Wilhem Braun
- Produced by: August Mueller
- Starring: Aud Egede-Nissen; Oskar Homolka; Eduard von Winterstein
- Cinematography: Karl Hasselmann
- Music by: Giuseppe Becce
- Production company: Biograph-Film
- Distributed by: Biograph-Film
- Release date: 11 August 1931
- Running time: 79 minutes
- Country: Germany
- Language: German

Between Night and Dawn (German: Zwischen Nacht und Morgen) is a 1931 German drama film directed by Gerhard Lamprecht and starring Aud Egede-Nissen, Oskar Homolka, and Eduard von Winterstein. The film's sets were designed by the art director, Otto Moldenhauer. It is a remake of the 1927 silent film, Tragedy of the Street, starring Asta Nielsen. It was originally intended that she should reprise her role for the sound remake, but ultimately Norwegian actress Aud Egede-Nissen was cast in the role. The film premiered at the Gloria-Palast in Berlin.

== Cast ==
- Aud Egede-Nissen as Emma, the prostitute
- Oskar Homolka as Anton, her pimp
- Dorit Ina as Clarissa, the chanson singer
- Rolf von Goth as Paul, young man
- Eduard von Winterstein as father
- Olga Limburg as mother
- Bernhard Goetzke as Louis, pimp
- Gerhard Dammann as Ede, a crook
- Maria Forescu as Anita
- Hilde Schevior as Fritzi
- Ilse Baerwald as Lissi
- Rudolf Biebrach as the host of the Bimbam
- Ernst Behmer as the fur trader
- Eugen Rex as Der Wurstmaxe
- Edit Angold as female concierge

== See also ==
- Tragedy of the Street (1927)
