= Oscar Homolka =

Austrian actor (1898–1978)

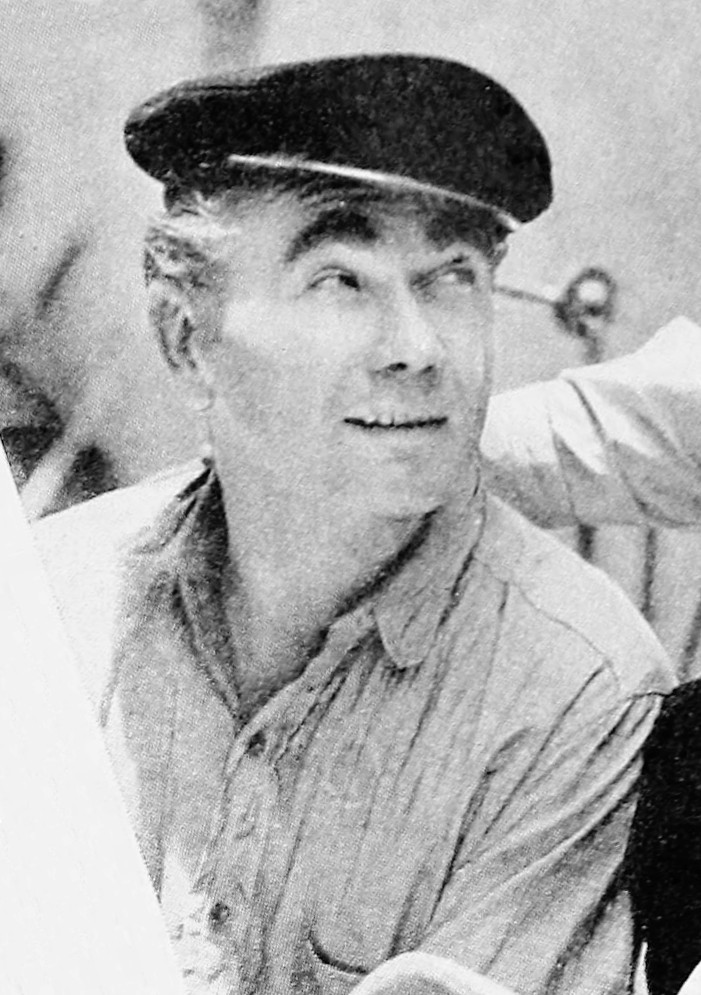
- Homolka in Ebb Tide (1937)
- Born: 12 August 1898; Vienna, Austria-Hungary
- Died: 27 January 1978 (aged 79); Tunbridge Wells, Kent, England
- Occupation: Actor
- Years active: 1926–1976
- Spouses: Grete Mosheim (m. 1928; div. 1937) Baroness Vally Hatvany (m. 1937; died 1938) Florence Meyer (m. 1939; div. 1948) Joan Tetzel (m. 1949; died 1977)
- Children: 2

Oscar Homolka (12 August 1898 – 27 January 1978) was an Austrian film and theatre actor, who went on to work in Germany, Britain and the United States. Both his voice and his appearance fitted him for roles as communist spies or Soviet officials, for which he was in regular demand. By the age of 30, he had appeared in more than 400 plays; his film career covered at least 100 films and TV shows.

He was nominated for the Academy Award for Best Supporting Actor for his performance in I Remember Mama (1948).

== Career ==
Homolka served in the Austro-Hungarian Army during the First World War. Sent to Italy as a lieutenant, he was wounded three times, and when the armistice occurred he was in a hospital.

After his military service ended, Homolka attended the Imperial Academy of Music and the Performing Arts in Vienna, the city of his birth, and began his career on the Austrian stage. In 1924 he played Mortimer in the premiere of Brecht's play The Life of Edward II of England at the Munich Kammerspiele, and from 1925 in Berlin where he worked under Max Reinhardt.

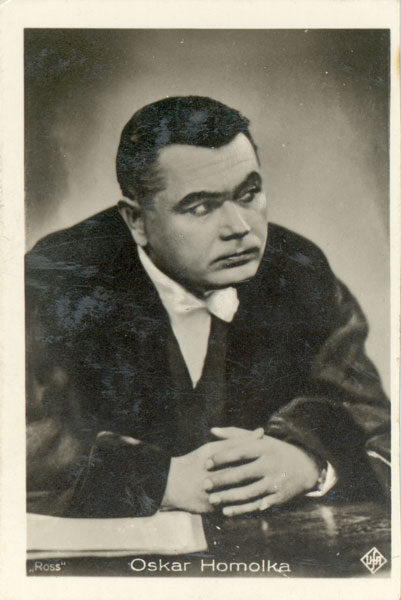
Oscar Homolka in 1932

Other stage plays in which Homolka performed during this period include: The first German performance of Eugene O'Neill's The Emperor Jones, 1924, Anna Christie, 1924, Boubouroche, 1925, Juarez and Maximilian, 1925–1926, Her Young Boyfriend, 1925, The Jewish Widow, 1925, Stir, 1925, Mérimée and Courteline, 1926, Periphery, 1926, Neidhardt von Gneisenau, 1926, Dorothea Angermann, 1926–1927, Der Revisor, 1926, Androcles and the Lion, 1926, Bonaparte, 1927, The Ringer and The Squeaker by Edgar Wallace, both 1927, Underworld, 1930, Today's Sensation, 1931, The Last Equipage, 1931, The Waterloo Bridge, 1931, Faust, 1932, Karl and Anna, Doctor's Dilemma, Pygmalion, Juno and the Paycock, and many Shakespearean plays including: A Midsummer Night's Dream, 1925, Troilus and Cressida, 1927, Richard III, King Lear, and Macbeth. After his arrival in London, he continued to star on stage, including with Flora Robson in the play Close Quarters.

His first films were Die Abenteuer eines Zehnmarkscheines (Uneasy Money, 1926), Hokuspokus (Hocuspocus, 1930), and Dreyfus (The Dreyfus Case, 1930), Zwischen Nacht und Morgen (Between Night and Dawn, 1931), Geheimdienst (Intelligence, 1931), Junge Liebe (Young Love, 1931), and Nachtkolonne (Night Column, 1932). According to Homolka's own account, he made at least thirty silent films in Germany and starred in the first talking picture ever made there.

After the Nazi party came to power in Germany, Homolka moved to Britain, where he starred in the films Rhodes of Africa, with Walter Huston (1936) and Everything Is Thunder, with Constance Bennett (1936). Later, he was one of the many Austrian and specifically Viennese actors and theatrical people who left Europe for the US.

Homolka's Broadway debut came in Grey Farm (1940).

In 1936, he appeared opposite Sylvia Sidney in Alfred Hitchcock's thriller Sabotage. Although he often played villains such as Communist spies and Soviet-bloc military officers or scientists, he was nominated for an Academy Award for Best Supporting Actor for his portrayal of the crusty, beloved uncle in I Remember Mama (1948).

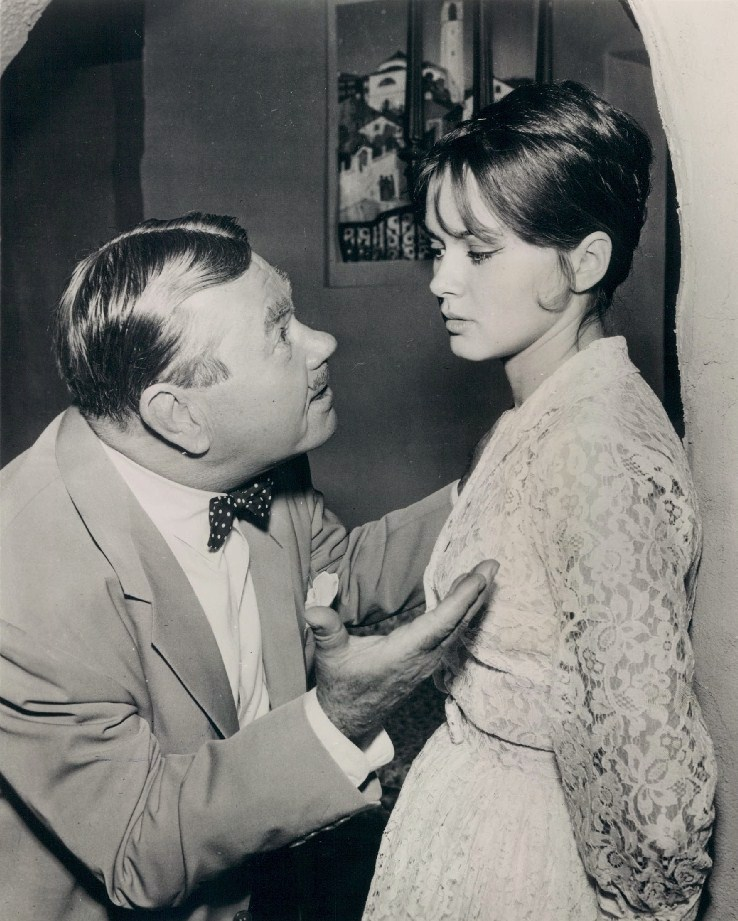
Oscar Homolka and Danielle De Metz in "The Ikon of Elijah", an episode of Alfred Hitchcock Presents (1960)

He also acted with Ingrid Bergman in Rage in Heaven, with Marilyn Monroe in The Seven Year Itch, with Ronald Reagan in Prisoner of War and with Katharine Hepburn in The Madwoman of Chaillot. He returned to England in the mid-1960s, to play the Soviet KGB Colonel Stok in Funeral in Berlin (1966) and Billion Dollar Brain (1967), opposite Michael Caine. His last film was the Blake Edwards romantic drama The Tamarind Seed in 1974.

In 1967 Homolka was awarded the Filmband in Gold of the Deutscher Filmpreis for outstanding contributions to German cinema.

His career in television included appearances in three episodes of Alfred Hitchcock Presents in 1957 and 1960, and a 1964 episode of Hazel. In 1973, he appeared in "Border Line", an episode of The Protectors, filmed in Austria.

Homolka was referenced in the 1970s TV series The Odd Couple. When Oscar Madison makes his desperate last call to find a date and his prospect does not recall him, Madison asks "How many Oscars do you know?" After a pregnant pause, Madison replies, "You know Oscar Homolka?"

== Personal life ==
Homolka became an American citizen on December 25, 1942. He married four times:

- His first wife was Grete Mosheim, a German actress. They married in Berlin on 28 June 1928 but divorced in 1937. She later married Howard Gould.
- His second wife, Baroness Vally Hatvany was a Hungarian actress. They married in December 1937, but she died on April 5, 1938.
- On August 21, 1939, Homolka married socialite and photographer Florence Meyer (1911–1962), a daughter of The Washington Post owner Eugene Meyer in Mount Kisco, New York. They had two sons, Vincent and Laurence, but divorced after nine years of marriage.
- His last wife was actress Joan Tetzel, whom he married in 1949. The marriage lasted until Tetzel's death in 1977.

== Death ==
Homolka made his home in Britain after 1966. He died of pneumonia in Tunbridge Wells, Kent, on 27 January 1978, three months after the death of his fourth wife, actress Joan Tetzel. He was 79 years old. He and Tetzel are buried in Christ Church churchyard, Fairwarp, East Sussex, England. Their gravestone is notable for having a pair of theatrical masks carved into the surface.

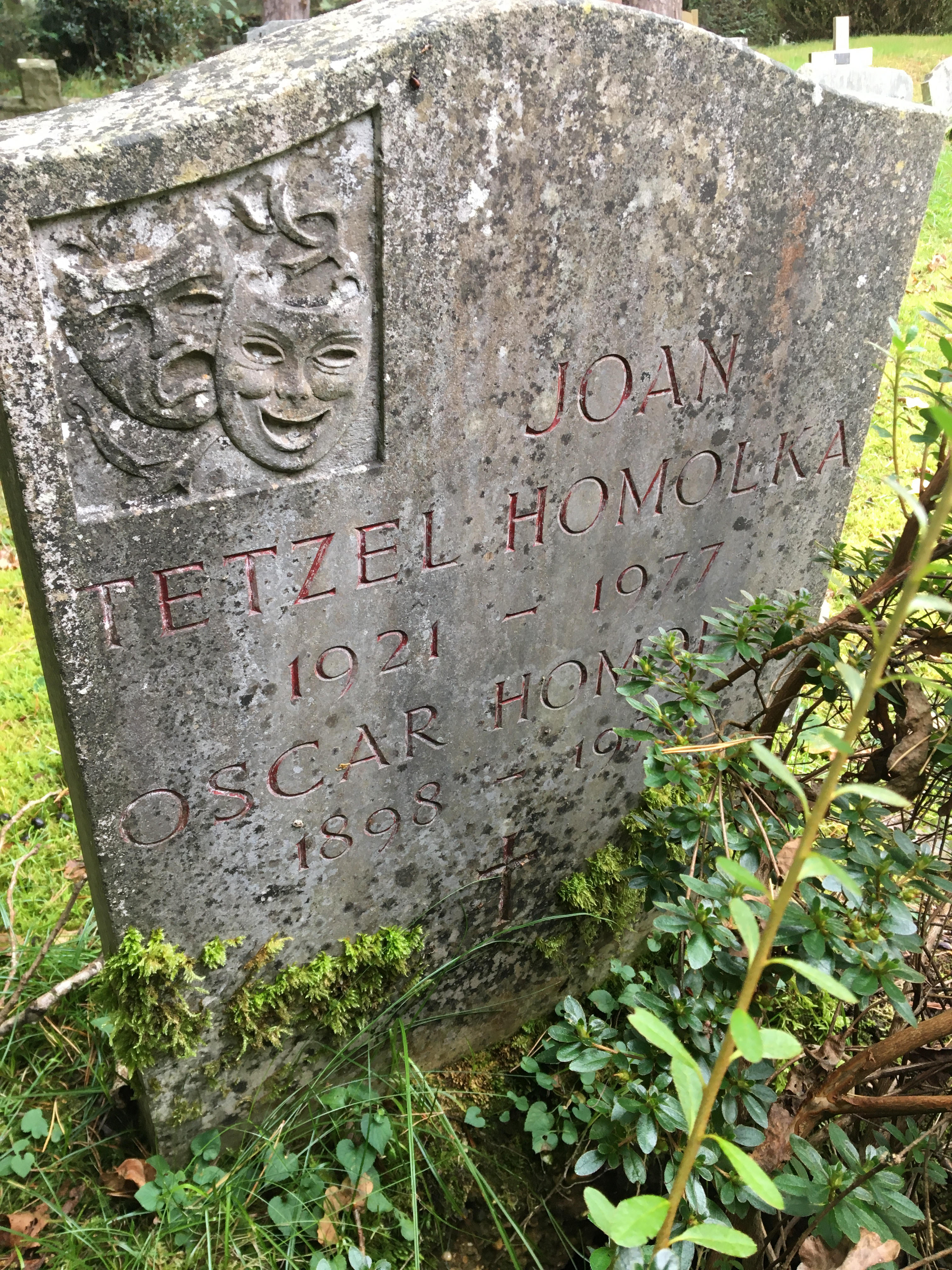
The grave of actor Oscar Homolka and his wife in Christ Church, Fairwarp, East Sussex

== Filmography ==
| Year | Title | Role | Notes |
|---|---|---|---|
| 1926 | Adventures of a Ten Mark Note | Direktor Haniel | lost film |
| 1927 | Aftermath | Der Matrose | |
| 1927 | Tragedy of the Street | Anton | |
| 1927 | The Girl Without a Homeland | Plempe | |
| 1927 | Regine, die Tragödie einer Frau | Robert, ihr Bruder | |
| 1927 | The Holy Lie | Jack | |
| 1927 | The Trial of Donald Westhof | Lessing | |
| 1927 | Petronella – Das Geheimnis der Berge | Fridolin Bortis | |
| 1928 | Prince or Clown | Zurube | |
| 1928 | The Serfs | Gouverneur Fürst Kurganow | |
| 1928 | The Prince of Rogues | Antmann | |
| 1928 | The Green Alley | Doctor Horner | |
| 1930 | Revolt in the Reformatory | Erzieher | |
| 1930 | Masks | Breitkopf | |
| 1930 | Hocuspocus | Grandt | |
| 1930 | Dreyfus | Major Walsin-Esterhazy | |
| 1931 | Road to Rio | Ricardo | |
| 1931 | 1914 | Sazanow | |
| 1931 | Between Night and Dawn | Anton | |
| 1931 | In the Employ of the Secret Service | Lanskoi, generalmajor | |
| 1932 | Night Convoy | André Carno | |
| 1932 | Nights in Port Said | Winston Winkler | |
| 1933 | Moral und Liebe | Robert Keßler | |
| 1933 | Spies at Work | Blünzli (Agent B 18) | |
| 1933 | Invisible Opponent | James Godfrey | |
| 1936 | Rhodes of Africa | Paul Kruger | |
| 1936 | Everything Is Thunder | Detective Schenck Götz | |
| 1936 | Sabotage | Karl Anton Verloc | |
| 1937 | Ebb Tide | Captain Jakob Therbecke | |
| 1940 | Seven Sinners | Antro | |
| 1940 | Comrade X | Commissar Vasiliev | |
| 1940 | The Invisible Woman | Blackie Cole | |
| 1941 | Rage in Heaven | Dr. Rameau | |
| 1941 | Ball of Fire | Professor Gurkakoff | |
| 1943 | Mission to Moscow | Maxim Litvinov | |
| 1943 | Hostages | Lev Pressinger | |
| 1947 | The Shop at Sly Corner | Desius Heiss | |
| 1948 | I Remember Mama | Uncle Chris | nominated for an Academy Award for Best Supporting Actor |
| 1949 | Anna Lucasta | Joe Lucasta | |
| 1950 | The White Tower | Andreas | |
| 1951 | Der schweigende Mund | Dr. Herbert Hirth | |
| 1952 | Top Secret | Zekov | |
| 1953 | The House of the Arrow | Inspector Hanaud | |
| 1954 | Prisoner of War | Colonel Biroshilov | |
| 1955 | The Seven Year Itch | Dr. Brubaker | |
| 1956 | War and Peace | Field Marshal Mikhail Kutuzov | |
| 1957 | A Farewell to Arms | Dr. Emerich | |
| 1957 | Alfred Hitchcock Presents | Carl Kaminsky | Season 3 Episode 6: "Reward to Finder" |
| 1958 | The Key | Captain Van Dam | |
| 1958 | Tempest | Savelic | |
| 1960 | Alfred Hitchcock Presents | Carpius | Season 5 Episode 16: "The Ikon of Elijah" |
| 1960 | Alfred Hitchcock Presents | Jan Vander Klaue / Mr. A.J. Keyser | Season 5 Episode 29: "The Hero" |
| 1961 | Mr. Sardonicus | Krull | |
| 1962 | Boys' Night Out | Doctor Prokosch | |
| 1962 | Mooncussers | Urias Hawke | |
| 1962 | The Wonderful World of the Brothers Grimm | The Duke | |
| 1964 | The Long Ships | Krok | |
| 1965 | Joy in the Morning | Stan Pulaski | |
| 1966 | Funeral in Berlin | Colonel Stok | |
| 1967 | The Happening | Sam | |
| 1967 | Billion Dollar Brain | Colonel Stok | |
| 1968 | Assignment to Kill | Inspector Ruff | |
| 1969 | The Madwoman of Chaillot | The Commissar | |
| 1970 | The Executioner | Racovsky | |
| 1970 | Song of Norway | Engstrand | |
| 1974 | The Tamarind Seed | General Golitsyn | |

== See also ==
- List of Academy Award winners and nominees from German-speaking countries
