= Jane Steps Out =

1938 film

- Directed by: Paul L. Stein
- Written by: William Freshman; Dudley Leslie
- Produced by: Walter C. Mycroft
- Starring: Diana Churchill; Jean Muir; Peter Murray-Hill
- Cinematography: Claude Friese-Greene
- Production company: ABPC
- Distributed by: Associated British Film Distributors
- Release date: 16 May 1938
- Running time: 70 minutes
- Country: United Kingdom
- Language: English
- Budget: £23,191

Jane Steps Out is a 1938 British comedy film directed by Paul L. Stein and starring Diana Churchill, Jean Muir, Peter Murray-Hill and Athene Seyler. It was written by William Freshman and Dudley Leslie.

The film was remade as a BBC play in 1957, and as the Hindi film Love in Simla (1960) that made Sadhana Shivdasani into a star.

== Preservation status ==
The British Film Institute National Archive holds a collection of ephemera and stills but no film or video materials.

== Plot summary ==
A young woman is overshadowed by her more glamorous sister. With the help of her grandmother she transforms herself and is able to attract a man.

== Cast ==
- Diana Churchill as Jane Wilton
- Jean Muir as Beatrice Wilton
- Peter Murray-Hill as Basil Gilbert
- Athene Seyler as Grandma
- Fred Emney as General Wilton
- Iris Hoey as Mrs Wilton
- Judy Kelly as Margot Kent

== Reception ==
The Monthly Film Bulletin wrote: "The outstanding figure in an amusing film is 'Granny' – full of slang, vigour, and shrewdness – played by Athene Seyler. Iris Hoey is good as the fluttering and futile mother. Well produced film in light comedy vein with a rather weak ending."

Kine Weekly wrote: "Delightful domestic comedy, represented by a new and piquant interpretation of the evergreen Cinderella theme. An ugly duckling rehabilitation is the main fount of humour and sentiment and this, thanks to clever acting on the part of Diana Churchill, and sterling work by a first-rate supporting cast, sprinkles the screen with entertainment of irresistible appeal. It's a sheer joy from start to finish, and a box-office one at that."

The Daily Film Renter wrote: "Romantic comedy on Cinderella lines, with 'plain Jane' heroine emerging from chrysalis to annex catty sister's boyfriend. Amusing dialogue and piquant situations keep fun at concert pitch throughout, while Diana Churchill cleverly handles leading role, and Fred Emney is immense as fatuous general. Nicely staged, bright popular entertainment of wholesome calibre."
