= Kenneth Kent =

English actor (1892–1963)

- Born: 20 April 1892; Liverpool, England
- Died: 17 November 1963 (aged 71); London, England
- Other name: Keneth Kent
- Education: Royal Academy of Dramatic Art
- Occupation: Actor
- Years active: 1912–1955

Kenneth Kent (20 April 1892 – 17 November 1963) was an English actor. He is most notable for his roles as Inspector Hanaud in the film At the Villa Rose (1940) and as Emperor Napoleon in the film Idol of Paris (1948).

== Partial filmography ==
- Queer Cargo (1938) - Vibart
- Luck of the Navy (1938) - Col. Suvaroff
- At the Villa Rose (1940) - Inspector Hanaud
- Night Train to Munich (1940) - Controller
- The House of the Arrow (1940) - Inspector Hanaud
- Dangerous Moonlight (1941) - Andre De Guise
- The Idol of Paris (1948) - Emperor Napoleon
- A Time to Kill (1955) - Dr. Cole (final film role)
