= At the Villa Rose (novel) =

1910 detective novel by A.E.W. Mason

- First edition
- Author: A. E. W. Mason
- Language: English
- Series: Inspector Hanaud
- Genre: Detective fiction
- Publisher: Hodder & Stoughton (UK); The Musson Book Company (Canada); Charles Scribner's Sons (US)
- Publication date: 1910
- Media type: Print
- Pages: 311
- Followed by: The Affair at the Semiramis Hotel

At the Villa Rose is a 1910 detective novel by the British writer A. E. W. Mason, the first to feature his character Inspector Hanaud. The story became Mason's most successful novel of his lifetime. It was adapted by him as a stage play in 1920, and was used as the basis for four film adaptions between 1920 and 1940.

== Plot ==
Inspector Hanaud, the well-known French detective, is on holiday in Aix les Bains when he is asked by a young Englishman, Harry Wethermill, to investigate the murder of a wealthy widow, Mme Dauvray. Mme Dauvray has been strangled and her valuable jewels, which she wore ‘with too little prudence’, are missing. Her maid Hélène Vauquier has been discovered upstairs, unconscious, chloroformed, and with her hands tied behind her back. Suspicion immediately falls on Mme Dauvray’s young English companion, Celia Harland, who has vanished. Celia is in love with Wethermill, and the latter pleads with Hanaud to take on the case in the unshakeable conviction that in spite of appearances Celia is innocent of the crime. Hanaud agrees to do so.

Mme Dauvray had been fascinated by spiritualism and part of Celia’s role as companion had been to stage séances for her and, as a supposed medium, to conjure up manifestations from the spirit world – which she did by acting and trickery. Hanaud discovers that she was to have conducted a séance on the night of the murder.

Adèle Tacé (who calls herself Mme Rossignol) is a practised criminal who has come to Aix specifically to steal Mme Dauvray’s jewels. In league with Hélène Vauquier, she professes disbelief in spiritualism and goads the old lady into holding a séance in which Celia will be expected to perform while bound hand and foot. To avoid being exposed as a fraud to Mme Dauvray and to her lover Harry, Celia agrees to co-operate, believing she can quite easily extricate herself. On the night, however, she is bound far more professionally and tightly than she had anticipated and, when unexpectedly secured to a pillar and gagged, realises that she is a prisoner. Seeing a man stealing in at the french window and recognising Harry Wethermill, Celia rejoices and expects release. But all he does is to check that her bonds are tight. Celia is unable to escape or to cry out as he strangles Mme Dauvray.

Wethermill, Hélène and Adèle search without success for the jewels, and are forced to suspend their efforts when they hear footsteps outside. Hélène voluntarily allows herself to be chloroformed, to avoid suspicion falling on her. Celia, meanwhile, is abducted and taken to Geneva, being kept alive solely so that she can tell the gang where the jewels are hidden. When the newspapers report that the missing jewels have been found by the police, the gang have no further use for Celia and they prepare to drug her and dispose of her body in the lake. Hanauld arrives just in time.

Cover of first Canadian edition

== Background ==
Mason himself provided a fairly detailed account of the novel's background. Visiting a hotel in Richmond, Mason's attention was drawn to two names that had been scratched by a diamond ring in a window pane: Madame Fougère, a wealthy woman who had been murdered the year before at Aix les Bains, and that of her maid who had been found bound and chloroformed in her bed. He looked up the French newspapers and read the accounts of the real-life trial, keeping them tucked away in his mind for future use. The character of Celia came from a recollection of a conjurer and his daughter whom Mason had seen once or twice in provincial concert-rooms. A detail in the novel which fixes the time of the murder – a passing policeman closes a door and later finds it standing open again – came from a murder trial that Mason had attended at the Old Bailey. He recorded that the story, "detective and all, rolled itself out" over the course of two or three evenings while he dined in a restaurant in Geneva, overlooking the lake.

== Critical reception ==
On its publication in book form in 1910 the novel received a warm reception, and it achieved a circulation greater than any other of Mason's novels. According to The British Weekly, it was "one of the best, most artistic, most engrossing detective stories ever written", with other papers also echoing its praise. In 1940 Hugh Walpole called it "The best detective novel of the last thirty years".

However, in their 1989 A Catalogue of Crime Barzun and Taylor were more critical: they called the characters 'cardboard' and felt that the author's skill in plotting and telling did not compensate for the book's period faults.

Writing in 2017, Martin Edwards called At the Villa Rose “a landmark of the genre” in which real-life source material is blended with phoney spiritualism, baffling but logical detective work, and an unexpected villain. Its main flaw, he thought, was a lopsided story structure in which the murderer is revealed part way through the novel, with the later chapters amounting to an extended flashback.

== Adaptations ==
=== Radio ===
In July 1926 the novel became the first to be transmitted over the air as a BBC serial. Mason himself presented an introductory talk on the book's genesis, then read it (in abbreviated form) over five succeeding nights.

=== Stage ===
Mason's stage version of the novel, also called At the Villa Rose, opened at the Strand Theatre, London, on 10 July 1920, with Arthur Bourchier in the role of Hanaud, Kyrle Bellew as Celia and Harcourt Williams as Wethermill. It was reported to be unusual in that the identity of the murderer was revealed from the start but with the tension maintained until the end. The play was a success with 227 performances, and became the most profitable of any that Mason wrote. Dennis Eadie played Hanaud in a 1928 London revival.

=== Film ===
The novel has been adapted four times for the screen:

- At the Villa Rose (silent, 1920)
- At the Villa Rose (1930)
- Le mystère de la villa rose [The Mystery of the Villa Rose] (in French, 1930)
- At the Villa Rose (1940)

== Bibliography ==
- Green, Roger Lancelyn (1952). A. E. W. Mason. London: Max Parrish.
- Barzun, Jacques; Taylor, Wendall Hertig (1989). A Catalogue of Crime (2nd ed.). New York: Harper & Row. ISBN 0-06-015796-8.
- Edwards, Martin (2017). The Story of Classic Crime in 100 Books. London: The British Library. ISBN 978-0-7123-5696-1.
