= Tragedy of the Street =

1927 film

- Theatrical film poster
- German: Dirnentragödie
- Directed by: Bruno Rahn
- Written by: Wilhelm Braun (play); Ruth Goetz; Leo Heller
- Starring: Asta Nielsen; Hilde Jennings; Oskar Homolka
- Cinematography: Guido Seeber
- Music by: Felix Bartsch
- Production company: Pantomim-Film
- Distributed by: Pantomim-Film
- Release date: 14 April 1927
- Running time: 85 minutes
- Country: Germany
- Languages: Silent; German intertitles

Tragedy of the Street (German: Dirnentragödie) is a 1927 German silent drama film directed by Bruno Rahn and starring Asta Nielsen, Hilde Jennings and Oskar Homolka. The 85-minute film is also known by the alternative title Women Without Men.

== Cast ==
- Asta Nielsen as Auguste - old street walker
- Hilde Jennings as Clarissa - young street walker
- Oskar Homolka as Anton - pimp
- Werner Pittschau as Felix - student
- Hedwig Pauly-Winterstein as his mother
- Otto Kronburger as his father
- Hermann Picha as Kauzke - pianist
- Gerhard Dammann
- Eva Speyer as prostitute

== See also ==
- Between Night and Dawn (1931)
