= Barbara Gott =

Scottish actress (1872–1944)

- Barbara Gott in Downhill (1927)
- Born: 1872; Stirling, Stirlingshire, UK
- Died: 18 November 1944 (aged 71); London, UK
- Years active: 1906–1940

Barbara Gott (1872–1944) was a Scottish stage and film actress. In 1913, she made her West End debut in Stanley Houghton's Trust the People.

== Partial filmography ==
- Betta, the Gipsy (1918)
- The Romance of Lady Hamilton (1919) – Mrs. Kelly
- Linked by Fate (1919) – Deborah
- The Little People (1927) – Sala
- Downhill (1927) – Madame Michet
- Not Quite a Lady (1928) – Mrs. Borridge
- Paradise (1928) – Lady Liverage
- Ringing the Changes (1929) – Mrs. Giggleswick
- Lily of Killarney (1929) – Sheelah
- A Sister to Assist 'Er (1930) – Mrs. May
- The House of the Arrow (1930) – Mrs. Harlow
- The Night Porter (1930)
- At the Villa Rose (1930) – Mme. D'Auvray
- Lord Richard in the Pantry (1930) – Cook
- Compromising Daphne (1930) – Martha
- The Sport of Kings (1931) – Cook
- Sally in Our Alley (1931) – Mrs. Pool
- The Flying Fool (1931) – Mme. Charron
- Sunshine Susie (1931) – Minor Role
- The Professional Guest (1931)
- The Water Gipsies (1932) – Mrs. Green
- A Safe Proposition (1932) – Emily Woodford
- The Good Companions (1933) – Big Annie
- The Crime at Blossoms (1933) – Fat Lady
- Born Lucky (1933) – Cook
- Cleaning Up (1933) – Lady Rudd
- Great Stuff (1933) – Claudette Montgomery
- Song at Eventide (1934) – Anna
- Children of the Fog (1935) – Mrs. Jenner
- The Beloved Vagabond (1936) – Concierge
- Pastor Hall (1940) – Frau Kemp (final film role)

== Bibliography ==
- Wearing, J.P. The London Stage 1910-1919: A Calendar of Productions, Performers, and Personnel.. Rowman & Littlefield, 2013.
