= Queer Cargo =

1938 British film by Harold D. Schuster

- Directed by: Harold D. Schuster
- Written by: Patrick Kirwan; Walter Summers
- Based on: the play Queer Cargo by Noel Langley
- Produced by: Walter C. Mycroft
- Starring: John Lodge; Judy Kelly; Kenneth Kent
- Cinematography: Otto Kanturek
- Production company: Associated British Picture Corporation
- Distributed by: Associated British Film Distributors
- Release date: 6 August 1938
- Running time: 61 minutes
- Country: United Kingdom
- Language: English
- Budget: £33,923

Queer Cargo (also known as Pirates of the Seven Seas) is a 1938 British second feature ('B') drama film directed by Harold D. Schuster and starring John Lodge, Judy Kelly and Kenneth Kent. It was written by Patrick Kirwan| and Walter Summers based on the 1932 play of the same title by Noel Langley, and made at Elstree Studios.

== Plot ==
Captain Harley is forced by his ship's owner to smuggle pearls on his tramp steamer to Singapore. En route, the ship's crew mutinies, and then the ship is attacked by pirates.

== Cast ==
- John Lodge as Capt. Harley
- Judy Kelly as Ann Warren
- Kenneth Kent as Vibart
- Bertha Belmore as Henrietta Travers
- Louis Borel as Benson
- Wylie Watson as Rev. James Travers
- Geoffrey Toone as Lt. Stocken
- Jerry Verno as Slops
- Frank Pettingell as Dan
- Frank Cochran as Ho Tang

== Reception ==
The Monthly Film Bulletin wrote: "This somewhat complicated story promises excitement and thrills which never come to anything. In its development it is unconvincing and improbable. There is a good deal of rather brutal fighting. Comedy relief is supplied by Henrietta Travers and her brother, but bricks cannot be made without straw, and laboured and inept dialogue hampers even so experienced a couple as Bertha Belmore and Wylie Watson."

Kine Weekly wrote: "The most impressive feature of the picture is the resourceful blending of authentic shots with studio work. Atmosphere at times is really good but the direction unfortunately lacks the ingenuity and invention displayed by the technical department. Every time the dramatic motif is about to assert itself silly comedy crops up to injure stern and colourful illusion. With all the play's thematic scope, it seldom escapes from the threadbare inhibitions of the theatre. Very ordinary programme fare."

Variety wrote: "Picture of the shipping industry in China seas is rather well done. Good cast helps make for a smooth performance. ... The plot proceeds along to what looks like surefire situations and progression for a popular film. It has practically all the ingredients for general appeal here. It might get by in America on the duals."
