= Rhythm Serenade =

- Directed by: Gordon Wellesley
- Written by: Basil Woon; Marjorie Deans; Margaret Kennedy; Edward Dryhurst
- Produced by: George Formby; Ben Henry
- Starring: Vera Lynn; Peter Murray-Hill; Julien Mitchell
- Cinematography: Geoffrey Faithfull; Erwin Hillier
- Edited by: Alan Jaggs
- Music by: Harry Bidgood
- Production company: Columbia British Productions
- Distributed by: Columbia Pictures
- Release date: 11 October 1943
- Running time: 87 minutes
- Country: United Kingdom
- Language: English
- Box office: £67,010

Rhythm Serenade is a 1943 British musical film directed by Gordon Wellesley and starring Vera Lynn, Peter Murray-Hill and Julien Mitchell. George Formby, then under contract to Columbia, served as associate producer.

== Plot ==
A teacher goes to work organising a nursery for a munitions factory. She establishes one at a cottage and has a romance with the owner.

== Songs ==
(all performed by Vera Lynn)

- "Bye and Bye" (Jimmy Wakely, Fred Rose and Johnny Marvin)
- "I Love to Sing" (Paul Misraki, with English lyrics by Michael Carr and Tommie Connor)
- "It Doesn't Cost a Dime" (Michael Carr and Tommie Connor)
- "So it Goes On"
- "The Sunshine of Your Smile" (Leonard Cooke and Lilian Ray)
- "When We’re Home Sweet Home Again" (Annette Mills and Fred Prisker)
- "With All My Heart" (Reginald King and Jack Popplewell)

== Cast ==
- Vera Lynn as Ann Martin
- Peter Murray-Hill as John Drover
- Julien Mitchell as Mr. Jimson
- Charles Victor as Mr. Martin
- Jimmy Jewel as Jimmy Martin
- Ben Warriss as Ben Martin
- Joss Ambler as Mr. Preston
- Rosalyn Boulter as Monica Jimson
- Betty Jardine as Helen
- Irene Handl as Mrs. Crumbling
- Lloyd Pearson as Mr. Simkins
- Jimmy Clitheroe as Joey
- Joan Kemp-Welch in a bit part
- Aubrey Mallalieu as vicar
- Leslie Phillips as soldier

== Production ==
It was shot at the Riverside Studios in Hammersmith. The film's sets were designed by the art director George Provis. It was made by the British subsidiary of Columbia Pictures.

== Reception ==
The Monthly Film Bulletin wrote: "Propaganda, apparently, is one of the main ingredients of a successful film today, and Rhythm Scrvenade does not escape its ration of patriotism. Evacuees, commandos, soldiers, A.T.S., the Navy and war workers are all brought together in the frame of a slight story about the homefront, and love and music are also given their due place. Director Gordon Wellesley winds his way in and out of the various complications with considerable skill and manages to arrive at the inevitable happy ending quite smoothly, while Bert Mason's camera work deserves special mention. Vera Lynn sings as well as ever, and Peter Murray-Hill as John Drover gives a good performance. The supporting cast, including Jewell and Warriss, the comedians, is well chosen."

Kine Weekly wrote: "The tale is not particularly well knit, neither does it take the quickest path to its obvious happy ending, but it, nevertheless, patterns into agreeable popular entertainment."

Picturegoer wrote: "Vera Lynn's voice is good as usual and the support does quite well,"
