= Children of the Fog =

1937 British film by John Quin and Leopold Jessner

- Trade show advertisement from The Daily Film Renter (15 February 1937)
- Directed by: John Quin; Leopold Jessner
- Screenplay by: John Cousins
- Based on: 1928 novel Children of the Fog: A Novel of Southwark by Carmel Haden Guest
- Starring: Barbara Gott; Ben Soutten; Rani Waller
- Cinematography: Eugen Schüfftan
- Production company: Jesba
- Distributed by: National Provincial Film Distributors Ltd
- Release date: 1937
- Running time: 62 minutes
- Country: United Kingdom
- Language: English

Children of the Fog is a 1937 British film directed by John Quin and Leopold Jessner, and starring Barbara Gott, Ben Soutten and Rani Waller. It was written by John Cousins based on the 1928 novel Children of the Fog: A Novel of Southwark by Carmel Haden Guest, and made as a quota quickie at Southall Studios.

== Plot ==
In London dockland, drunken deliveryman Butcher takes a piano to the slum dwelling of Mrs Jenner, whose young son Bert is a musical prodigy. He meets and marries unmarried mother Alice Crimson, who has a daughter, Joan. Alice later dies giving birth. Grown up, Butcher's son Eddy marries Joan and they emigrate to Australia in search of a better life. Bert becomes a famous and rich composer.

== Cast ==
- Barbara Gott as Mrs Jenner
- Ben Soutten as Butcher
- Rani Waller as Alice Crimson
- Marjorie Corbett as Joan
- Kenneth Guthrie as Eddy Butcher
- Linden Travers as Polly Mortimer
- Laurence Hepworth as Bert Jenner
- Eric Pavitt as Syd Butcher
- Vi Kaley as charwoman
- Catharina Ferraz as Emma
- Pamela Standish as Polly
- Robert Rietti as boy

== Preservation status ==
The British Film Institute National Archive holds no stills or ephemera, and no film or video materials.

== Reception ==
The Monthly Film Bulletin wrote: "A sincere but stilted and naive story of London's dockland. ... Had it been frank social propaganda it would at least have had something to say, but it never grips enough for one to feel sympathy with the characters. The film makes an honest attempt to present poverty and its effects, but the theme requires more skill and insight than it is given here. The acting is not realistic enough with the honourable exception of Barbara Gott's; and the accent of Bert and Eddy, two of the main characters, never came out of a slum."

Kine Weekly wrote: "A depressing and unconvincing story of life in a dockland slum which never succeeds in reaching higher than the level of mediocrity. The plot is artificial and stilted and only serves as a clumsy method of advocating the undefined benefits to be gained by emigration to Australia. Mediocre even for quota purposes. ... The dialogue is stilted and the characters for the most part speak Cockney with a refined gentility that robs the lines of such point as they may possess."

The Daily Film Renter wrote: "Drama of dockside life tracing careers of different East End families. Ingenuous plot and frankly sentimental treatment blended with full-blooded comedy and clever juvenile performances. Quite unpretentious but obvious sincerity of the offering add to appeal, and innumerable Cockney touches should make picture popular entertainment for industrial halls."
