= Reginald King (composer) =

English composer, pianist and orchestral leader (1904–1991)

Reginald Claude McMahon King (5 October 1904 – 31 August 1991) was a British light music composer, pianist, conductor and broadcaster, the founder and leader of Reginald King and his Orchestra.

== Biography ==
King was born in Hampstead into a musical family: his father Conrad King composed ballads and was a singing teacher. He studied at Blackheath Conservatoire (1918–20) and then at the Royal Academy of Music with Charles Reddie (piano) and Harry Farjeon (composition). While there he composed a Piano Concerto in F minor, which was conducted by Alexander Mackenzie and which won him the McFarren Scholarship in 1921. The concerto was later reworked as the Fantasy for Piano and Orchestra (1946). He married a contemporary at the academy, Beatrice Annie Thomas.

Immediately after leaving the academy in 1924 King was engaged by Sir Henry Wood as a Bach soloist at the Proms for three years in a row. In 1927 he formed an orchestral ensemble to play at the fifth floor restaurant of Swan & Edgar's department store in London's Piccadilly Circus. It played for 12 years until the outbreak of war in 1939. In 1934 he also formed the Celebrity Trio with violinist Alfredo Campoli, and cellist Douglas Cameron. After the war he reformed the orchestra. King was also a frequent broadcaster, making over 1,400 appearances on BBC Radio between 1929 and 1964 (including many appearances on the long-running Sunday evening show Grand Hotel), and recorded frequently for His Master's Voice and other record labels.

King established post-war residencies for his orchestra at the Spa Pavilion in Whitby from 1945 and then at Bridlington's Floral Pavilion from 1954, but retired in 1964 as the rise of pop pushed his style of music out of fashion. In retirement he was living in South Anston, near Sheffield. He died in 1991, survived by his wife Rebé King.

== Music ==
King's early compositions include a Piano Sonata in F-sharp minor (1924), two books of preludes (op. 5 and op. 7) and a Violin Sonata. But he became best known for the many light music genre pieces he wrote for piano with descriptive titles like Passing Clouds, Polka Piquante and Where Water Lilies Dream. The miniature Song of Paradise, later orchestrated, became his signature tune. He also produced ballads for voice and piano, including With All My Heart, performed by Vera Lynn during the war and included in her 1943 film Rhythm Serenade.

For his orchestra he composed many suites, overtures, marches and intermezzos, some of them derived from his piano music and orchestrated by others. These include the suite In the Chilterns (1937), the overture The Immortals (1939), and the march Lime Grove (1955). He continued to compose until the very end of his life: his late pieces include an Elegy for solo piano (1989), the Meditation for clarinet and piano (1990) and the extended Reverie for piano solo, his last composition.

Mark Bebbington recorded a selection of his piano miniatures in 2013. The Immortals overture has been recorded by the London Symphony Orchestra conducted by Walter Goehr.
