= Fire Over England =

1937 British film by William K. Howard

- Film poster
- Directed by: William K. Howard
- Screenplay by: Clemence Dane; Sergei Nolbandov
- Based on: Fire Over England; 1936 novel by A. E. W. Mason
- Produced by: Erich Pommer; Alexander Korda
- Starring: Flora Robson; Laurence Olivier; Vivien Leigh; Leslie Banks; Raymond Massey
- Cinematography: James Wong Howe
- Edited by: Jack Dennis
- Music by: Richard Addinsell
- Color process: Black and white
- Production company: London Film Productions
- Distributed by: United Artists
- Release date: 5 March 1937
- Running time: 92 minutes
- Country: United Kingdom
- Language: English

Fire Over England is a 1937 London Film Productions film drama, notable for providing the first pairing of Laurence Olivier and Vivien Leigh. It was directed by William K. Howard and written by Clemence Dane, nominally from the 1936 novel Fire Over England by AEW Mason. Leigh's performance in the film helped to convince David O. Selznick to cast her as Scarlett O'Hara in his 1939 production of Gone with the Wind. The film is a historical drama set during the reign of Elizabeth I focusing on England's victory over the Spanish Armada.

== Plot ==
During the reign of Queen Elizabeth I, England is concerned by the impending arrival of the Spanish Armada. In 1588, relations between Spain and England are at breaking point. With the support of Queen Elizabeth I, English privateers such as Sir Francis Drake regularly capture Spanish merchantmen bringing gold from the New World.

Elizabeth's chief advisers are the Lord Treasurer, Lord Burleigh, and her longtime admirer, Robert Dudley, Earl of Leicester. Burleigh's 18-year-old granddaughter Cynthia is one of Elizabeth's ladies-in-waiting, and the ageing queen is plagued by jealousy of the girl's beauty and vivacity.

In a sea battle between the Spanish, led by Don Miguel, and the English, led by his old friend Sir Richard Ingolby the English are captured. Miguel allows Richard's son Michael to escape. Michael swims ashore on Miguel's estate, and his wounds are tended to by Miguel's daughter Elena, who quickly becomes enamoured of the handsome Englishman, despite her being engaged to marry. As the months pass, Michael recovers and laments being apart from Cynthia, his sweetheart, but is nonetheless impressed by Elena's charms.

Miguel brings Michael the sad news that Sir Richard, his father, has been executed as a heretic by the Inquisition. The grieving Michael denounces his rescuers and flees to England in a small fishing boat. When he is granted an audience with the Queen he urges her to fight the Spanish menace by whatever means necessary, and swears undying loyalty to her. Elizabeth is flattered by the young man's fervent devotion and later has an opportunity to take advantage of his offer of service when Hillary Vane, an Englishman spying for Spain, is killed before the names of his English co-conspirators can be uncovered.

Michael, disguised as Vane, goes to the court of King Philip II of Spain to get the letters that will set into motion a plan to assassinate Elizabeth. At the palace Michael meets Elena. Her father has been killed by the English and she is now married to Don Pedro, the palace governor. Elena keeps Michael's identity a secret as long as she can, but finally must tell her husband out of loyalty to him.

Philip sees through Michael's disguise and orders his arrest. Pedro helps him escape so that it will not be discovered that his wife aided a heretic. While Michael is returning home, the Spanish Armada sails against England and Elizabeth addresses her army at Tilbury. Michael meets her there and reveals the names of the traitors. Elizabeth knights Michael before confronting the six traitors, inviting them to fulfill their plot and kill her. Overwhelmed with shame, they agree to accompany Michael on a mission to deploy fire ships in a night attack on the Armada, massed off the coast of England.

The tactic succeeds, and Elizabeth allows Michael and Cynthia to marry.

== Cast ==
- Flora Robson as Queen Elizabeth I of England
- Raymond Massey as King Philip II of Spain
- Leslie Banks as 'Robin', the Earl of Leicester
- Laurence Olivier as Michael Ingolby
- Vivien Leigh as Cynthia
- Morton Selten as Lord Burleigh
- Tamara Desni as Elena
- Lyn Harding as Sir Richard Ingolby
- George Thirlwell as Mr. Lawrence Gregory
- Henry Oscar as the Spanish Ambassador
- Robert Rendel as Don Miguel
- Robert Newton as Don Pedro
- Donald Calthrop as Don Escobal
- Charles Carson as Admiral Valdez
- James Mason as Hillary Vane, an English traitor
- Francis de Wolff as Sir James Tarleton

== Production ==
With the working title of Glorianna, principal photography took place at Denham Studios, where a large water tank was used to launch the model ships representing the Spanish Armada and the English naval defenders. Originally Conrad Veidt was to star, but Alexander Korda saw the production as a star vehicle for Vivien Leigh, who was under contract to Korda. Along with the historical drama that was portrayed, Fire Over England was also a costume romance that served to showcase Leigh and Olivier, a real-life romantic couple. Robson would play Queen Elizabeth again in the 1940 film The Sea Hawk.

== The Lion Has Wings ==
A portion of the film, including the beacons being lit on the English coast, and an armour-clad Queen Elizabeth giving her speech to the surrounding soldiers at Tilbury before the Battle of Gravelines, was used in the 1939 World War II propaganda documentary The Lion Has Wings. It is used to compare the Spanish invasion attempt to a Nazi invasion, demonstrating how Great Britain had survived against great odds in the past, and would again.

== Reception ==
Fire Over England was the first British film to have its US premiere at Los Angeles. Overall, the picture garnered positive reviews. In the review in Variety, the comment was "This is a handsomely mounted and forcefully dramatic glorification of Queen Bess. It holds a succession of brilliantly played scenes, a wealth of choice diction, pointed excerpts from English history and a series of impressive tableaux." Writing for The Spectator in 1937, Graham Greene gave the film a mixed review, acknowledging it as "well-directed and lavish", but criticizing its lack of historical realism. Greene stated that "the sets are magnificent" and that "the acting is far better than we are accustomed to in English films", but considered the production to have "strayed out of history" and called certain scenes "absurd" and "embarrassing". In a later review, Greene classed the film as "third-rate", where "Queen Elizabeth as headmistress of Cheltenham Ladies' College wins the devotion of all the junior mistresses and even some of the governors - though there's some dirty work with model ships in the swimming baths". The League of Nations Committee on Motion Pictures awarded the 1937 Cinema Medal of Honor to Fire Over England.

== See also ==
- List of films in the public domain in the United States
