= The Prisoner in the Opal =

1928 detective novel by A.E.W. Mason

- First edition (UK)
- Author: A. E. W. Mason
- Language: English
- Series: Inspector Hanaud
- Genre: Detective fiction
- Publisher: Hodder & Stoughton (UK); Doubleday Doran (US)
- Publication date: 1928
- Media type: Print
- Pages: 344
- Preceded by: The House of the Arrow
- Followed by: They Wouldn't Be Chessmen

The Prisoner in the Opal is a British detective novel by A.E.W. Mason, serialised in The Pall Mall Magazine and published in book form in 1928. It is the third full-length novel in Mason's Inspector Hanaud series, and the only one to feature the occult as a significant plot point.

Critical opinion has been mixed, with one writer considering the novel to be one of Mason's best, while another considered it "pretentious and cluttered".

== Plot ==
Julius Ricardo, a middle-aged wine connoisseur, makes a point of keeping his wine knowledge up to date by spending several weeks every summer visiting the vineyards of Bordeaux. In London, he is asked by the young and beautiful American Joyce Whipple to keep an eye on her friend Diana Tasborough who owns the estate at Chateau Suvlac. Joyce has received letters from Diana which convince her that her friend is threatened by great evil, though there is nothing overt in the letters and she is unable to explain why. Ricardo suggests that Diana's fiancé, Bryce Carter, would be the best person to deal with this, or even Joyce herself. A clearly embarrassed Joyce explains that Diana and Bryce's engagement has recently been broken off.

Invited to stay at the Chateau Suvlac, Ricardo finds the atmosphere strained. Diana is distracted, and one of her house guests, Evelyn Devenish, seems to feel an extraordinary hatred for Joyce. Ricardo is introduced to Diana's estate manager Robin Webster, and to the owner of the adjacent estate Le Vicomte de Mirandol.

That night, unable to sleep, Ricardo sees from his bedroom window a light burning late in Robin Webster's chalet, and across the valley the lights shining out from de Mirandol's house. In the morning, both Evelyn and Joyce have disappeared from their rooms. Robin Webster has injured his hand. A large basket is found in a nearby river containing the naked body of Evelyn Devenish; her right hand has been hacked off. Joyce remains missing.

Ricardo's old friend Inspector Hanuad of the Paris Sûreté investigates, working with the local examining magistrate Arthur Tidon. Hanaud visits de Mirandol and finds him, oddly, repainting his garden gate. In the upstairs room that had been lit at 2am he finds a conference table that has recently been re-covered and a large cupboard, opening in the manner of an altar screen, that has been freshly painted white. He announces that Evelyn Devenish had been killed in that very room.

Hanaud locates Joyce, and with Ricardo's help rescues her shortly before she is due to be killed. Safely back, she explains that during her time at the Chateau Suvlac, she had come to realise that both Evelyn and Diana were besotted with the charismatic Robin Webster. He had toyed with them both, and was getting tired of Evelyn's increasing demands. When Joyce appeared on the scene he had pursued her, too, arousing Evelyn's jealousy. Joyce, however, knew there was something evil about the man.

When Joyce discovered that Robin – once a Catholic priest – had become a renegade and was now the leader of a devil-worshipping sect, she sought to expose him. Hearing that a Black Mass would be taking place in de Mirandol's house on the night of Ricardo's arrival, she had coated the latch of his garden gate with a mixture of varnish and mustard gas, a mixture that would cause severe burns to anyone touching it. Ricardo realises that this would explain both Robin's injury and the dead Evelyn's missing hand.

Then, Joyce continues, she had slipped a sleeping draft into Diana's drink to ensure she would not be able to attend the rite, stole the masked costume she was intending to wear, and covertly took her place. In the upper room, the cupboard was open displaying its diabolical paintings, and the table laid out as an altar. Evelyn lay on it, naked, while Robin said the mass over her. Then, without warning, he plunged a knife into her heart. In the resultant chaos, Joyce slipped out and ran back to the Chateau Suvlac. But unable to make her escape she was captured and imprisoned.

When Hanaud questions de Mirandol, the examining magistrate objects that Hanaud is not treating the investigation with the delicacy it deserves given the social standing of the parties, and attempts to dismiss him. But Hanaud has noticed that Tidon himself is hiding an injured hand. Realising he is trapped, Tidon commits suicide.

Webster and de Mirandol are charged with murder. Joyce and Bryce Carter are free to take up their relationship once more.

== Principal characters ==
- Diana Tasborough, owner of the Chateau Suvlac
- Joyce Whipple, young American woman, friend of Diana
- Evelyn Devenish, acquaintance of Diana
- Robin Webster, Diana's estate manager
- Bryce Carter, former fiancé of Diana
- Le Vicomte Cassandre de Mirandol, owner of adjacent estate
- Arthur Tidon, examining magistrate
- Inspector Hanaud of the Paris Sûreté
- Julius Ricardo, old friend of Hanaud

== Title ==
The novel's title derives from Ricardo's vision of the world as "a vast opal inside which I stood. An opal luminously opaque, so that I was dimly aware of another world outside mine, terrible and alarming". Ricardo himself is the prisoner, dimly aware of another world, but saved by his imperceptiveness from its terrors.

== Background ==
Mason's biographer Roger Lancelyn Green speculated in 1952 that the scheme of varnish and mustard gas spread onto a gate to trap visitors had probably been carried out by Mason himself when he was an intelligence agent in Ireland during the First World War.

== Critical reception ==
Roger Lancelyn Green considered the novel to be one of the best of Mason's detective stories, with only "the rather outré element of devil worship" causing it to be relegated to second place.

In 1984, Barrie Hayne considered the novel to be formulaic, though the darkest and most macabre of all the Hanaud adventures.

In their A Catalogue of Crime (1989) Jacques Barzun and Wendell Hertig Taylor called the novel "the most pretentious and cluttered" of the Hanaud series. They felt that Hanaud did not shine, and that the occult elements of the novel were merely "incidental".

== Bibliography ==
- Green, Roger Lancelyn (1952). A. E. W. Mason. London: Max Parrish.
- Hayne, Barrie (1984). "A. E. W. Mason". In Bargainnier, Earl F. (ed.). Twelve Englishmen of Mystery. Bowling Green, Ohio: Bowling Green University popular Press. ISBN 0-87972-250-9.
- Barzun, Jacques; Taylor, Wendall Hertig (1989). A Catalogue of Crime (2nd ed.). New York: Harper & Row. ISBN 0-06-015796-8.
