= The House of the Arrow (1940 film) =

1940 film by Harold French

- U.S. theatrical poster
- Directed by: Harold French
- Written by: A.E.W. Mason (novel); Doreen Montgomery
- Produced by: Walter C. Mycroft
- Starring: Kenneth Kent; Diana Churchill; Belle Chrystall; Peter Murray-Hill
- Cinematography: Walter J. Harvey
- Edited by: Edward B. Jarvis
- Music by: Harry Acres
- Production company: Associated British Picture Corporation
- Distributed by: ABPC
- Release date: 26 October 1940
- Running time: 66 minutes
- Country: United Kingdom
- Language: English

The House of the Arrow (released in the U.S. by PRC as Castle of Crimes.) is a 1940 British second feature ('B') mystery film directed by Harold French and starring Kenneth Kent, Diana Churchill and Belle Chrystall. It was written by Doreen Montgomery, adapted from A.E.W. Mason's 1924 novel The House of the Arrow.

== Plot ==
When wealthy widow Madame Harlowe is murdered, her niece Betty is the first suspect. When Inspector Hanaud investigates, he discovers that the murderer used curare. He subsequently suspects Mme Harlowe's companion, Ann Upcott, but following a trail of clues eventually apprehends the real murderer.

== Cast ==
- Kenneth Kent as Inspector Hanaud
- Diana Churchill as Betty Harlowe
- Belle Chrystall as Ann Upcott
- Peter Murray-Hill as Jim Frobisher
- Clifford Evans as Maurice Thevenet
- Louise Hampton as Mme. Harlowe
- Catherine Lacey as Francine Rollard
- Aubrey Dexter as Giradot
- James Harcourt as Boris Raviart
- Ivor Barnard as Jean Cladel
- Athene Seyler

== Production ==
The film was made at Elstree Studios.

== Critical reception ==
The Monthly Film Bulletin wrote: "This is a ponderous, slow-moving and somewhat old-fashioned film which, nevertheless, has its moments of suspense. Most people, however, will spot the murderer about ten minutes after the crime is committed, but only a Hanaud could have obtained sufficient proof to justify an arrest. Unfortunately, Keneth Kent does not succeed in conveying the Gallic charm of Hanaud, and, without this, the detective becomes merely a boorishly conceited, if clever, man. All the action is supposed to take place in France, yet no attempt is made either by the actors or direction to suggest a French atmosphere. Diana Churchill and Belle Chrystall act well as two charming suspects, while Peter Murray-Hill adequately supplies the romantic relief, but the intense excitement of the book has not been captured by this screen version"

Kine Weekly wrote: "The intriguing factor of this murder mystery play is that it dangles a murderer, or rather murderess, before the eves of audience, yet succeeds in converting the obvious into the unexpected. The development is restless but direct, and murders are so placed as to inject excitement and suspense at showmanlike intervals. The star's smooth and competent performance consolidates the drama, and good support, colourful atmosphere and good dialogue do the rest."

Variety wrote: "an uninteresting whodunit geared for the duals," and criticised the film for being too wordy, saying, "it's hard for American audiences to understand much of the dialog because of the accents. Acting is stilted, though Kenneth Kent, as a police inspector, gives a fairly strong performance," the reviewer concluding that "Dreary lighting impedes much of the values".

TV Guide gave the film 1/4 stars, writing: "Too bad there's no suspense or intrigue in this stock whodunit. Low production values."

== Bibliography ==
- Wood, Linda. British Films, 1927–1939. British Film Institute, 1986.
