= Peter Murray-Hill =

English actor (1908–1957)

- Murray-Hill c. 1940s
- Born: Peter Auriol Murray Hill; 20 April 1908; Bushey Heath, Hertfordshire, England
- Died: 25 November 1957 (aged 49); London, England
- Occupations: Actor, Publisher
- Years active: 1938–1945 (acting)
- Spouse: Phyllis Calvert (m. 1941)
- Children: 2

Peter Auriol Murray Hill (20 April 1908 – 25 November 1957) was an English actor, antiquarian, and publisher He was married to the actress Phyllis Calvert from 1941 until his death.

== Career ==
=== Acting ===
Murray Hill's first prominent acting role was in 1938's Jane Steps Out. Also in 1938, Murray Hill was cast in the lead role in Mr. Reeder in Room 13. He was cast in the secondary male lead in The Outsider in 1939, alongside George Sanders and Mary Maguire.

His acting career peaked in the late 1930s. By the early 1940s, he returned to playing secondary lead roles in films such as At the Villa Rose and The House of the Arrow. By the mid-1940s, he was cast mostly in supporting roles. His final film was They Were Sisters, released in 1945, which also starred his wife, Phyllis Calvert.

=== In books ===
As an antiquarian, Murray Hill specialised in 18th-century books. By the 1950s he had turned to book publishing, and served as the president of the Antiquarian Booksellers Association from 1956 until his death in 1957.

== Personal life ==
Murray Hill met actress Phyllis Calvert during a West End production of the play Punch without Judy in 1939. They were married in 1941. They had two children: Ann Auriol (born 1943) and Piers (born 1954). Murray Hill and Calvert were married for sixteen years, until Murray Hill's death in 1957. Calvert never remarried.

== Selected filmography ==
- A Yank at Oxford (1938)
- Jane Steps Out (1938)
- Mr. Reeder in Room 13 (1938)
- The Outsider (1939)
- At the Villa Rose (1940)
- The House of the Arrow (1940)
- The Ghost Train (1941)
- Rhythm Serenade (1943)
- Bell-Bottom George (1944)
- Madonna of the Seven Moons (1945)
- They Were Sisters (1945)
