= Room 13 (1964 film) =

1964 film

- German film poster
- German: Zimmer 13
- Directed by: Harald Reinl
- Written by: Will Tremper
- Based on: Room 13 by Edgar Wallace
- Produced by: Horst Wendlandt; Erwin Gitt
- Starring: Joachim Fuchsberger; Karin Dor; Richard Häussler
- Cinematography: Ernst W. Kalinke
- Edited by: Jutta Hering
- Music by: Peter Thomas
- Production companies: Rialto Film; Société Nouvelle de Cinématographie
- Distributed by: Constantin Film
- Release date: 20 February 1964
- Running time: 89 minutes
- Countries: Denmark; France; West Germany
- Language: German

Room 13 (German: Zimmer 13) is a 1964 thriller film directed by Harald Reinl and starring Joachim Fuchsberger, Karin Dor and Richard Häussler. It was made as a co-production between West Germany, France and Denmark, based on the 1924 novel Room 13 by Edgar Wallace. It was part of Rialto Film's long-running series of German Wallace adaptations.

The film's sets were designed by the art directors Walter Kutz and Wilhelm Vorwerg. It was shot at the Spandau Studios in Berlin and on location in Copenhagen.

== Cast ==
- Joachim Fuchsberger as Johnny Gray
- Karin Dor as Denise
- Richard Häussler as Joe Legge
- Walter Rilla as Sir Marney
- Siegfried Schürenberg as Sir John
- Kai Fischer as Pia Pasani
- Benno Hoffmann as Blackstone-Edward
- Bruno W. Pantel as Sergeant Horse
- Kurd Pieritz as Inspector Terrence
- Erik Radolf as Ambrose
- Eddi Arent as Dr. Higgins
- Hans Clarin as Mr. Igle
- Jur Arten as Gangster Jakob
- Arthur Binder as Slim
- Elfi Estell as Wanda
- Rena Horten as Blond
- Eberhard Junkersdorf as razor blade killer
- Valentin Klaus as Blockstellenwärter
- Manfred Meurer as Gangster
- Tino Meurer as waiter

== See also ==
- Mr. Reeder in Room 13 (1938)
- The Mind of Mr. J.G. Reeder (1969–71)
