= La Maison de la Fléche =

1930 film

- Directed by: Henri Fescourt
- Written by: A.E.W. Mason (book); Pierre Maudru (script)
- Starring: Annabella; Léon Mathot; Alice Field
- Release date: 1930
- Running time: 82 min
- Country: France
- Language: French

La Maison de la Fléche is a 1930 French mystery film directed by Henri Fescourt, starring Alice Field, Léon Mathot and Gaston Dupray. The film was based on the 1924 novel The House of the Arrow by A.E.W. Mason, and was made at Twickenham Studios in London as part of a co-production that saw an English-language version directed by Leslie S. Hiscott.

== Cast ==
- Annabella - Betty Harlowe
- Alice Field - Ann Upcott
- Léon Mathot - Langeac
- Gaston Dupray - Jim Frobisher
- Jeanne Brindeau - Miss Harlowe
- Henri Desfontaines - Bex
- Nadia Debory - Francine Juliard
- Marcel de Garcin - Thévenet
- Robert Casa - Girardot
- Max Maxudian - Boris Waberski
