= At the Villa Rose (1940 film) =

1940 British film by Walter Summers

- Directed by: Walter Summers
- Written by: Doreen Montgomery
- Based on: At the Villa Rose by A.E.W. Mason
- Starring: Kenneth Kent; Judy Kelly
- Cinematography: Claude Friese-Greene
- Edited by: Lionel Tomlinson
- Production company: ABPC
- Distributed by: ABFD (UK)
- Release date: 2 March 1940 (UK)
- Running time: 74 minutes
- Country: United Kingdom
- Language: English
- Budget: £23,549

At the Villa Rose (also known as House of Mystery) is a 1940 British detective film directed by Walter Summers and starring Kenneth Kent and Judy Kelly. It was written by Dooreen Montgomery based on the 1920 novel At the Villa Rose by A.E.W. Mason. It features French detective Inspector Hanaud and was the novel's fourth film adaptation.

== Plot ==
When a rich widow is found murdered in her house, her companion Celia, who has vanished, along with the victim's jewellery, is the chief suspect. Inspector Hanaud investigates.

== Cast ==
- Kenneth Kent as Inspector Hanaud
- Judy Kelly as Celia Harland
- Peter Murray-Hill as Harry Wethermill
- Walter Rilla as Mr. Ricardo
- Ruth Maitland as Madame Dauvray
- Antoinette Cellier as Adele Rossignol
- Clifford Evans as Tace
- Martita Hunt as Helen Vaquier
- Ronald Adam as M. Besnard
- Arthur Hambling as M. Perrichet

== Reception ==
The Monthly Film Bulletin wrote: "The story is ingenious and cleverly worked out, and suspense is well maintained right through to the umespected and effective climax, The pace is swift, development smooth, and director is to be congratulated on an excellent bit of work. The acting is competent throughout. Keneth Kent makes an effective Hanaud. He is cocksure, suave, shrewd and tirelessly thorough at work and play. Judy Kelly is an appealing Celia. Some of the supporting players are a little handicapped by attempts to be French, but all work well together and make a good team. The settings are pleasant and in keeping."

Kine Weekly wrote: "The victims, suspects and clues are assembled at the opening, and the novel touch gives the play colourful atmosphere as well as a swift and intriguing start. Set in fashionable Aix-les-Bains the story keeps one guessing and, at intervals, thrilled from its elegant opening to its grand grand-guignol finale. The director and the players most certainly do right by the famous author. In so doing, they also do right – and that's more important still – by the universal box-office. Incidentally, technical presentation is bevond reproach."

Picturegoer wrote: "A new version of A.E.W. Mason's mystery melodrama which has fair suspense but is not always quite clear in its development. ... Keneth Kent is sound as a self-confident detective and Peter Murray Hill does well as the man about town. Judy Kelly is emotionally effective as the medium."

In British Sound Films: The Studio Years 1928–1959 David Quinlan rated the film as "good", writing: "Well-directed third film version of reliable mystery story."

Allmovie called the film a "modest but intriguing British melodrama."
