= At the Villa Rose (1920 film) =

1920 British film by Maurice Elvey

- Directed by: Maurice Elvey
- Written by: Sinclair Hill
- Based on: At the Villa Rose by A.E.W. Mason
- Produced by: Oswald Stoll
- Starring: Norman Page; Manora Thew; Langhorn Burton; Teddy Arundell
- Cinematography: Paul Burger
- Production company: Stoll Pictures
- Release date: 1920
- Running time: 6276 feet
- Country: United Kingdom
- Language: Silent

At the Villa Rose is a 1920 British silent detective film based on the 1910 novel At the Villa Rose by British politician and author A.E.W. Mason (considered his most famous mystery). The feature was directed by Maurice Elvey and stars Manora Thew and Langhorn Burton. A print of the film survives at the British Film Institute archives.

The novel, which introduced the fictional character of French Police Inspector Hanaud, was so popular, it was filmed four times, the 1920 silent film being the first. The other three film versions were sound versions, two appearing in 1930, and the last in 1940. Although the film is mainly a murder mystery, there are some horror-oriented moments such as a creepy seance scene and a somewhat violent strangulation scene in it as well.

== Plot ==
Inspector Hanaud is asked to investigate a murder in which a young female spiritualist is accused of murdering her wealthy employer in a Riviera mansion and then running away. She is innocent, but the villain is able to make her seem guilty. Hanaud uncovers the truth, that the murder was the result of a jewel robbery gone wrong.

== Cast ==
- Eva Westlake as Madame Dauvray
- J.L. Boston as Besnard
- Joan Beverley as Adele Rossignol
- Kate Gurney as Helene
- Manora Thew as Celia Harland
- Teddy Arundell as Inspector Hanaud
- Norman Page as Julius Ricardo
- Armand Lenders as Perichet
- Langhorn Burton as Harry Weathermill

== Critical reception ==
Allmovie wrote, "British novelist A.E.W. Mason is best known for his jingoistic adventure story The Four Feathers. At the Villa Rose is a lesser but no less florid Mason work. Manora Thew stars as a phony medium, working the suckers in Monaco."
