= At the Villa Rose (1930 film) =

1930 British film by Leslie S. Hiscott

- Theatrical release poster
- Directed by: Leslie S. Hiscott
- Written by: A.E.W. Mason (novel); Cyril Twyford
- Produced by: Henry Edwards; Julius Hagen
- Starring: Norah Baring; Richard Cooper; Austin Trevor
- Cinematography: Sydney Blythe
- Music by: John Greenwood
- Distributed by: Warner Brothers (UK); British International Pictures (US)
- Release date: 30 May 1930 (U.S.)
- Running time: 99 minutes (UK)
- Country: United Kingdom
- Language: English
- Budget: $80,000
- Box office: $200,000

At the Villa Rose (U.S. title: Mystery at the Villa Rose) is a 1930 British mystery film directed by Leslie S. Hiscott and starring Norah Baring, Richard Cooper and Austin Trevor (his screen debut). It was written by Cyril Twyford based on the 1910 novel by A.E.W. Mason.

== Cast ==
- Norah Baring as Celia Harland
- Richard Cooper as Mr. Ricardo
- Austin Trevor as Inspector Hanaud
- Barbara Gott as Madame D'Auvray
- Francis Lister as Weathermill
- Amy Brandon Thomas as Mrs Starling
- Violet Farebrother as Helen
- John F. Hamilton as Mr Starling

== Production ==
The film was made at Twickenham Film Studios in St Margarets, Middlesex. A French-language version The Mystery of the Villa Rose was made simultaneously at Twickenham and the production was announced as being the first bilingual film made in Britain.

== Critical reception ==
Film Weekly wrote: "Shows that Britain can make a mystery film. Worth seeing."

Kine Weekly wrote: "Despite the fact that treatment is a trifle too detailed, this adaptation of A. E. W. Mason's novel is as good a picture of its kind as any other sent out from British or American studios for a long time. Situations are well handled, the characters are interestingly presented, and the mystery of the murder is cleared up by the detective, Hanaud, in an ingenious, dramatically effective way. As acting, camera work and dialogue are all of really good quality, it is clear that a warm welcome from the public awaits the picture. ... Leslie Hiscott's direction is straightforward and sound throughout. It subordinates dialogue and camera work to the story, balances drama with light relief, and is marked by no neglect of opportunity. His achievement is one on which he deserves congratulation."

The New York Times wrote, "Mystery at the Villa Rose, a British audible film of A. E. W. Mason's novel, At the Villa Rose, which is now at the Cameo, is baffling in more ways than one, for the vocal reproduction often is so 'tubby' that it is not always possible to understand what the players are saying. The original story possessed possibilities for quite a good picture, but this screen effort has been handled so amateurishly that one really does not care who poisoned Madame D'Auvray."

== Bibliography ==
- Richards, Jeffrey (ed.) The Unknown 1930s: An Alternative History of the British Cinema, 1929-1939. I.B. Tauris, 1998.
