= Sûreté =

Term for the civil police force in some French-speaking countries

Sûreté (French: [syʁ.te], lit. 'surety' but often translated to 'safety' or 'security') is, in some French-speaking countries or regions, the organizational title of a civil police force.

== Algeria ==
The Directorate General for National Security is known in French as the Sûreté Nationale.

== Belgium ==
The VSSE is known by its French name, Sûreté de l'État.

== Canada ==
The provincial police force of Québec is called the Sûreté du Québec.

== France ==
The French National Police was formerly called Sûreté générale and then Sûreté nationale.

=== History ===
The Sûreté nationale, or Sûreté, began as the criminal investigative bureau of the Préfecture de police de Paris (Paris Police Prefecture) and did not function as the national command and control organization until much later, by which time it no longer had any detectives on its staff.

Both the Paris Police Prefecture's Brigade Criminelle and the Direction centrale de la Police judiciaire trace their history directly to the Sûreté.

The French Sûreté is considered a pioneer of all crime-fighting organizations in the world, although London's Bow Street Runners, founded 1749, served a similar purpose at times. Founded in 1812 by Eugène François Vidocq, who headed it until 1827, it was the inspiration for Scotland Yard, the FBI, and other departments of criminal investigation throughout the world. Vidocq was convinced that crime could not be controlled by then-current police methods, so he organized a special branch of the criminal division modelled on Napoleon's political police. The force was to work undercover and its early members consisted largely of reformed criminals. By 1820 – eight years after its formation – it had blossomed into a 30-man team of experts that had reduced the crime rate in Paris by 40%.

On 23 April 1941, the French police was nationalized under the Vichy regime, and each branch was placed under the prefect. The term Police nationale ("National Police") was then first used – with the sole exception of the Paris Police Prefecture. This organisational name was used during the Fourth and Fifth French Republic.

On 9 July 1964, the previously independent police in Paris were placed under the Sûreté nationale and 10 July 1966 saw the final reorganization into the National Police in its present form.

=== Notable original members ===
- Eugène François Vidocq – founder and first chief

== Morocco ==
The national police force of Morocco is the Sûreté Nationale.

== Switzerland ==
Sûreté is the name of the detective branch of the cantonal police of the French-speaking cantons of Switzerland.
