= A. E. W. Mason =

English novelist (1865–1948)

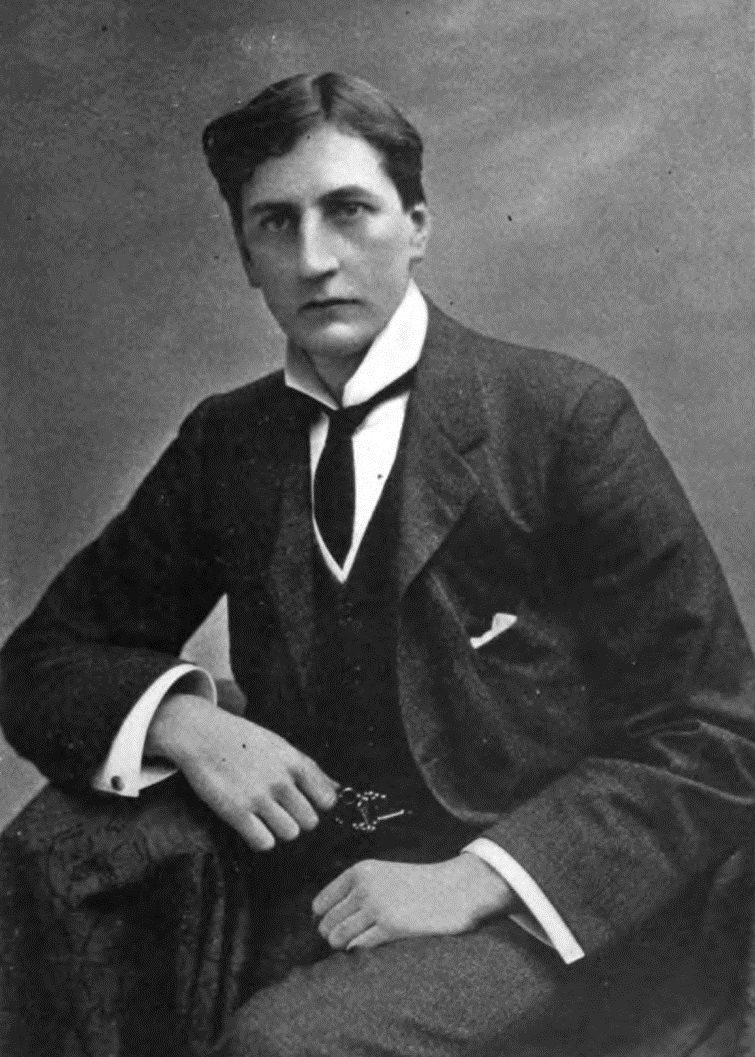
- Born: Alfred Edward Woodley Mason; 7 May 1865; London, England
- Died: 22 November 1948 (aged 83); London, England
- Occupation: Author

Alfred Edward Woodley Mason (7 May 1865 – 22 November 1948) was an English author and Liberal Party Member of Parliament. He is best remembered for his 1902 novel of courage and cowardice in wartime, The Four Feathers, and is also known as the creator of Inspector Hanaud, a French detective who was an early template for Agatha Christie's famous Hercule Poirot.

His prolific output in short stories and novels were frequently made and remade into films during his lifetime; though many of the silent versions have been lost or forgotten, the productions of Fire Over England (1937) and The Four Feathers (1939) remain enduring classics of British cinema.

== Life ==
Mason was born in Camberwell. He studied at Dulwich College and graduated from Trinity College, Oxford, in 1888. He was a contemporary of fellow Liberal Anthony Hope, who went on to write the adventure novel The Prisoner of Zenda. He was an actor before he became a writer, and took the role of Major Plechanoff in the premiere of George Bernard Shaw's Arms and the Man in 1894. He was also an avid cricket player.

Arthur Quiller-Couch and Oscar Wilde encouraged him to write, and his first novel, A Romance of Wastdale, was published in 1895. He was the author of more than 30 books, including At The Villa Rose (1910), a mystery novel in which he introduced his French detective, Inspector Hanaud; Hanaud's career in six novels spanned from before World War I to after World War II.

His best-known book is The Four Feathers, which has been made into several films (see below). Many consider it his masterpiece. Other books are The House of the Arrow (1924), No Other Tiger (1927), The Prisoner in the Opal (1929) and Fire Over England (1937). He contributed a short story, "The Conjurer", to The Queen's Book of the Red Cross.

Mason was elected as a Liberal Member of Parliament for Coventry in the 1906 general election. He served only a single term in Parliament, retiring at the next general election in January 1910.

His first play was the four-act comedy Marjory Strode. Mason wrote three plays that were produced and presented by Sir George Alexander in St James's Theatre. He wrote, "I had three plays produced by George Alexander; one a failure, Colonel Smith, one which made a moderate profit, Open Windows, and one which was a considerable success, The Witness for the Defence." The light farce Colonel Smith opened on 23 April 1909. The Witness for the Defence opened on 1 February 1911, starring Sir George Alexander as Henry Thresk. In 1913 Mason's problem play Open Windows opened on the evening of 11 March, starring Sydney Valentine as Phillip Hammond, Irene Vanbrugh as Cynthia Herrick, Sir George Alexander as John Herrick, with Rosalie Toller as Elsie Herrick.

Four Feathers. Caricature by Max published in Vanity Fair in 1908.

Mason served with the Manchester Regiment in the First World War, being commissioned captain in the 21st Battalion in December 1914. In 1915 he transferred to the 22nd Battalion and then to the General List (reservists). In March 1917 he was granted the temporary rank of major and in October he relinquished his Army commission and joined the Royal Marine Light Infantry with the rank of major. His military career included work in naval intelligence, serving in Spain and Mexico, where he set up counter-espionage networks on behalf of the British government.

Mason turned to non-fiction as well; he wrote a biography of Sir Francis Drake (1941), whose piratical exploits for the Queen figure in Fire Over England. He was working on a non-fiction book about Admiral Robert Blake when he died in 1948.

Mason had been offered a knighthood but reportedly declined it, declaring that such honours meant little to a childless man.

== Works ==
Mason's prolific output included over 30 novels as well as plays, short stories and articles. Many of his novels were adapted for the screen, several multiples times. During the 1910s and 1920s he worked closely with many film directors of the silent era.

== Inspector Hanaud ==
In 1910, Mason undertook to create a fictional detective as different as possible from Sherlock Holmes, who had recently been resuscitated after his supposed death by Arthur Conan Doyle in 1903. Inspector Gabriel Hanaud was stout, not gaunt like Holmes; a professional policeman, not a gentleman amateur; from the French Sûreté, not Victorian England; and relying on psychological insights rather than physical evidence. His "Watson" is a retired London banker named Mr. Julius Ricardo.

Hanaud's appearance in the 1910 novel At The Villa Rose marks "the first major fiction detective of the Twentieth Century," according to a historian of the genre. Set in the south of France, its plot also ridicules spiritualism and mediums, well-known enthusiasms of A. Conan Doyle.

Four more Hanaud novels and several short stories followed, the last, The House in Lordship Lane, in 1946 and the only one set in England.

The first Hanaud book was a best-seller, as were several of Mason’s 30 novels, and as such often adapted into films, often more than once. A 1920 version of At the Villa Rose was a great success in British movie theatres that year, even as a play version of the novel simultaneously began a long run at the Strand. A successful silent version of The Four Feathers followed the next year.

The first sound version of At the Villa Rose was shot both in English and in French at Twickenham Studios in 1930, making it the first British bi-lingual production, released in America under the name The Mystery of the Villa Rose. This marked the film début of Austin Trevor, an actor from Northern Ireland, in the role of Mr. Ricardo. Trevor would go on to be the first actor to create Hercule Poirot on the screen. Veteran British director Walter Summers directed At the Villa Rose, aka House of Mystery, in 1940.

== Film adaptations ==
Mason's historical novel Fire Over England (1936) was set in the 16th century as a beleaguered Elizabeth I of England prepares for invasion by a tyrannical Spain in the throes of the Inquisition. A thinly veiled metaphor for then-neutral Britain's need to prepare for the threat of Nazi invasion, and published while the Spanish Civil War was raging, the book was adapted for film by the author Clemence Dane for Alexander Korda, England's leading film producer; Korda was helping Winston Churchill in his struggle to alert the British people to the military threat of the Third Reich. The lavish costume drama also made stars of Vivien Leigh and Laurence Olivier in their first pairing as lovers onscreen, as they were off-screen.

Korda also produced The Four Feathers (1939), directed by his brother, Zoltan Korda. Filmed on location in the desert of Sudan, starring Ralph Richardson and John Clements; its technicolor cinematography was nominated for an Oscar. Released before Britain's entry into World War II, its pro-British theme also features valiant British fighting against hopeless odds, this time in a late 19th century imperial setting.

Zoltan Korda directed a remake, the much less successful Storm Over the Nile (1955), starring Anthony Steel. Other film versions include three earlier silent films, from 1915, 1921 and 1929, a 1978 American television film with Beau Bridges in the lead role, and The Four Feathers (2002), starring Heath Ledger and Kate Hudson.

== Sources ==
- Green, Roger Lancelyn (1952). A. E. W. Mason. London: Max Parrish.

Parliament of the United Kingdom
Preceded by Charles Murray	Member of Parliament for Coventry; 1906–1910	Succeeded by Kenneth Foster
