= The Four Feathers (disambiguation) =

The Four Feathers is a 1902 novel written by A. E. W. Mason set during the Mahdist War. It has been adapted for film numerous times:

== Film ==
- Four Feathers, a 1915 silent film
- The Four Feathers (1921 film), a silent film
- The Four Feathers (1929 film), a silent film featuring Richard Arlen
- The Four Feathers (1939 film), starring John Clements
- The Four Feathers (1978 film), a television movie starring Beau Bridges
- The Four Feathers (2002 film), by Shekhar Kapur, starring Heath Ledger

== See also ==
- Storm Over the Nile, a 1955 adaptation which borrowed heavily from the 1939 film
- The Two and a Half Feathers a parody from the TV series Dad's Army
