= The Four Feathers (1921 film) =

1921 film by René Plaissetty

- Directed by: René Plaissetty
- Written by: Daisy Martin
- Based on: The Four Feathers; 1902 novel by A. E. W. Mason
- Starring: Harry Ham; Mary Massart; Cyril Percival; Henry Vibart
- Cinematography: Jack E. Cox
- Production company: Stoll Pictures
- Distributed by: Stoll Pictures
- Release date: June 1921
- Running time: 5,000 feet
- Country: United Kingdom
- Language: English

The Four Feathers is a 1921 British silent war film directed by René Plaissetty and starring Harry Ham, Mary Massart, Ernest English, and Henry Vibart. The film is an adaptation of A. E. W. Mason's 1902 novel of the same name. The film was made on location and at Cricklewood Studios by Stoll Pictures, at the time the largest British film studio. It was the second film version of the story, following a 1915 American film. The film was shot on location in North Africa. It was reasonably successful on its release.

== Synopsis ==
When a British army officer, Harry Faversham, resigns his commission on the eve of his regiment's departure for service in the Sudan he is sent four white feathers of cowardice by his comrades and fiancée. In an attempt to redeem himself, Faversham travels out to the Sudan where he saves the lives of his former comrades.

== Cast ==
- Harry Ham as Harry Faversham
- Mary Massart as Ethne Eustace
- Cyril Percival as Jack Durrance
- Henry Vibart as General Faversham
- Tony Fraser as Abou Fatma
- Ernest Robert Maling English as Lieutenant Sutch
- Harry Worth as Major Willoughby
- Gwen Williams as Mrs. Adair
- M. Gray Murray as Dermond Eustace
- C. W. Cundell as Lieutenant Trench
- Roger Livesey as Harry as a child

== Bibliography ==
- Low, Rachael. History of the British Film, 1918-1929. George Allen & Unwin, 1971.
