= The Four Feathers (2002 film) =

2002 film by Shekhar Kapur

- Theatrical release poster
- Directed by: Shekhar Kapur
- Screenplay by: Michael Schiffer; Hossein Amini
- Based on: The Four Feathers; 1902 novel by A. E. W. Mason
- Produced by: Paul Feldsher; Robert Jaffe; Stanley R. Jaffe; Marty Katz
- Starring: Heath Ledger; Wes Bentley; Kate Hudson; Djimon Hounsou; Michael Sheen
- Cinematography: Robert Richardson
- Edited by: Steven Rosenblum
- Music by: James Horner
- Production companies: Miramax Films; Jaffilms; High Command Productions Ltd.
- Distributed by: Paramount Pictures (United States); Miramax International (International) (Note: Since the acquisition of Miramax by ViacomCBS (now Paramount Skydance), Paramount owns the worldwide rights to the movie.)
- Release date: 20 September 2002
- Running time: 131 minutes
- Countries: United Kingdom; United States
- Language: English
- Budget: $35 million
- Box office: $29 million

The Four Feathers is a 2002 epic war drama film directed by Shekhar Kapur and starring Heath Ledger, Wes Bentley, Djimon Hounsou and Kate Hudson. Set during the British Army's Gordon Relief Expedition (late 1884 to early 1885) in Sudan, well after the formation of Mahdiyya, it tells the story of a young man accused of cowardice. This film, with altered plot events, is the latest in a long line of cinematic adaptations of the 1902 novel The Four Feathers by A.E.W. Mason. Other versions of the story have been set in the 1890s, with different battle events. It was roughly based on the White Feather Campaign during World War I. The Four Feathers was released on 20 September 2002 by Paramount Pictures in the United States and by Miramax International in international markets. The film received mixed reviews from critics and grossed $29 million against a $35 million budget.

== Plot ==
Harry Faversham, a young British officer completing his training, celebrates his engagement to Ethne Eustace in a ball with his fellow officers and father. When the Colonel announces that the regiment is being dispatched to Egyptian-ruled Sudan to rescue the British General Charles "Chinese" Gordon, young Faversham has serious reservations about going to war, and resigns his commission. Harry's father disowns him. Perceiving his resignation as cowardice, three of his friends and his fiancée each give him a white feather, the symbol of cowardice. Ethne breaks off their engagement.

Harry learns that his best friend Jack and his former regiment have come under attack by rebels. Undertaking the perilous journey into the Sudan alone, he strikes up an alliance with Abou Fatma, a mercenary warrior. Harry disguises himself as an Arab. Harry and Abou Fatma follow a group of army workers he believes to be spies of self-proclaimed Mahdi, Muhammad Ahmad, and reach the garrison of Abu-Klea, which they realise has been overrun. Harry begs Abou Fatma to warn his friends that their destination is under siege and an attack is likely.

The regiment stops its march to bury a group of British killed by the Mahdi. Abou Fatma is captured by Egyptian soldiers; believing he is an enemy scout, they bring him before the British officers. He tells the British that he has been sent by a British officer to warn them of the Mahdi's attack. He says that Muslims always bury their dead and that of the enemy, but that these bodies have been left to keep the British occupied. Faversham's comrades are worried, but ultimately they disregard Abou Fatma's warnings and he is flogged as a suspected spy.

The British and Egyptian troops are not prepared for battle. The Mahdi rebels attack with spearmen, riflemen and cavalry, while the British forces form a defensive square. Firing volley after volley, the British repel the initial Mahdi assault just as they spot British cavalry reinforcements in their distinctive red uniforms. A force of cavalry is sent to pursue the retreating Sudanese, but they are ambushed by Mahdi rebels and forced to fight on foot. Soon the British discover that the cavalry who they thought were reinforcements are Sudanese disguised in British uniforms. Among them is Faversham. The British square reorganises and fires a few volleys, in the process killing several survivors of the ambushed cavalry who have not yet returned to the square, including Edward Castleton, who had earlier given Harry a feather. Jack attempts to rescue Castleton in the process but is blinded when his rifle misfires. The British issue an order for retreat.

Harry finds Jack during the battle and protects him after he was blinded. Harry finds letters from Ethne to Jack, but cares for his friend without identifying himself. Never knowing his rescuer, Jack is transported to England. He asks Ethne to marry him, but she does not answer and discusses it with Harry's father.

Tom, another officer, arrives to tell Jack that Harry had visited him in Sudan. During the encounter, Harry confirms that he had sent Abou to alert the British of the Mahdi attack, and is bitter that his friends ignored the warning. Abou tells Harry that he believes Trench lives on in the notorious Mahdi prison of Omdurman. Upon learning this, Harry says he is determined to rescue him. Abou advises Harry against this venture, which is all but certain to lead to his death. Undeterred, Harry allows himself to be captured and imprisoned at Omdurman.

In the prison, Harry finds Trench. They suffer greatly as they are starved and subjected to hard labor. After a failed escape attempt, they concede the hopelessness of their situation. Later Abou rescues Harry and Trench by giving them a poison to fake their deaths. A suspicious guard follows the removal of the bodies, along with three other guards. Harry and Abou kill the four. Abou returns to the desert, and Harry escorts Trench back to Britain. Harry is acknowledged by his father and Ethne reclaims her feather, as Harry has proven his bravery. She has become engaged to Jack.

Jack learns that Harry was his rescuer when he touches Harry's face; Jack releases Ethne from their engagement. After a ceremony of remembrance, Harry and Ethne hold hands and are engaged again.

== Cast ==
- Heath Ledger as Harry Faversham
- Wes Bentley as Jack Durrance
- Kate Hudson as Ethne Eustace
- Djimon Hounsou as Abou Fatma
- Rupert Penry-Jones as Tom Willoughby
- Kris Marshall as Edward Castleton
- Michael Sheen as William Trench
- Alex Jennings as Colonel Hamilton
- James Cosmo as Colonel Sutch
- Angela Douglas as Aunt Mary
- Tim Pigott-Smith as General Faversham
- Lucy Gordon as Isabelle
- James Hillier as Drunken Corporal

== Production ==
Three supporting artists were injured when a horse bolted on a set during filming in Greenwich. Kate Hudson turned down the role of Mary Jane Watson in Spider-Man (2002) to star in the film.

== Release ==
The film opened in North American cinemas on 20 September 2002 and grossed $6,857,879 in its opening weekend, making number 5 at the US box office. The Four Feathers ended up making $29.8 million worldwide, failing to bring back its $35 million budget.

== Reception ==
The Four Feathers received mixed reviews from critics. On the review aggregator website Rotten Tomatoes, the film holds a 42% approval rating, based on 150 reviews, with an average rating of 5.4/10. The website's consensus reads, "Though beautiful to look at, The Four Feathers lacks epic excitement and suffers from an ambivalent viewpoint." On Metacritic, the film has a score of 49 out of 100 based on 32 critics, indicating "mixed or average reviews". Audiences polled by CinemaScore gave the film an average grade of "B+" on an A+ to F scale.

== See also ==
- The Four Feathers book (1902)
- The Four Feathers (1939)
- White Feather Campaign
- Storm Over the Nile (1955)
- Khartoum, a 1966 film dealing with the events leading up to General Gordon's death
- Highclere Castle
