= The Four Feathers (1978 film) =

1978 British TV film

- DVD cover
- Genre: Adventure; Drama; Romance; War
- Based on: The Four Feathers by A. E. W. Mason
- Written by: Gerald Di Pego
- Directed by: Don Sharp
- Starring: Beau Bridges; Jane Seymour; Robert Powell; Simon Ward; Harry Andrews
- Music by: Allyn Ferguson
- Country of origin: United Kingdom
- Original language: English

Production
- Executive producer: Robert D. Cardona
- Producer: Norman Rosemont
- Production locations: Wiltshire, England; Hampshire, England; Almería, Spain
- Cinematography: John Coquillon
- Editor: Eric Boyd-Perkins
- Running time: 100 minutes
- Production companies: Norman Rosemont Productions; Trident Films

Original release
- Network: NBC
- Release: January 1, 1978

The Four Feathers is a 1978 British television film adaptation of the classic 1902 novel The Four Feathers by novelist A. E. W. Mason. Directed by Don Sharp, this version starred Beau Bridges, Robert Powell, Simon Ward and Jane Seymour, and was nominated for a Primetime Emmy Award. The response to the film was very positive.

== Plot ==
Lieutenant Harry Faversham (Beau Bridges) is the latest scion of a prominent military family. A deeply sensitive boy, he is much traumatised by the early death of his kind-hearted mother. Though he never wants to be a soldier, he feels obliged to join the Army. Though no coward (as he will later show), he has no interest in an army career. Having met and become engaged to Ethne, he decides to resign his commission. The fact that war in the Sudan is coming is irrelevant to this decision. During their engagement ball on the final day of his Army career, Faversham receives telegrams summoning him and three of his brother officers (Durrance, Willoughby and Trench) back to the regiment prior to being sent to the Sudan. As determined as ever to leave the Army, Faversham burns the telegrams so that he can pretend not to have been summoned back to the regiment before his commission expires. Willoughby sees him burning papers and notices that he is embarrassed to have been taken by surprise in doing so.

Upon return to barracks Durrance, Willoughby and Trench are told they have returned 2 days late and that telegrams had been sent. Willoughby realises what Harry was doing and tells his 2 comrades who immediately assume Harry is a coward and destroyed the telegrams out of fear and to prevent himself from being sent off with the regiment. All 3 decide to issue three white feathers with their calling cards, betokening cowardice. When Faversham receives the cards Ethne pressures him to confess his earlier foolish action and she unfortunately assumes he is a coward and issues him with a white feather of her own. Their engagement broken, Harry turns to his father and in spite of explaining his actions his father casts him out when he finds out what he has done.

Harry determines to right the wrong his former friends have done to him. He journeys to the Sudan and with the help of an ally he disguises himself as an Arab. He decides that he will save each of his 3 friends and prove his bravery and in so doing they will take back their white feather and his name will be saved. He learns of an impending attack on the regiment, and tries to make it in time to save them.

During the battle, his closest friend Captain Jack Durrance becomes engaged in close combat, during which he is blinded when a black-powder rifle goes off next to his face. Harry attacks the Arabs who surround Durrance rescuing him. He helps Durrance to escape and he recuperates in a military hospital but learns that he is now permanently blind. Durrance has struck up a relationship with Ethne and she writes to the stricken Jack telling him that while she walked out on Harry she intends to be by his side and agrees to marry him.

Next on Harry's list is Willoughby who he follows as he leaves the safety of his barracks. Willoughby enters an unsafe area and the disguised Harry watches over him. In a bar as Willoughby is about to be stabbed, Harry yells a warning and intervenes. The two men fight off a gang and Willoughby is saved. Harry hands Willoughby his white feather and instructs him to return it to Ethne before disappearing. Willoughby returns to England and approaches Ethne regaling her with the story of Harry's bravery. Ethne then realises, that Harry must have also rescued Jack and tells Harry's father. The old man is thankful that their family name is being restored.

Last on the list is Trench who has been captured by the Arabs and imprisoned in the Dervish prison. Harry gets himself imprisoned and over time exposes himself to Trench and the two come up with an escape plan. As they escape the sick Trench tells Harry to kill him, should they be recaptured. They manage to fend off an attack of Arabs and escape back to Cairo where Harry hands Trench his feather.

Meanwhile in England a butler reads the news of Trench's escape to Jack. It is also disclosed that Harry was the one who aided and abetted Trench's escape. Jack decides he cannot marry Ethne as she loves Harry, so he concocts a plan to lie to her that his sight is returning and he needs to leave her for treatment in Germany. He frees her from their engagement and leaves.

Harry returns to England and confronts his cold father, who finally tells Harry that he has redeemed the family name. Harry tells his father he turned down a captaincy in the army and that any future children will not take up a military career. The older man finally respects his son and they reconcile, agreeing to get to know one another. Trench then visits Ethne and directs her to Harry where they both embrace as Harry returns Ethne's white feather to her.

== Cast ==
- Beau Bridges as Harry Faversham
- Robert Powell as Jack Durrance
- Simon Ward as William Trench
- Jane Seymour as Ethne Eustace
- Harry Andrews as General Faversham
- Richard Johnson as Abou Fatma
- David Robb as Thomas Willoughby
- Richard Beale as Wembol (valet)
- Robin Bailey as Colonel Eustace
- John Hallam as Sergeant Major
- Julian Barnes as Lieutenant Bradley
- Mary Maude as Mrs Faversham
- Frank Gatliff as Old Major
- Robert Flemyng as Old Colonel
- Robert James as John (the butler)

== Production ==
=== Development ===
The film was produced by Norman Rosemont, who specialised in making adaptations of classic tales for television. He had recently made The Man in the Iron Mask, Captains Courageous and The Count of Monte Cristo. The films would be made for over $1 million which was more than US networks would pay for them, but they could be released theatrically overseas. "The great classic authors wrote good stories with strong plots about people you could care for", said Rosemont. "And filming them at length – usually three hours – you can get most of the plot in."

The Four Feathers was, like Captains Courageous, a Bell special for the ABC (i.e. it was sponsored by Bell Systems). Part of the money was provided by Trident Films, an off-shot of Trident Television, a Leeds-based regional television group.

Norman Rosemont normally filmed works in the public domain but he had to pay London Films $150,000 for the rights to Four Feathers. London Films had made movie versions of the novel in 1939 and 1956.

Director Don Sharp was best known for his action films. He had been working on several feature film projects that failed to raise finance when he was offered the job of directing The Four Feathers; Sharp was initially reluctant to do a remake but liked the script and had a very positive experience.

The casting of Powell and Bridges was announced in July 1977. Bridges had a dialect coach, Robert Easton, to help him with the accent.

=== Shooting ===
Filming started in August 1977 and took place in England and Spain. The Duke of Wellington's estate was used for English scenes. The desert sequences were shot in Almería, Spain over three weeks. During the Spanish part of filming, Powell referred to occasions when the unit was affected by sandstorms, saying, "Everyone wore surgical masks and goggles and was covered from head to foot, except the bloody actors".

Sharp enjoyed working with Beau Bridges and Robert Powell. He had a more difficult relationship with producer Norman Rosemont, who Sharp said would get paranoid and argumentative. Sharp did greatly respect Rosemont's story skills and showmanship.

Richard Johnson had just made Hennessy with Sharp; he appeared in Four Feathers in blackface.

== Release ==
The film premiered on US television on 1 January 1978. It was released theatrically in England on 28 February 1978.

== Reception ==
=== Critical ===
The Los Angeles Times praised it as "a large, sumptuous movie in the grand, romantic tradition... staged with fine sweep and power by Don Sharp from a meticulous adaptation". The Christian Science Monitor called it "rollicking entertainment."

A New York Times reviewer wrote: "Mr. Bridges is quite effective as the bearded adventurer, and the action scenes are jolly good, if you will. 'Four Feathers' may possibly be the bloodiest pacifist lesson ever devised, but its grand posturing and silly sentiments work nicely."

The Monthly Film Bulletin called it "a museum piece, brought up from the vaults, dusted down and carefully mounted."

The Evening Standard called it "a distinctly compact version" in which it was "difficult to see the attraction of casting Beau Bridges as the hero."

"What right has it to exist at all," asked The Observer.

=== Ratings ===
The film was the 28th highest rated show of the week on American television.
