= The Two and a Half Feathers =

- Dad's Army episode
- Episode no.: Series 4 Episode 8
- Directed by: David Croft
- Story by: Jimmy Perry and David Croft
- Original air date: 13 November 1970
- Running time: 30 minutes

Episode chronology
← Previous "Put That Light Out!"	Next → "Mum's Army"

"The Two and a Half Feathers" is the eighth episode of the fourth series of the British sitcomedy series Dad's Army. It was originally transmitted on Friday 13 November 1970.

== Synopsis ==
New platoon member George Clarke reveals that he served with Jones in the Sudan and questions the Lance Corporal's service record.

== Plot ==
It is lunchtime in Walmington-on-Sea. Mainwaring, Wilson and Pike are in the British Restaurant, ordering their lunch. Wilson orders toad in the hole, and Mainwaring and Pike order the fish and potato pie, but when they find out that the fish is snoek, they soon change their minds.

The lunch menu with their prices was as follows - Soup (2 1/2d) Toad in the Hole (8d) Fish and Potato Pie (7d) Swedes and Carrots (2d) Bread Pudding with Custard (3d) Tea (1d) One slice of bread only with each mean (1/2d) No meal must cost more than 1/8d.

Walker enters and gives the dinner ladies knicker elastic in exchange for a steak.

As they sit, Jones enters in his old Sudanese uniform, and informs Mainwaring that he is off to the 42nd annual reunion for the veterans of the Battle of Omdurman. He gives Mainwaring and Wilson a gory account of the battle, spreading mothballs everywhere and putting Wilson and Mainwaring off their food. Mainwaring is even further put off when he eats one of the mothballs, which landed in Walker's pickle pot.

That evening, Frazer brings in a new recruit for the platoon, George Clarke, who is very loyal and trustworthy, as he stood Frazer several pints in the bar at The Anchor the previous Thursday. Clarke tells Mainwaring that he joined the army in 1897 and, like Jones, served at the Battle of Omdurman. Wilson and Mainwaring are shocked at the coincidence, especially when Clarke mentions that he was in the Warwickshire Regiment alongside Jones and gives an accurate description of Jones. Mainwaring decides to wait until tomorrow to see if it is the same man.

Jones arrives, tired, the next evening, and Frazer, Pike and Walker follow him into the office, where Godfrey is fitting Clarke with his uniform. Clarke immediately recognises Jones and seems very civil until his tone of voice turns hostile. Mainwaring quickly organises the parade, and Frazer announces his suspicions about their relationship.

Later, Frazer rings someone on the telephone and tells them that after a couple of pints, Clarke told him that he and Jones were captured by the "Fuzzy Wuzzies". He then told Frazer that Jones managed to escape and left Clarke to die. The rumour soon spreads, and Walker is torn between his friendship with Frazer and his friendship with Jones.

Jones, meanwhile, receives malicious letters that contain two and a half white feathers, and saying that he should not have left Clarke in the desert, and that Walmington-on-Sea is "no place for a coward". Jones has had enough and leaves on a mysterious errand. As he leaves, he says to his assistant "I've got to do something I should have done a long time ago. I've got to do it, it's the only way."

At the next parade, Mainwaring is determined to get to the bottom of the incident. Clarke tells Mainwaring that they were captured and Jones begged for mercy, and after he allegedly left Clarke in the desert, a native rescued him. Clarke remarks the native must have saved his life, even if he did pinch his wallet. Jones creeps into the office and tells the true story of what happened (this is shown as a flashback to Sudan in 1898 where the Dad's Army characters play similar characters in Jones's story).

Jones explains that a few days before the Battle of Omdurman, he and Clarke were part of a patrol sent out by General Kitchener to find out the strength of the Mahdi's army. It was led by Colonel Smythe (Wilson), with a young raw second Lieutenant called Franklin (Pike), who was the Colonel's nephew. There was also Sergeant Ironside (Mainwaring), "a nasty, coarse fellow who kept giving us the rough side of his tongue", and a young merry joking Cockney, Private Green (Walker).

As they travelled through the desert, they met an old fakir (Godfrey), who warned them that when the sun sets, they would all be dead. When Ironside gave him "a mouthful of coarse abuse", the fakir was outraged and said something to them in Arabic. Jones did not understand it at the time, but later he learned "it was a curse upon us all".

Suddenly, a fusillade of shots rang out, and the patrol were quick to respond. They took cover behind a large rocky hill and an enemy cavalry charge began. When Franklin was injured after falling off his horse, Smythe suggested that two men should go for help. Jones volunteered, and Smythe told him to take Private Clarke with him. By morning, their water bottles were empty. They stopped for a rest and were captured by two Dervishes (Frazer and Hodges). Jones was about to attack when Clarke begged for mercy. They pegged him out in the desert and took Jones with them.

When the Dervishes stopped and began to cook a meal, they had an argument and started fighting between each other, giving Jones the chance to free himself. One of the Dervishes ran off, and the other (Hodges) was scared by a burning branch that Jones thrust in his face, and the Dervish begged him, in Arabic, to "put that light out" (which is Hodges' catchphrase in real life). Jones put on his robes and took his horse. By the time he returned, Clarke was unconscious from the heat and thirst. Carrying him on his horse, they met up with a large relief column.

Returning to the present, Jones says that Clarke was sent to a military hospital and he never saw him again. Mainwaring is puzzled as to why Jones did not tell them the truth before. Jones reveals that when he returned to Clarke, he thought he was dead. Whilst searching through Clarke's wallet to send home among his personal effects, Jones found a photograph of the Colonel's wife, meaning that Clarke and she had been having an affair. Jones tells them that he could not have told them this before for fear of slurring the Colonel's name.

Jones reveals he has recently been at Somerset House in London and now knows that the Colonel and his wife are dead, so he could tell all, and burn the letters that she and Clarke sent to each other. Mainwaring is upset that Jones has been treated as a coward and is incensed at Clarke, so he decides to confront him. Upset for their treatment of Jones as well, the platoon is also angry at Clarke. However, Wilson reveals that Clarke went outside. As they go after him, Hodges arrives, and tells them that Clarke has resigned and left by train and will post his uniform back. Jones proceeds to burn the letters with Walker's cigarette lighter, and Hodges screams at him to "put that light out".

== Cast ==
- Arthur Lowe as Captain Mainwaring and Sergeant Ironside
- John Le Mesurier as Sergeant Wilson and Colonel Smythe
- Clive Dunn as Lance Corporal Jones
- John Laurie as Private Frazer and Dervish warrior
- James Beck as Private Walker and Private Green
- Arnold Ridley as Private Godfrey and the Old Fakir
- Ian Lavender as Private Pike and Second Lieutenant Franklin
- Bill Pertwee as ARP Warden Hodges and Dervish warrior
- John Cater as Private Clarke
- Wendy Richard as Edith
- Queenie Watts as Edna
- Gilda Perry as Doreen
- Linda James as Betty
- Parnell McGarry as Elizabeth
- John Ash as Raymond

== Notes ==
- The title is a play on the novel and subsequent films entitled The Four Feathers, in which a member of the British Army in the Sudan is accused of cowardice. In the 1939 film The Four Feathers, the Khalifa was played by John Laurie.
- The historical flashback scenes were filmed in a disused Norfolk quarry, rigged up to look like the Sudanese desert, interspersed with footage from the 1939 film version of The Four Feathers.
- This was one of two episodes where the Dad's Army characters were rather whimsically shown in a historical setting; the other was A Soldier's Farewell.
- During the flashback scenes, there is a rare opportunity to see Clive Dunn without the heavy makeup which he wore to play Lance Corporal Jones, who was much older than Dunn was in reality.
