= Howard Estabrook =

American actor

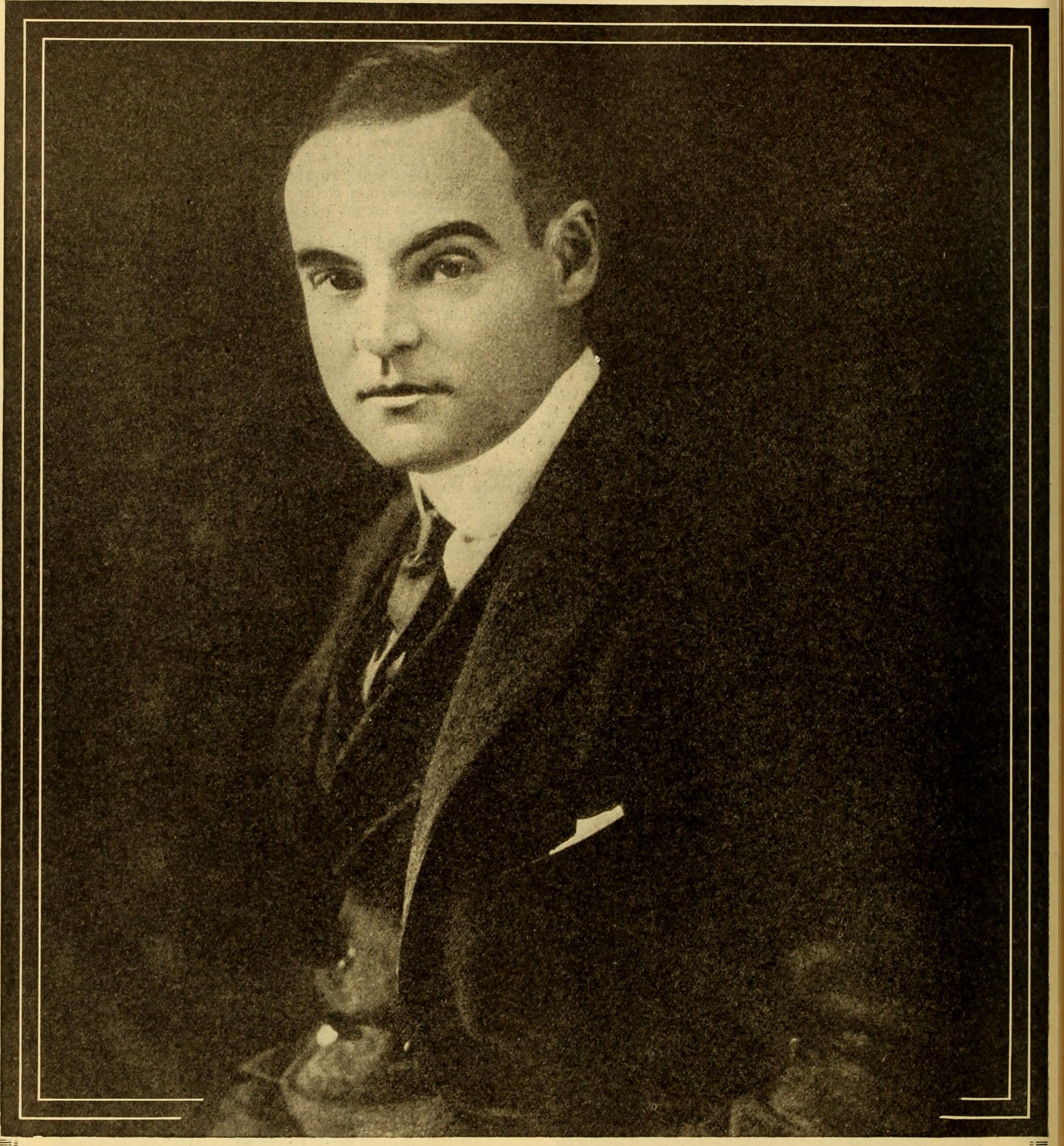
- Born: Howard Bolles; July 11, 1884; Detroit, Michigan
- Died: July 16, 1978 (aged 94); Woodland Hills, Los Angeles, California
- Occupations: Actor, director, producer, screenwriter
- Years active: 1904–1959

Howard Estabrook (née Bolles, July 11, 1884 – July 16, 1978) was an American actor, film director and producer, and screenwriter.

== Biography ==
Born Howard Bolles in Detroit, Michigan, Howard Estabrook began his career in 1904 as a stage actor in New York. He made his film debut in 1914 during the silent era, and would go on to appear in several features including Four Feathers. Estabrook left films in 1916 for a try at the business world, but returned in 1921.

Estabrook took on executive positions with various studios, and eventually began producing films in 1924. He soon found his calling in screenwriting. He was responsible for several of what have come to be regarded as classics of Hollywood including Hell's Angels (1930) and Street of Chance (1930), for which he was nominated for an Academy Award. The following year, he won an Academy Award for Best Adapted Screenplay for Cimarron, starring Richard Dix and Irene Dunne. In 1935, he (along with Hugh Walpole and Lenore J. Coffee) adapted the Charles Dickens novel David Copperfield for the 1935 film version starring W. C. Fields and Lionel Barrymore.

Estabrook continued in his screenwriting career for three decades, as well as directing and producing films before his death on July 16, 1978, in Woodland Hills, Los Angeles, California.

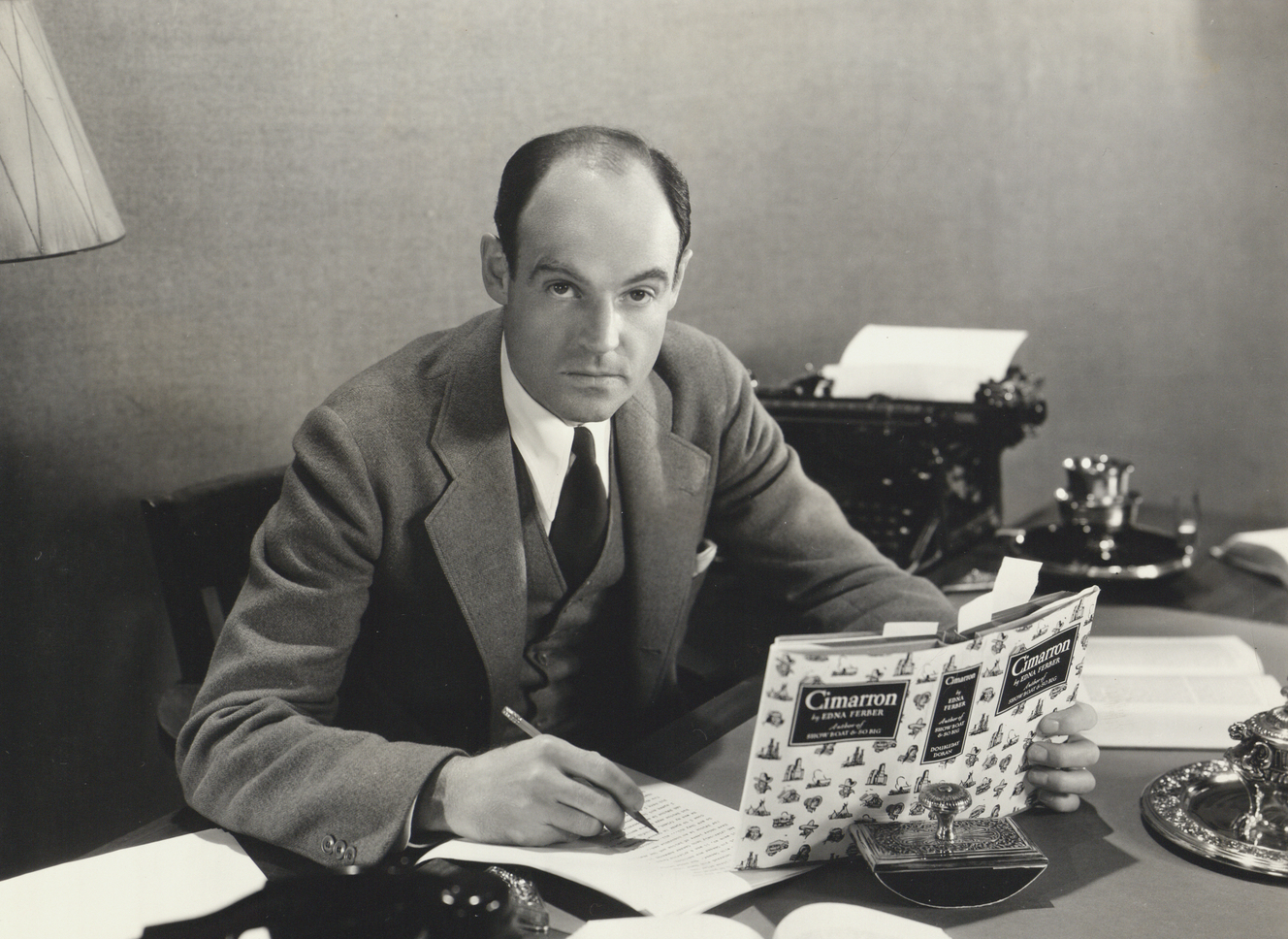

== Selected filmography ==
Film
Year	Film	Role	Notes
1914	Officer 666	Travers Gladwin	
1915	M'Liss	John Gray	
1916	The Mysteries of Myra	Dr. Payson Alden	
1917	Giving Becky a Chance	-	Director
1924	The Price of a Party	-	Producer
1925	North Star	-	Producer
1928	The Shopworn Angel	-	Writer
1928	Forgotten Faces		Writer
1929	The Four Feathers	-	Writer
1930	The Bad Man	-	Writer
1930	Slightly Scarlet		Writer
1931	Are These Our Children?	-	Adaptation and dialogue Director (Uncredited)
1932	A Bill of Divorcement	-	Screenplay
1933	The Bowery	-	Writer
1935	Way Down East	-	Writer
1937	Wells Fargo	-	Producer
1938	The Cowboy and the Lady	-	Contributing writer, uncredited
1943	The Human Comedy	-	Writer
1944	The Bridge of San Luis Rey	-	Adaptation, screenplay
1945	Dakota	-	Adaptation
1946	The Virginian	-	Adaptation
1948	The Girl from Manhattan	-	Screenplay, story
1952	Lone Star	-	Story
1954	Cattle Queen of Montana	-	Screenplay
1959	The Big Fisherman	-	Writer
Television
Year	Title	Role	Notes
1958	The Millionaire	-	Writer, 1 episode
1959	DuPont Show of the Month	-	Writer, 1 episode

== Awards and nominations ==
Year	Award	Category	Nominated work	Result
1930	3rd Academy Awards	Best Adapted Screenplay	Street of Chance	Nominated
1931	4th Academy Awards	Best Adapted Screenplay	Cimarron	Won
