= Should a Mother Tell? =

Should A Mother Tell?
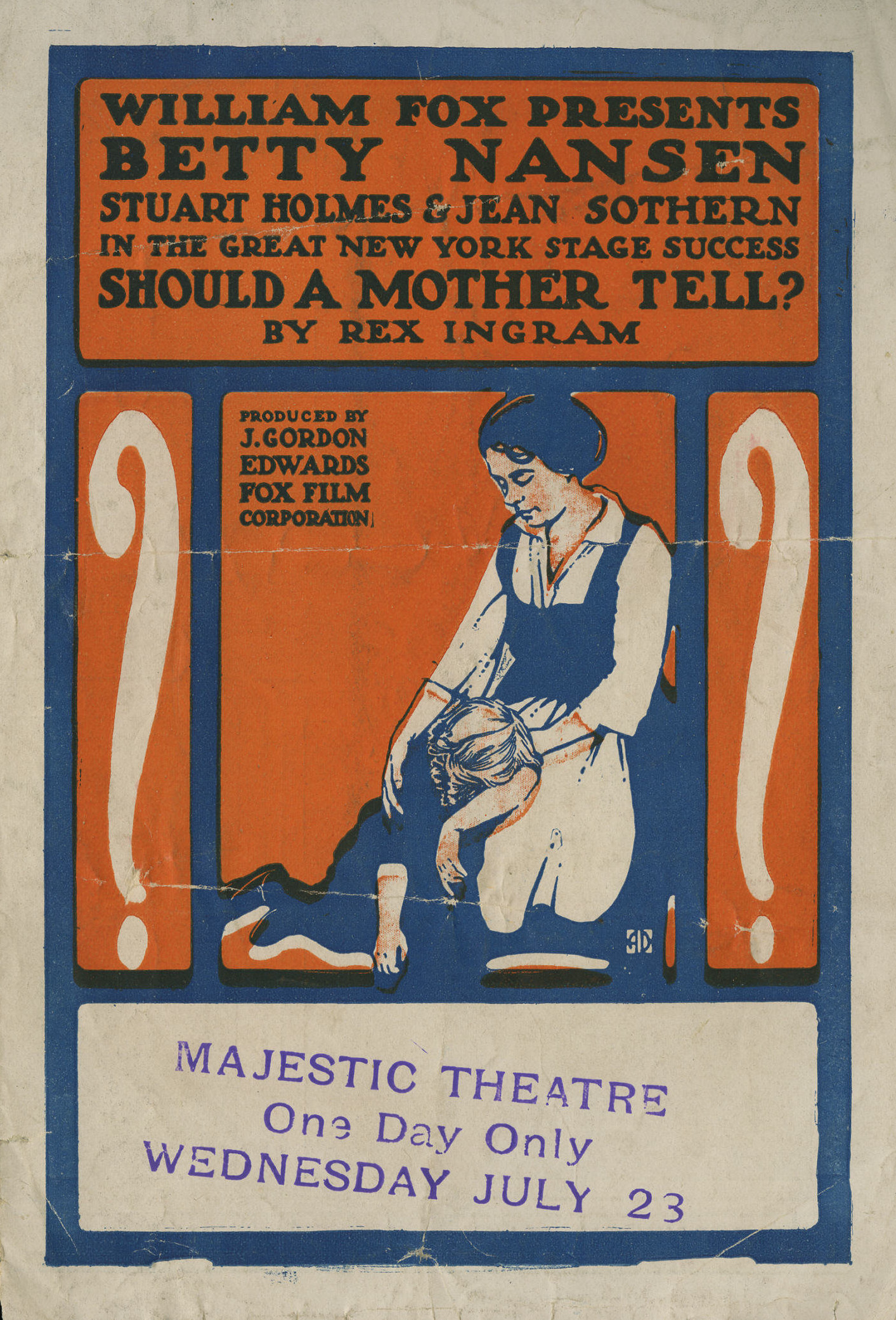
- Front of a flyer for the film
- Directed by: J. Gordon Edwards
- Written by: Rex Ingram
- Produced by: William Fox
- Starring: Betty Nansen
- Cinematography: Frank Kugler
- Distributed by: Fox Film Corporation
- Release date: July 1915
- Running time: 5 reels
- Country: USA
- Language: Silent..English titles
- Budget: $18,277

Should A Mother Tell? is a lost 1915 silent film drama directed by J. Gordon Edwards and starring Betty Nansen. The scenario was by future director Rex Ingram with the film being produced and distributed by Fox Film Corporation.

== Plot ==
Marie Baudin keeps her silence in the murder of Baron Gauntier, which she has witnessed at the hands of her despicable, greedy husband, Gaspard. Convinced by Gaspard that the truth would ruin their daughter Pamela's chances to marry her childhood lover, Louis Brassard, Marie keeps her silence even when tortured by the prefect of police. However, as the wrongfully accused Philippe Montsorel is led to the guillotine, Marie reveals Gaspard as the real murderer. In order to escape his punishment, Gaspard jumps to his death. Pamela is then free to marry Louis.

== Cast ==
- Betty Nansen - Marie Baudin
- Stuart Holmes - Gaspard Baudin
- Jean Sothern - Pamela Baudin age 16
- Arthur Hoops - Baron Gauntier
- Claire Whitney - Baroness Gauntier
- Ivean Linden - Phillip Montsorel
- Stephen Grattan - Monsieur Brassard
- Grace Everett - Madame Brassard
- Kate Blancke - Countess de Montsorel
- George Baldwin - Louis Brassard age 20
- Henry Leone - Prefect of Police
- Jack Ivra Rollins - Raoul
- Ralph Johnston - Louis Brassard age 8
- Runa Hodges - Pamela Baudin age 5
