= Jean Sothern =

American actress

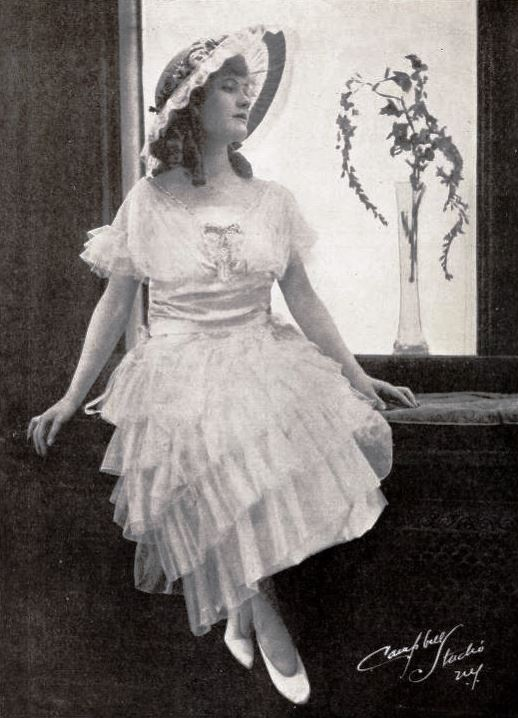
- Jean Sothern in 1916
- Born: December 5, 1893; Philadelphia, Pennsylvania, U.S.
- Died: April 14, 1964 (aged 70); Lancaster, Pennsylvania, U.S.
- Occupation: Actress

Jean Sothern (December 5, 1893 – April 14, 1964) was an American actress in silent films, vaudeville, and radio. She had leading roles in silent films and became popular before World War I.

== Life and career ==
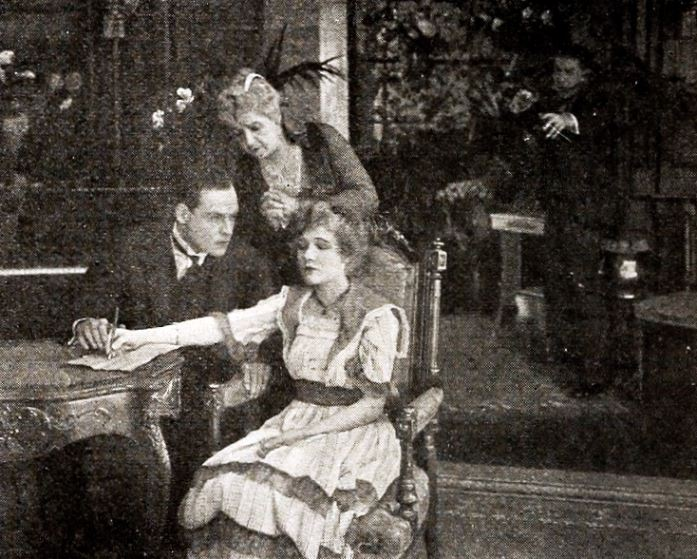
Still from The Mysteries of Myra

Sothern was born on December 5, 1893, in Philadelphia, Pennsylvania.

Sothern starred alongside Theda Bara in the 1915 silent film, The Two Orphans, as one of the title characters. It was followed by her well known portrayal of the character of Myra on the film serial The Mysteries of Myra.

In 1930, Sothern auditioned with Columbia Broadcasting to perform with their dramatic radio department. On radio, Sothern was heard regularly on Majestic Theater of the Air and played Katie on Robinson Crusoe, Jr.

Sothern died from esophageal cancer in Lancaster, Pennsylvania on April 14, 1964. (Note: Variety erroneously reported that she had died of cancer in 1924, confusing her with another woman.)

== Filmography ==
- Dr. Rameau (1915)
- The Two Orphans (1915), as Louise
- Should a Mother Tell? (1915), as Pamela Baudin
- The Mysteries of Myra (1916), a serial, as Myra Maynard
- Miss Deception (1917)
- A Mother's Ordeal (1917)
- Peg o' the Sea (1918), as Peg
