= Street of Chance (1930 film) =

1930 film

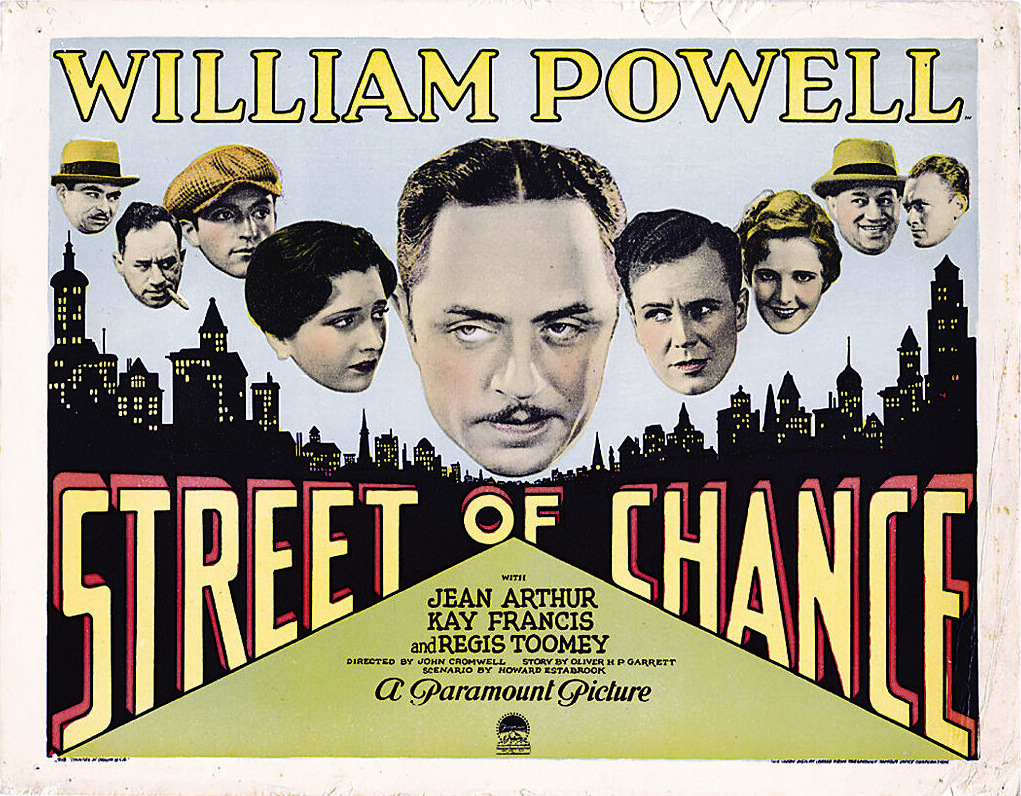
- Lobby card
- Directed by: John Cromwell
- Written by: Oliver H.P. Garrett (story); Lenore J. Coffee; Howard Estabrook; Ben Hecht (uncredited); Charles MacArthur (uncredited); Gerald Geraghty (titles)
- Produced by: David O. Selznick
- Starring: William Powell; Jean Arthur; Kay Francis
- Cinematography: Charles Lang
- Edited by: Otho Lovering
- Music by: John Leipold (uncredited)
- Distributed by: Paramount Pictures
- Release date: February 8, 1930
- Running time: 76 minutes
- Country: United States
- Language: English

Street of Chance is a 1930 American pre-Code crime drama film directed by John Cromwell and starring William Powell, Jean Arthur, Kay Francis and Regis Toomey. Howard Estabrook was nominated for the Academy Award for Best Writing, Achievement.

== Plot ==
Wealthy bond broker John Marsden is actually “Natural Davis” a famed and powerful New York gambler with strict standards—he never “cheats, frames or double-crosses,” and “it's final for those who do”. He is devoted to his wife, Alma, who is filing for a legal separation, and to his impressionable younger brother, "Babe” who has shaken a gambling problem and just married Judy. John sends Babe a wedding gift of $10,000, telling him to put it into good bonds, but Babe plans to run it up to $150,000.

Driven to despair by John's obsession with gambling, Alma plans to leaves the city that night. John has an important floating crap game with Dorgan, a high-rolling bootlegger from Detroit. He plans to see her afterward. At the game, John exposes Al Mastic as a cheater. Al offers to pay everything back, but that is not good enough. He is found dead.

That evening, Babe comes to town with his new bride, eager to see his brother, the prosperous stockbroker who has supported him all his life.

John meets with Alma, who is wearied with the uncertainty and danger of being a gambler's wife. The wealth means nothing to her. He claims that their 6 months separation has made him think. He agrees to quit and leave with her on the first train in the morning, for a second honeymoon.

On Times Square, Babe—who has been tipped off by his San Francisco gambling contacts—asks paperseller Tony where to find Natural Davis. John is horrified to see his brother, who thinks this is a chance meeting. Full of his success turning the $10,000 into $50,000 shooting craps, he has come to the city to play “Natural Davis and that mob”, not realizing “Natural” is his brother. Babe has a naive view of gamblers, singing the praises of Davis, despite John's warnings: “It won’t look so easy to you someday when you’ve got to knock some guy off or take one in the belly yourself.” John insists on taking the $10,000 back before putting Babe in the game. He plans to teach Babe a lesson by cleaning him out. He asks Dorgan to run the game.

John goes to Judy and tells her his plans. He warns her that if Babe wins heavily, the other gamblers will not let him stop. He'll be called a Welsher. He describes the suffering of a gambler's wife, making her promise to take Babe home. He gives her the $10,000.

Meanwhile, Babe has had incredible luck. A furious Dorgan, thinking he's been double crossed, leaves the game to scour the streets looking for “Natural”. Tony finds John at Alma's apartment. John tells Alma everything, promising to catch the noon train, but she doesn't believe him. He leaves her weeping.

At the poker game, Babe reveals that he and John are brothers. Dorgan wants his money back. “You'll play until one of us is broke.” John tells Babe, but Babe's luck continues, until the last pot. Babe grabs John's hand and exposes a palmed Ace. Disgusted, he storms out. John cannot explain that he was trying to make his brother lose. He promises to pay everyone, but Dorgan tells him he must live—and die—by the rules, as Mastic did.

John calls Judy and tells her Babe is not broke, but he is cured. At the hotel, he is told that Alma canceled their tickets and left.

On the Westbound train, Babe resists the temptation to join a card game and embraces Judy.

On the street, the word is out that John is “on the spot”. Informants and “friends” ignore him, but loyal Tony tells Alma to get him out of town, They call all over, leaving messages.

At the speakeasy, John receives a farewell telegram from Judy, and then a message, supposedly from Babe, telling him to come to the Holland House.

Cut to the Holland House. John staggers downstairs, wounded in the side. In the ambulance, he refuses to say who shot him. He opens a message: “Call your wife,” The kind ambulance attendant bets him that he will be okay. “You lose,” John says, and dies.

== Cast ==
- William Powell as John D. Marsden
- Jean Arthur as Judith Marsden
- Kay Francis as Alma Marsden
- Regis Toomey as "Babe" Marsden
- Stanley Fields as Dorgan
- Brooks Benedict as Al Mastick
- Betty Francisco as Mrs. Mastick
- John Risso as Tony
- Joan Standing as Miss Abrams
- Maurice Black as Nick
- Irving Bacon as Harry
- John Cromwell as Imbrie (uncredited)

== See also ==
- List of American films of 1930
