= White Feather Campaign =

Male shaming campaign during World War I

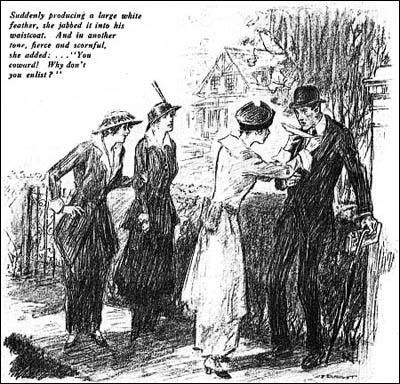
"The White Feather: A Sketch of English Recruiting" (Arnold Bennett, 1914)

The White Feather Campaign was a prominent enlistment campaign and shaming ritual in Britain during the First World War, in which women gave white feathers to non-enlisting men, symbolising cowardice and shaming them into signing up.

Although the campaign was unpopular among the public, with reports of it causing mental suffering and suicides among men, it was seen as a success by the government, with figures such as Christabel Pankhurst receiving praise, monetary grants, as well as political endorsement.

The campaign, noted for the participation of many suffragettes and early feminists in its leadership, such as Baroness Orczy, Christabel Pankhurst and Emmeline Pankhurst, is also interpreted as one of the reasons behind the passing of the Representation of the People Act 1918, which first granted franchise to land-owning women.

== Background ==
At the outset of World War I, Britain relied on voluntary enlistment. However, as the war stretched long, and Britain started running out of working-age men to death or injury, there was a shortage of troops, which prompted the government to start conscripting men in 1916, and later decreasing the age of conscription through the Military Service Act. Britain also started recruiting teenagers, with about 250,000 minors serving with the country in WW1. In August 1914, Admiral Charles Penrose-Fitzgerald founded what became known as the "Order of the White Feather". He enlisted groups of young women to hand out white feathers, a traditional symbol of cowardice, to men in civilian attire in public places. The group that he founded (with prominent members being the authors Emma Orczy and Mary Augusta Ward) was known as the White Feather Brigade or the Order of the White Feather. The Order and their recruiting methods quickly spread across Britain. Women of all backgrounds contributed their influence to the war effort. These so-called "white feather girls" combed streets, trams, theatres and other public spaces, pinning feathers onto unsuspecting young men as a public rebuke for their failure to join the military.

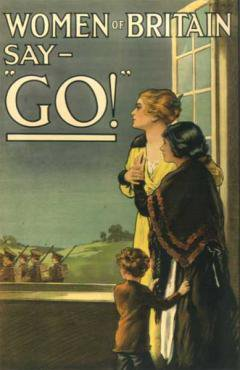
Women of Britain Say 'Go!' poster issued in 1915 by the British Parliamentary Recruiting Committee

This was part of a larger shift towards propaganda drawing heavily on themes of gender, to suggest an innocent vulnerability of mothers, wives and daughters, and to guilt men by implying they would be emasculated if they did not fight. While the propaganda was meant to persuade women to use their influence to secure more recruits, many women seized upon these appeals as license to arbitrate male behaviour and to demonstrate their own superior bravery and patriotism.

The White Feather Movement was effective in drumming up enlistment, and many men reportedly volunteered soon after being handed a feather, unable to bear the stigma. In Britain, it started to cause problems for the government when public servants and men in essential occupations came under pressure to enlist. That prompted Home Secretary Reginald McKenna to issue employees in state industries with lapel badges reading "King and Country" to indicate that they were serving the war effort.

Likewise, the Silver War Badge, which was given to service personnel who had been honourably discharged by wounds or sickness, was first issued in September 1916 to prevent veterans from being challenged for not wearing uniform. Anecdotes from the time indicate that the campaign was unpopular among soldiers, not least because soldiers who were home on leave could find themselves presented with feathers.

== Role of the suffragettes ==
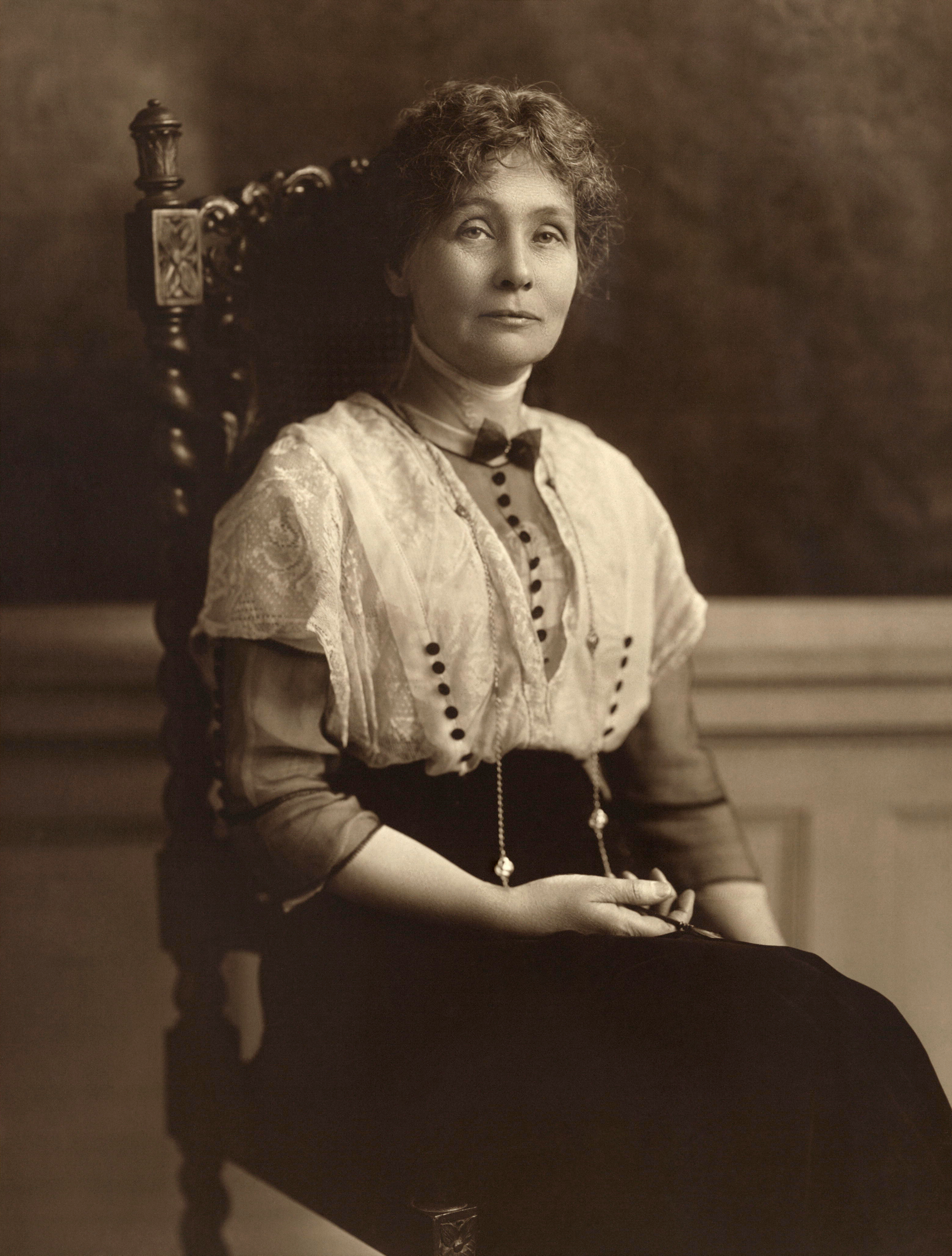
British activist Emmeline Pankhurst famously toured the country, making recruiting speeches, with her supporters handing out white feathers to every young man they encountered wearing civilian dress, and bobbed up at Hyde Park meetings with placards 'Intern Them All.'

A significant faction of British suffragettes enthusiastically embraced the war effort and the White Feather Movement, viewing them as an opportunity to demonstrate women's patriotism and claim a stake in national service. Leading the pro-war charge was Emmeline Pankhurst, the famous militant suffragette and leader of the Women's Social and Political Union (WSPU). As soon as war broke out in 1914, Emmeline and her eldest daughter Christabel Pankhurst dramatically pivoted their organisation's focus from fighting for the vote to fighting for the country. She also famously toured the country making recruiting speeches, her supporters handing out feathers.

The British government, keen to secure the support of these influential militants, released all WSPU suffragettes from prison in August 1914, effectively striking a bargain: the WSPU would suspend its suffrage agitation and devote its energies to recruiting men and mobilising women for war work. Emmeline Pankhurst declared that suffragettes must now "fight for their country as they fought for the vote", telling her followers that the struggle for women's rights would be meaningless if Britain itself were defeated. The movement also received a £2,000 grant from the government to aid in campaigning.

At a mass demonstration in 1915 billed as the "Women's Right to Serve" procession, Pankhurst led 30,000 women through London with banners encouraging men to participate in the War. Sylvia Pankhurst later recounted that during Emmeline's recruiting tours, WSPU members "handed out white feathers to every young man they encountered wearing civilian dress". According to Sylvia, WSPU enthusiasts would even appear at public meetings waving placards reading "Intern Them All", a sign of their ultra-patriotic fervour against allegedly unpatriotic men and enemy aliens. Sylvia later speculated that the WSPU's women and the unofficial white feather distributors were "one and the same."

The White feather campaign also caused a rift among the pro-war and pacifist feminists, with the National Union of Women's Suffrage Societies famously expelling its pacifist members in 1915.

The campaign was also briefly renewed for the Second World War.

== Criticism ==
In WW1-era Britain, the psychological toll of receiving a white feather was significant. Men who were unable to enlist due to medical reasons or other exemptions faced public humiliation, leading to feelings of emasculation and depression. Some men committed suicide over being medically refused for service, instead of choosing to be publicly humiliated by women who knew nothing of their situation. One notable case was Robert Greaves, who took his own life after receiving a white feather, despite being classified as unfit for military service due to a physical disability. A year later, a London taxi driver also committed suicide upon receiving a feather. About the same time, a West Middlesex coroner examining another suicide also condemned the "white feather women" for denouncing men without inquiring into the circumstances.

Some recipients of feathers were serving soldiers on leave or wounded veterans, incidents that exposed the zealotry of the campaign. Occasionally injured veterans were mistakenly targeted, such as Reuben W. Farrow who after being aggressively asked by a woman on a tram why he would not do his duty, turned around and showed his missing hand causing her to apologise. Others had completed their tour of duty, and due to the contracting of diseases such as malaria, or post-traumatic stress, did not seek to voluntarily reenlist. Letter from the Imperial War Museum also show instances where feathers were given to teenagers. For many of these boys, at an age where self-consciousness is at its height, the shame of appearing to be adult but not in uniform made them lie about their ages.

The movement often led to men leaving for the war, and never returning. One such account is that of Olive Shapley, who recalled that her seventeen-year-old brother, Frank, was confronted by a woman while out with his Scout troop. She reportedly asked, "What's a big chap like you out playing? You get out and fight", before presenting him with a white feather. Although he was below the legal age for military service, Frank enlisted in the Royal Navy that evening, and was subsequently killed at the Battle of Jutland.

In a 1986 interview with the Imperial War Museum, John Dorgan recalled that his brother Nicol, who worked in a reserved occupation as a coal miner and was therefore exempt from military service, received an anonymous white feather through the post. According to Dorgan, Nicol immediately left home to enlist in the Durham Light Infantry and was subsequently killed in France, never returning home. Dorgan also recounted that years later he encountered the woman who had sent the feather, but was unable to forgive her or confront the incident directly.

=== Incidents ===
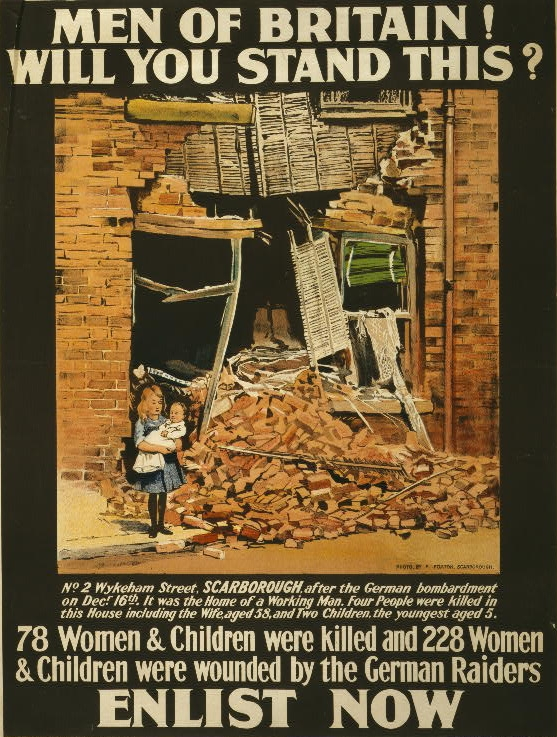
WWI recruitment poster referring to the German bombardment of Scarborough, invoking the female casualties in the war in order to coax men into enlisting

Although Admiral Fitzgerald, as well as propagandists Lord Esher and Arthur Conan Doyle urged women to shun men out of uniform, and hand out feathers, the authorities frequently showed horror when women actually practised it. In a lecture exhorting girls of the Women's League of Honour to send their men to war, Major Leonard Darwin clarified that he was "very far from admiring those women who go up to young men in the street...and abuse them for not enlisting, a proceeding which requires no courage on the woman's part, but merely a complete absence of modesty".

On more than one occasion, white feathers were handed out to teenagers, who then lied about their age to recruiters in order to join, or wanted to go but had family obligations. In World War II, in January 1942, a 17-year-old, from a family where all other members were serving, lied about his age a year earlier and was discovered and so joined the cadets, received two feathers and committed suicide; and in June 1943, an 18-year-old apprentice who was serving in the Home Guard also committed suicide after receiving a feather. Frederick Broome, who had already served at the front before being discharged, was given white feathers by four girls while crossing Putney Bridge. Embarrassed by the public humiliation, the sixteen-year-old immediately re-enlisted in the British Army. Similarly, seventeen-year-old Sebastian Lang recalled being handed a white feather in the street before a recruiting sergeant encouraged him to enlist in order to "prove" that he was not a coward.

Private Norman Demuth, who was discharged from the British Army after he had been wounded in 1916, received numerous white feathers after he returned from the Western Front. In Forgotten Voices of the Great War, Demuth recalls receiving a feather, remarking "we didn't get these in the trenches", cleaning his pipe with it, and then returning it to the woman, who sat awkwardly for the rest of the bus ride.

Another reported misplaced use of a white feather was in October 1915 when one was presented to Seaman George Samson, who was on his way in civilian clothes to a Carnoustie public reception being held in his honour for having been awarded the Victoria Cross for gallantry in the Gallipoli campaign.

White feathers were also given to pacifists, such as Fenner Brockway, founder of the No-Conscription Fellowship, who remarked he received so many white feathers that he had enough to make a fan.

== Responses ==
Both in World War I and World War II there were calls for a "badge for services rendered" that could be worn by discharged soldiers.

With World War I starting in August 1914, in Australia by November 1914 it was considered by some that the action of the "white feather brigade" was misplaced. By June 1915 in Victoria, the "Australian Patriots' League" was formed for men who had volunteered but been rejected for service, a badge was duly struck, and by 1916, given to have a membership of 10,000 men.

Nationally the "Rejected Volunteers' Association" (RVA) was established about mid-1916, "for the protection of those who had volunteered but had not been accepted"; given to be about 40,000 men in the State of New South Wales alone. This creation was supported by the Returned Soldiers' Association. The NSW branch of the RVA created an oval badge with "Has volunteered for active service" (although this was later changed to "For Empire"), and the announcement the Commonwealth government was going to issue an official badge within two weeks was met with derision. The RVA badge showed that the men wanted to serve.

A call was made again in World War II in Australia for the creation of a badge and reinaugurate the RVA, to allow rejected volunteers to be acknowledged, and allow their services to be used on the home front.

== Legacy ==
=== Accolades, and voting rights for women ===
Government and media accolades soon followed for those feminist leaders who demonstrated zealous patriotism. Emmeline and Christabel Pankhurst were praised by the establishment press for their efforts to incite men into enlisting. The WSPU's newspaper was rebranded Britannia to reflect its nationalist mission. In 1918, Christabel Pankhurst even stood for Parliament in the so-called "Khaki Election" as a candidate of the ruling coalition, and was endorsed by Prime Minister David Lloyd George's government (a 'coupon' endorsement) in recognition of her wartime loyalty.

Soon after the 1918 Armistice, the Parliament passed the Representation of the People Act, which granted the vote to women over the age of 30, a landmark, though partial, victory for women's suffrage. This outcome was widely interpreted as a reward for women's loyalty and contributions during the war. Politicians who had opposed women's suffrage before the war, such as former Prime Minister H. H. Asquith, changed their position in 1917–1918 in part because they were impressed by women's patriotic service.

=== Scholarly legacy ===
Despite numerous mentions and recollections of the White Feather Movement, Scholars suggest it has received only passing attention from historians of the war. Feminist scholars in UK and the US, influenced in the early eighties by the women's peace encampment at Greenham Common, instead focused almost exclusively on the much celebrated history of feminist pacifism.

In response to the work of Arthur Marwick, David Mitchell, and other historians who highlighted vivid accounts of women's enthusiasm for the war, the Greenham Common school argued that the white feather campaign was largely misogynistic propaganda designed to discredit women while obscuring the more substantial contributions of feminist pacifists. According to historian Nicoletta Gullace, although more recent scholarship in women's history has broadened its focus beyond pacifism, feminist historians have still paid relatively little attention to campaign itself, or the active role that women played in the recruitment campaigns.

In May 1964, Gordon Watkins, producer of a BBC series commemorating the fiftieth anniversary of the First World War, published an advertisement seeking accounts from women who had presented white feathers during the war, as well as from the men who had received them. Gordon suggested "I doubt if any of these women will be brazen enough to admit it now," and described its aim as examining the "lunatic fringe" that had existed on the British home front during part of the conflict. The BBC received numerous responses from men who reported having been given white feathers, but only two letters from women who acknowledged distributing them.

=== Social opinions ===
Following the 1950s, the first World War increasingly came to be viewed as a tragic and futile conflict. This shift in public memory influenced how surviving relatives interpreted the White Feather movement, with many directly attributing the deaths of loved ones to the movement.

== In popular culture ==
=== Literature ===
- In As One Non-combatant to Another, writer George Orwell, under the pseudonym 'Obadiah Hornbooke,' writes about the difficulty it was to ignore a white feather during WW1.
- Rilla of Ingleside (1921), sees Anne Shirley's son, Walter Blythe, enlist in the First World War after receiving a white feather in the mail; he dies in battle.
- The Man Who Stayed at Home, a 1914 play by J. E. Harold Terry and Lechmere Worrall, was renamed The White Feather when staged in North America. The title character is a British secret agent who is falsely perceived to be a coward for his refusal to enlist.
- In The Camels are Coming (1932), Biggles is handed a white feather by a woman while on leave in civilian clothes, who is later taken aback to find he is a Royal Flying Corps' leading pilot.
- In the 1991 novel Regeneration, the character Burns is given white feathers during his leave from Craiglockhart War Hospital.
- In the 1997 book Jingo, citizens of Ankh-Morpork are handed white feathers for not enlisting to fight in the war against Klatch.
- In the novel Birds of a Feather (2004), girls take it upon themselves to hand out feathers to young men not in uniform to shame them into enlisting in The Great War.
- In the 2015 graphic novel Suffrajitsu: Mrs. Pankhurst's Amazons, Christabel Pankhurst is depicted encouraging women to hand white feathers to young men they see out of uniform. Persephone Wright heretofore a staunch supporter of Pankhurst's Votes for Women campaigns, rejects the idea, saying "a man who's been shamed into service isn't a volunteer at all".

=== Music ===
- The Order of the White Feather was the inspiration for the Weddings Parties Anything song "Scorn of the Women", which concerns a man who is deemed medically unfit for service when he attempts to enlist, and is unjustly accused of cowardice.
- In 1983, new wave band Kajagoogoo released their debut album called White Feathers, whose opener was the title track, a light-hearted allegory for weak people.

=== Film and television ===
- In the TV series To Serve Them All My Days, David Powlett-Jones, a shell-shocked officer, takes a position in a school. Suspecting a fellow teacher may be avoiding war duty, he muses, "I'd give a good deal to know whether he's really got a gammy knee", to which an acerbic colleague responds, "I suppose we couldn't get some chubby cherub to give him the white feather".
- The 2000 Canadian miniseries, Anne of Green Gables: The Continuing Story, includes a scene in which Anne Shirley's fiancé, Gilbert Blythe, receives a white feather, despite the fact he is a medical doctor and so provides an essential service at home. He eventually does enlist, and much of the plot deals with Anne searching for him when he's declared missing in action.
- In the 2007 British period drama Lilies, the brother of the protagonists is discharged from the military during World War I after his boat sinks and he is one of a handful of shell-shocked survivors. Billy is given numerous white feathers for his perceived cowardice, and begins to hallucinate them choking him. This is a recurring theme throughout the series.
- In the 2010 Australian film Beneath Hill 60 about real-life soldier Oliver Woodward, Woodward, before enlisting, receives several feathers to which he jokingly states, "Just a few more feathers, and I'll have a whole chicken."
- In Downton Abbey, a pair of young women interrupt a benefit concert to hand out white feathers to the men who have not enlisted, before being ordered out by an angry Earl of Grantham.
- In the 2021 film The King's Man, Conrad is given a white feather to shame him into enlisting in the British Army.

== See also ==
- Conscription
- Discrimination against men
- Feminism
- History of the United Kingdom during the First World War
- Male expendability
- Militarism
- Misandry
- National Union of Women's Suffrage Societies
- Pacifism
- Reverse sexism
- Suffragette
- The Four Feathers
- White feather
- Women and children first
- Women of Britain Say 'Go!'
- Women's Social and Political Union
- World War I
