= The Mysteries of Myra =

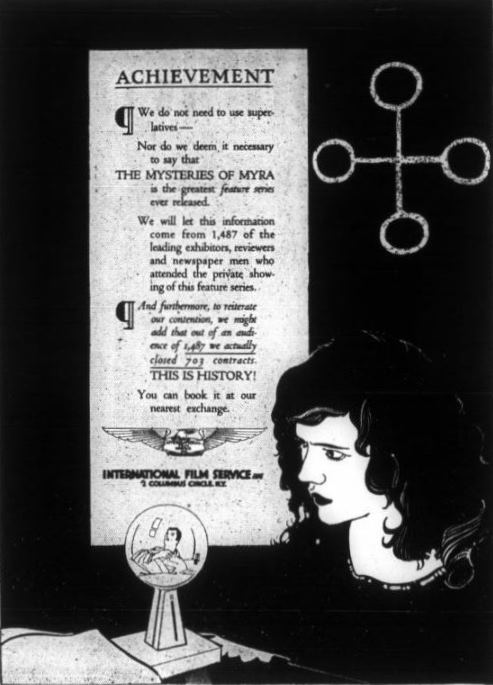
- Advertisement
- Directed by: Leopold Wharton; Theodore Wharton
- Written by: Charles W. Goddard
- Based on: ideas by Hereward Carrington
- Produced by: International Film Service Wharton
- Starring: Jean Sothern; Howard Estabrook
- Production company: International Film Service
- Distributed by: Pathé Exchange
- Release date: April 24, 1916
- Running time: 15 episodes, 31 reels
- Country: United States
- Language: Silent (English intertitles)

The Mysteries of Myra is a 1916 American silent film serial with episodes directed by Leopold and Theodore Wharton and starring Jean Sothern and Howard Estabrook. It was produced in Ithaca, New York by the Wharton Studio and distributed by Pathé Exchange.

Pioneering paranormal investigator Hereward Carrington was the primary consultant on the production which was the first "paranormal investigation" series ever produced and introduced supernatural content such as automatic writing and astral body transfers to the movies.

Howard Estabrook's character was based on Carrington, who treated supernatural subjects as being worthy of scientific investigation, and the Master of the Black Order and his cult inspired by Aliester Crowley.

Much of the series is lost but reels or footage from four episodes exist.

Existing footage of the serial and the newspaper novel version have been restored and reconstructed by Eric Stedman of the Serial Squadron.

Further reference: The Mysteries of Myra Website

== Cast ==
- Jean Sothern as Myra Maynard
- Howard Estabrook as Dr. Payson Alden
- Allan Murnane as Arthur Varney
- M. W. Rale as Master of the Black Order
- Shino Mori as Professor Haji
- Bessie Wharton as Mrs. Maynard
- Elsie Baker as The Vampire Woman
- Leroy Baker as Willis, The Maynards' Butler

== Chapter titles ==
1. The Dagger of Dreams
2. The Poisoned Flower
3. The Mystic Mirrors
4. The Wheel of Spirit
5. The Fumes of Fear* (fragment)
6. The Hypnotic Clue
7. The Mystery Mind
8. The Nether World
9. Invisible Destroyer
10. Levitation
11. The Fire-Elemental* (2 Reels)
12. Elixir of Youth* (1 Reel)
13. Witchcraft
14. Suspended Animation
15. The Thought Monster* (1 Reel)
