= The Four Feathers (1929 film) =

American war film by Merian C. Cooper

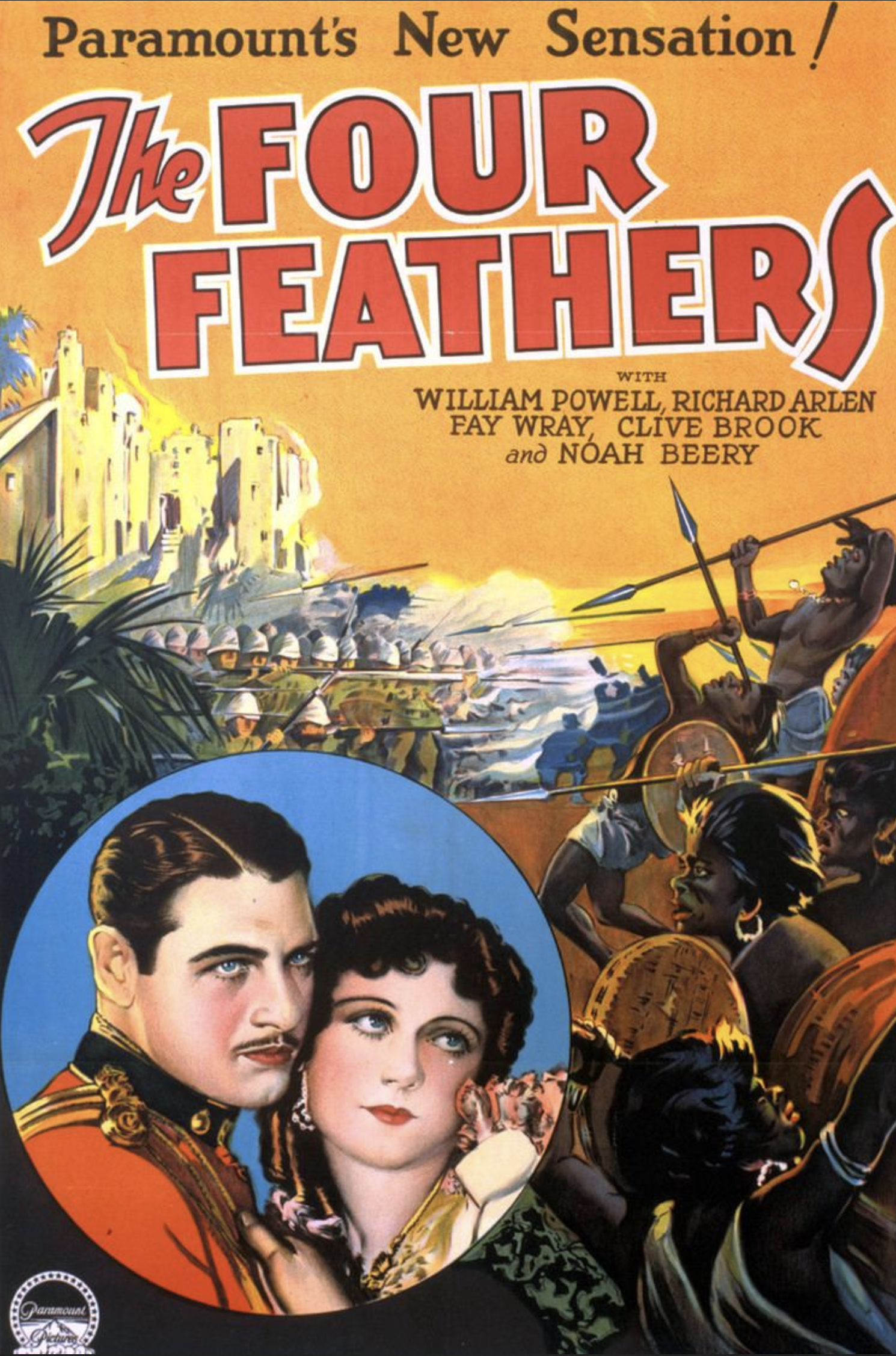
- Film poster
- Directed by: Merian C. Cooper; Lothar Mendes; Ernest B. Schoedsack
- Written by: Hope Loring; Howard Estabrook; John Farrow; Julian Johnson
- Based on: The Four Feathers; 1902 novel by A. E. W. Mason
- Produced by: David O. Selznick
- Starring: Fay Wray; William Powell; Noah Beery Sr. Clive Brook; Richard Arlen
- Cinematography: Robert Kurrle; Merian C. Cooper; Ernest B. Schoedsack
- Edited by: Ernest B. Schoedsack
- Music by: William Frederick Peters
- Distributed by: Paramount Pictures
- Release date: June 1929
- Running time: 80 minutes
- Country: United States
- Languages: Sound (synchronized); English intertitles

The Four Feathers is a 1929 American synchronized sound war film directed by Merian C. Cooper and starring William Powell, Richard Arlen, Clive Brook and Fay Wray. This was the third of numerous film versions of the 1902 novel The Four Feathers written by A. E. W. Mason. While the film has no audible dialog, it was released with a synchronized musical score with sound effects using both the sound-on-disc and sound-on-film process. The 1929 version of The Four Feathers premiered at the Criterion Theatre in New York City in June 1929.

Window poster with screening times, probably 1930

== Plot ==
The film.

As children, Harry promises to marry Ethne, both the offspring of English Army officers, but she consents only if he will dress as a soldier. When Harry is still a child, his father tells him stories about the Crimean War, including one where a runaway soldier is spurred into suicide by Harry's father, who sent him a white feather to show his disapproval of cowardice.

As a young man, Harry joins the Royal West Kent Regiment and is engaged to Ethne. His best friends are Durrance, Trench, and Castleton. Harry receives a telegram that their regiment is being deployed to the Soudan Expedition, and he resigns from the army. His friends and Ethne find out why Harry resigned and give him four white feathers. Harry's father also disapproves, and before he dies, he gives his son a pistol and tells him to shoot himself. Harry decides to act courageously in front of his friends in order to get them to take back their feathers, and travels to Sudan.

In the Sudan, Trench has been captured by the enemy. Harry saves him, and Trench takes back the white feather. Harry stops a mutiny and saves Castelton from an ambush. Ethne and Harry get back together.

== Cast ==
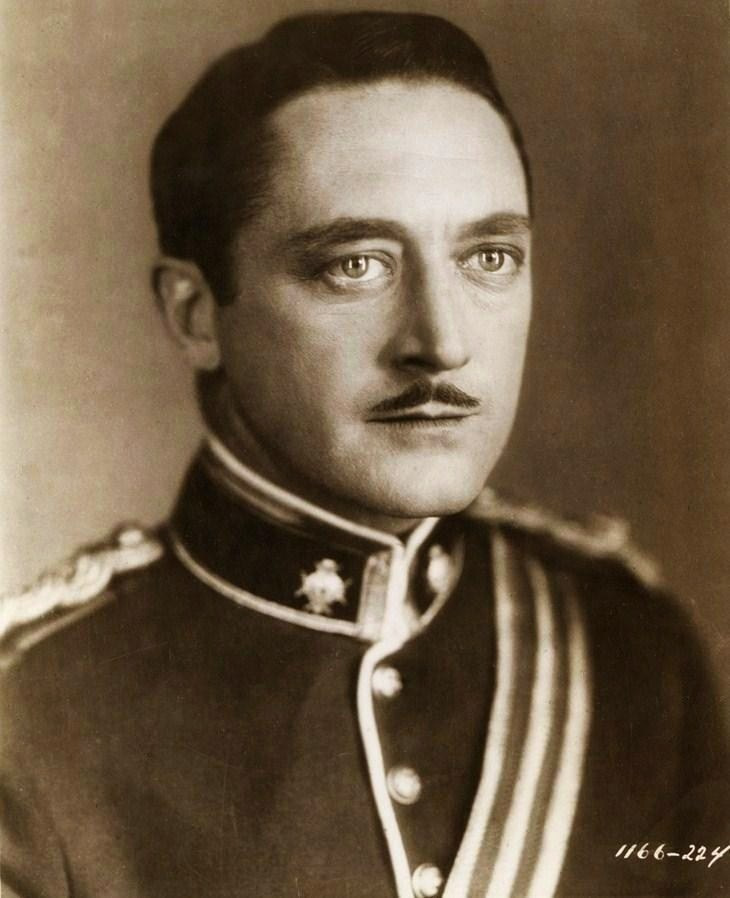
Theodore von Elzt in The Four Feathers

- Richard Arlen as Lt. Harry Feversham
  - Philippe De Lacy as Harry, age 10
- Fay Wray as Ethne Eustace
- Clive Brook as Lt. Jack Durrance
- William Powell as Capt. William Trench
- Theodore von Eltz as Lt. Castleton
- Noah Beery Sr. as Slave Trader
- E. J. Ratcliffe as Col. Eustace
- George Fawcett as Col. Feversham
- Noble Johnson as Ahmed
- Zack Williams as Idris

== Music ==
The musical score was composed by William Frederick Peters. The Paramount orchestra heard on the soundtrack was directed by Louis de Francesco while Max Terr supervised the recording.

== Production ==
The picture has the distinction of being one of the last major Hollywood pictures to be released without audible dialogue. The soundtrack was recorded by Paramount Pictures using the Western Electric Sound System recording process. The synchronized film featured a musical score with sound effects. The studio considered making it a full talkie, and acquired the dialogue rights to the story for an additional $2,500 on top of the silent rights for which they had paid $12,500.

The book the film was based on, The Four Feathers (1902), was one of the only books in Cooper's possession while he served as a volunteer for the Polish resistance in Kościuszko's Squadron. Cooper found the book inspirational. Kamran Rastegar, associate professor of Arabic and comparative literature at Tufts University, noted several parallels between Cooper's life and that of the protagonist of Four Feathers: both were born into military families, expelled from naval colleges, voluntarily enlisted, and escaped from military prisons. Cooper embraced the ideology both of the masculine ideal and the colonial idea that white men had a right to rule over others.

Cooper, Shoedsack, and Shoedsack's wife, Ruth Rose, traveled to Tanzania and Sudan to shoot parts of the film in 1927. Cooper wrote "Two Fighting Tribes of Sudan" for a 1929 National Geographic article using material from the expedition. Film from the expedition was interweaved with parts shot on sets in Hollywood. Actors were not transported to Sudan, which helped reduce filming costs. Four Feathers was one of the first films to use this technique. Cooper oversaw trapping hippopotamuses for a scene where they stampede into a river, and three people died in the process. After a few native villagers went home during the trapping of hippos, Cooper beat "every native he could find." Cooper observed the baboons for three months before capturing them, and his notes filled 800 pages. Cooper also put baboons on a suspension bridge over a river and cut it down in order to film them trying to swim to safety. Back in California, the producers built a large camp between Palm Springs and Indio to shoot the actors themselves in fight scenes. Cooper and Shoedsack hired African-Americans from Los Angeles to stand in for Hadendoan Sudanese men.

Adolph Zukor, Paramount studio head, insisted on the film having no talking sequences, even though the directors wanted it to be a talkie. The film has been billed as the "last of the big silent films" even though it had a soundtrack and sound effects. According to Thomas Schatz, producer Selznick saved the film from disaster by conducting retakes and reediting the film after its initial preview. Cooper requested that Selznick stay off of the set, and Selznick complied. However, Cooper was supposed to approve of Selznik's edits, but was away during postproduction of The Four Feathers. He disliked the new takes.

== Criticism ==
Peter Limbrick, assistant professor in film and digital media at the University of California, Santa Cruz, noted that The Four Feathers is a masculine adventure that values power above other virtues and excludes women. Limbrick also noted that the way the film used African-American extras in California to stand in for Hadendoans in Sudan reflected the way white settlers like Cooper viewed their position in society in the United States as mirroring that of the British colonialists invading Sudan.

Cooper's comments to others while abroad showed that he viewed all black people as racially inferior, a settler superiority that leads to the narrative found in The Four Feathers, which is "responding less to the facts of the land than to preexisting colonial visions of it, and disavowing indigenous habitation and meaning." Jeffrey Richards referenced how the characters of the young soldiers fulfilled the "Imperial hero" archetype: tall, thin, and mustached.

Kamran Rastegar notes that Cooper's Feversham shows resentment and anger when reincorporated into the military and reunited with Ethne. Rather than transforming from a coward to a hero, Feversham seems to be a hero who "has only now found recognition for what he always had been." According to Rastegar, Cooper's Feversham improved on colonial forms of masculinity by having him display "a brooding sense of ressentiment." Fear of "a corruption of masculinity" is a constant theme in this and other versions of The Four Feathers, the fantasy of redemption through service to an empire leads to "a revalorization of" colonialism.

== See also ==
- List of early sound feature films (1926–1929)
