= Women of Britain Say 'Go!' =

British World War I recruitment poster

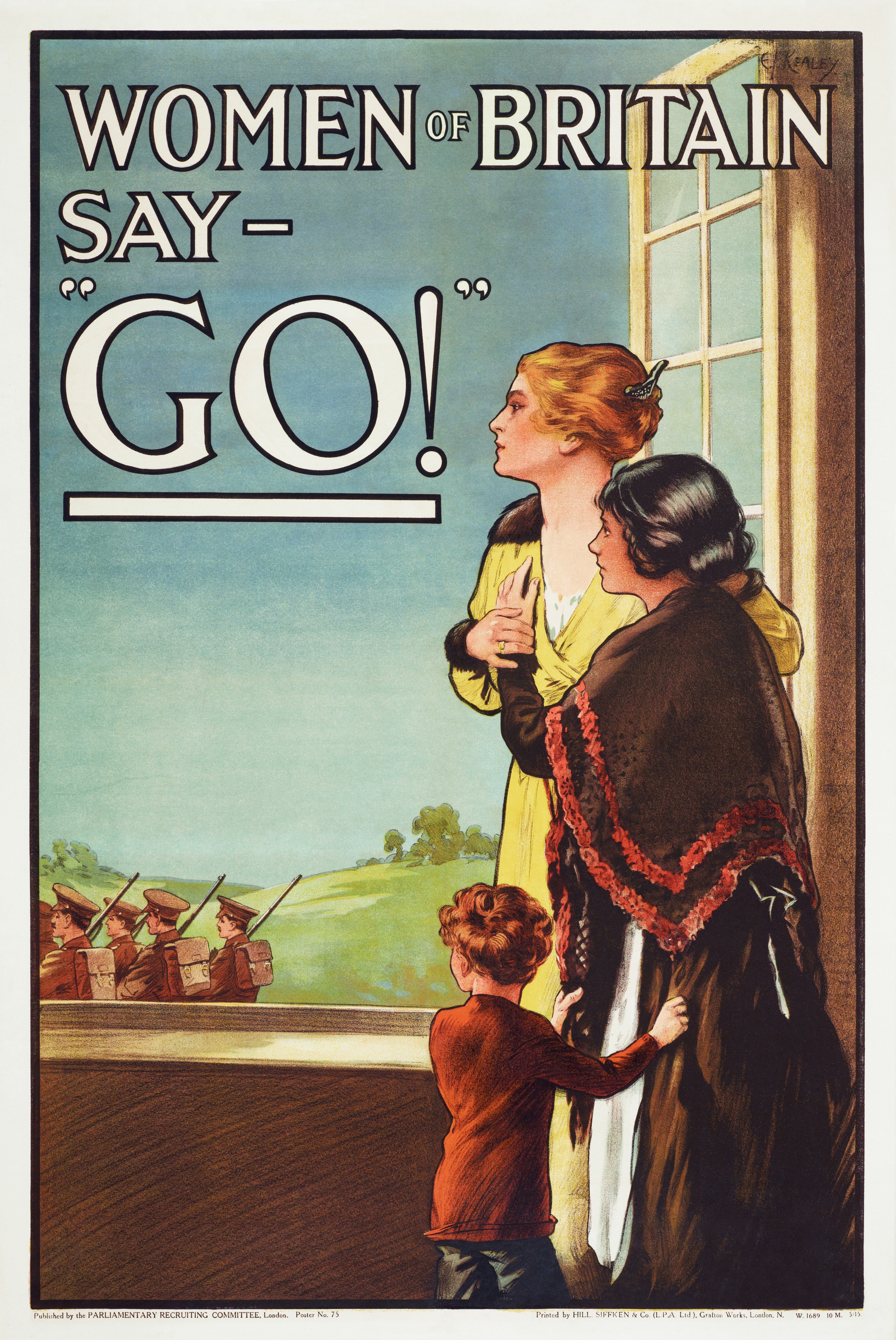
- Poster no.75. W.13741
- Media: Ink, print
- Release date: March 1915
- Production company: Published by the Parliamentary Recruitment Committee
- Produced by: Printed by Hill, Siffken and Co Ltd, London
- Country: United Kingdom

"Women of Britain Say 'Go!'" is a British World War I recruitment propaganda poster created in 1915. It depicts two women and a young boy looking out of an open window at soldiers marching past. Across the top of the poster is the text: "Women of Britain Say 'Go!'". The poster was designed by artist E. J. Kealey and published by the Parliamentary Recruitment Committee, which produced the majority of early World War I recruitment posters. The poster intended to encourage women to tell men they should sign up to the army at a time when British voluntary recruit numbers were declining. The poster utilises gender, guilt and emasculation to emphasise its message. Although "Women of Britain Say 'Go!'" has become an iconic image of World War I, its sentiment was not universally accepted by contemporary British society.

== Background ==
At the outbreak of World War I, Britain did not have a policy of conscription. The government relied on propaganda to persuade men to enlist in the army, and posters were an important medium to achieve this. The approach to propaganda taken by the first recruitment posters was a simple "call to arms" encouraging men to sign up to fight. The method of propaganda started to change around 1915 when the number of volunteer soldiers fell. Propaganda began to draw heavily on themes of gender. Some focused on female imagery by highlighting the innocent vulnerability of mothers, wives and daughters, the strength and resilience of a worker taking part in the war effort embodying the spirit of Britannia, or by depicting women as objects of desire. Historian Karyn Burnham suggests that from a masculine perspective, some posters attempted to guilt men by implying they would be emasculated if they did not fight.

== Publication history ==
"Women of Britain Say 'Go!'" was produced in March 1915. It was printed by Hill, Siffken and Co Ltd, London, and published by the Parliamentary Recruitment Committee, who produced the majority of the early recruitment posters in World War I. It was one of a collection of posters commissioned by the Committee which were targeted towards women. The poster's design was by artist E. J. Kealey. (Note: After World War I, Kealey went on to create posters for the British travel industry.)

== Design ==
=== Description ===
The poster is an ink illustration of two women and a young boy (Note: The relationship between the women and boy have been interpreted in different ways: a mother, son and their maid; a mother and two children; and three generations of a family. The woman on the right has also been described as a Belgian refugee.) looking out of an open window at a countryside landscape with soldiers marching away. The two women hold on to each other with proud expressions as the boy holds on to one of the women. The text at the top and upper left-hand corner of the poster, "Women of Britain Say 'Go!'", is white and outlined in black. Like other early recruitment posters, "Women of Britain Say 'Go!'" is stylised in a Victorian realist illustrative aesthetic which would have been familiar to contemporary audiences. The colour palette of the poster is indicative of commercial advertising posters of the time. Art historian Stephen J. Eskilson describes the imagery of the poster as "striking" with the text only serving to emphasise the underlying intent.

=== Propaganda ===
"Women of Britain Say 'Go!'" relies on gender to present its message. Prior to World War I, the Women's Suffrage Movement had begun to call into question the power balance between men and women. World War I recruitment posters used these anxieties to their advantage, reinforcing the gender stereotypes of women staying at home and men as protectors. "Women of Britain Say 'Go!'" was part of this attempt to ignore pre-war advances by women. It displays two distinct areas to the viewer: indoors and outdoors. This duality of space is reminiscent of the Victorian idea of separate spheres for men and women. The women and young boy in the poster are positioned within a domestic sphere and the male soldiers occupy a public sphere, which matches the perceived roles of men and women in the Victorian ideology. The clear separation of space and gender in the poster highlights that women and children were vulnerable and needed to be protected, and that the men were expected to protect them; it is implied that a husband of one of the women is included in the group of soldiers marching away.

"Women of Britain Say 'Go!'" appealed to women, who played an important part in army recruitment. (Note: The White Feather Campaign was a way in which women played a significant part in forcing men to sign up through guilt; women would hand feathers to men who had not enlisted to fight. Its message encouraged women to force men to enlist in the army.) The directive "Go!" serves not only as a commandment to men, but as an instruction to women to say this to men. However, the poster presents an ideal scenario: it does not call attention to the potential consequences of losing a male family member at war, and the figures depicted on the poster were not representative of the average family's financial situation nor their security. Not all women in Britain shared the sentiment depicted in the poster and many tried to recall family members from the army.

Academic Debra Rae Cohen describes "Women of Britain Say 'Go!'" as a "guilt-inducing slogan". The imagery and text of the poster forced men to come to terms with their loyalty towards their country and family. The countryside landscape in the background, evocative of the green and pleasant land described by the English poet William Blake, emphasised the fact that men were expected to protect this element of the country. Additionally, the instruction to "Go!" is seemingly attributed to all women and implies a unanimous call to action directed at men. The government was aware of the influence that women had in the lives and decisions of men at the time: in 2023, brand communication executive Farhan Urfi summarised the poster's message as "if your mum, your wife, your daughter is saying 'Go to war!', how can you say no?" Along with guilt, the poster also implies emasculation. It uses to its advantage the fact that many potential younger recruits would in all likelihood have been living at home with their mothers: the child in the image, positioned in the domestic sphere, is a boy, suggesting that the men who stayed at home were small and vulnerable—the same as young boys.

== Legacy and impact ==
Cohen describes "Women of Britain Say 'Go!'" as "one of the most iconic images of the Great War" and one of the most frequently cited images within the context of World War I propaganda. The Imperial War Museum describes the poster as an example of one of the more sophisticated and nuanced ways the British government tried to recruit men to the army. There is evidence that the poster also encouraged women to take part in the war effort themselves. The message of the poster was not shared among all contemporary viewers. Among those who criticised the sentiment that women would want men to fight were the poets Richard Aldington, Wilfred Owen and Siegfried Sassoon.

== See also ==
- "Daddy, what did you do in the Great War?"
- Male expendability
- Women in World War I
- White Feather Campaign
