= Ernest English =

British Army Officer, cricketer, and actor

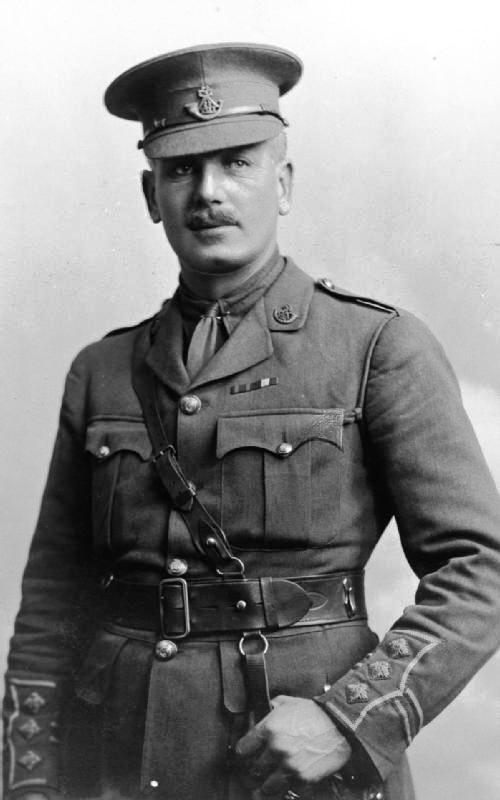
Ernest English with the rank of Captain, c.1909-1915

Lieutenant Colonel Ernest Robert Maling English, DSO (2 December 1874 — 18 August 1941) was a British soldier, cricketer and actor.

English was born in Charlton Kings, Cheltenham. He attended Wellington College and the Royal Military College, Sandhurst, receiving his commission as a second lieutenant in the King's Shropshire Light Infantry on 28 September 1895. Promotion to lieutenant followed on 24 June 1899.

He served in the Second Boer War in South Africa, where he was wounded. After the end of this war, English went with the 2nd battalion of his regiment to British India, leaving from Point Natal to Bombay on the SS Syria in January 1903, and was posted to Ranikhet in Bengal.

He was prompted to captain in 1909, and the following year became Adjutant of the King's Regiment (Liverpool). He served in World War I, and became a major in 1915. He was awarded the Distinguished Service Order (DSO) in 1917, the Croix de Guerre and was twice Mentioned in dispatches. He left the army as a lieutenant colonel on 29 November 1919.

Subsequently, he worked as a stage and film actor. He died in South Kensington on 18 August 1941.

== Cricket career ==
English was a right-handed batsman who played for Gloucestershire. English made a single first-class appearance for the team, during the 1909 season, against Middlesex. He scored a duck in the first innings in which he batted, and two runs in the second.
