= Storm Over the Nile =

1955 film by Zoltan Korda, Terence Young

- Original cinema poster
- Directed by: Zoltan Korda; Terence Young
- Written by: R. C. Sherriff; Lajos Bíró
- Based on: The Four Feathers; 1902 novel by A. E. W. Mason
- Produced by: Zoltan Korda
- Starring: Laurence Harvey; Anthony Steel; James Robertson Justice; Mary Ure; Geoffrey Keen; Ronald Lewis; Ian Carmichael
- Cinematography: Osmond Borradaile; Edward Scaife
- Edited by: Raymond Poulton
- Music by: Benjamin Frankel
- Production company: London Films
- Distributed by: Independent Film Distributors
- Release date: 26 December 1955
- Running time: 107 minutes
- Country: United Kingdom
- Language: English
- Box office: £197,803 (UK)

Storm Over the Nile is a 1955 British adventure film adaptation of the 1902 novel The Four Feathers, directed by Terence Young and Zoltan Korda. The film not only extensively used footage of the action scenes from the 1939 film version stretched into CinemaScope, but is a shot-for-shot, almost line-for-line remake of the earlier film, which was also directed by Korda. Several pieces of music by the original composer Miklos Rozsa were also utilized. It featured Anthony Steel, Laurence Harvey, James Robertson Justice, Mary Ure, Ian Carmichael, Michael Hordern and Christopher Lee. The film was shot on location in the Sudan.

== Plot ==
Harry Faversham is a sensitive child interested in intellectual pursuits, much to the dismay of his father, a Crimean War veteran. Descended from a proud lineage of soldiers, his father views Harry as weak and cowardly. Harry grows up haunted by his father's war stories, particularly those about cowardly soldiers who took their own lives out of shame. As an adult, Harry fulfills his father's expectations by accepting a commission in the Royal North Surrey Regiment and becomes engaged to Mary, the daughter of his father's friend, General Burroughs—despite the disapproval of his romantic rival and fellow officer, John Durrance.

Following his father's death, Harry's regiment is ordered to the Sudan Campaign to join General Herbert Kitchener's forces and avenge General Gordon's death at the Siege of Khartoum. Unwilling to fight, Harry resigns his commission. In response, he receives three white feathers—symbols of cowardice—from his fellow officers, John, Thomas Willoughby, and Mary's brother, Peter. Mary expresses her disappointment in Harry, believing they are bound by their families' expectations. Harry ends their relationship after insisting that she also give him a feather, which she reluctantly does.

Months later, Harry encounters his father's old friend, Dr. Sutton. Confiding in him, Harry laments being branded a coward. Sutton disagrees, arguing that Harry is brave—ambitious, principled, and unwilling to fight in a war he does not believe in. Determined to return the feathers and redeem himself, Harry travels to Egypt. There, Sutton's friend disguises Harry as a member of the Sengali tribe—a despised group whose tongues were cut out—to conceal his inability to speak Arabic. Harry receives a brand on his forehead and darkens his skin before setting off to find his old regiment near the Cataracts of the Nile.

Meanwhile, during a reconnaissance mission, John hides in a sun-exposed crevice to evade Sudanese forces, but hours of exposure cause heatstroke and leave him permanently blind. That night, Harry anonymously warns the company of an impending attack and saves John's life. Despite this, most of the company is killed or captured, including Peter and Thomas, who are imprisoned in Omdurman. Still concealing his identity, Harry guides a weakened John back to British lines.

Back in England, Sutton tells Mary that Harry had gone to Egypt and is now presumed dead. Later, John returns home and becomes engaged to Mary, though she remains heartbroken over Harry. During dinner, John discusses his mysterious saviour and shares a letter Mary sent him that he had carried throughout the campaign, unaware that a feather, secretly placed by Harry, falls out. Mary sees the feather and realises Harry is alive.

In Egypt, the disguised Harry infiltrates Omdurman and covertly delivers a file to the imprisoned Peter and Thomas. The guards become suspicious of his behaviour and search him, discovering the remaining feathers. They imprison him with the others, and he reveals his identity. Kitchener attacks Omdurman, distracting its forces and allowing Harry to lead a daring escape, rallying the British and Sudanese prisoners to help capture Omdurman. As they raise the Union Jack over the city, the battle is won in Kitchener's favour.

Back in England, John hears news of the victory, learning that Peter and Thomas were saved by Harry. Realising who his saviour had been, he checks the letter again and finds the feather. Acknowledging that Mary still loves Harry, John writes her a letter in which he lies, claiming he is travelling abroad to seek treatment for his blindness, thus releasing her from any obligation to him. Sometime later, Harry returns home and reunites with Mary, finally returning her feather.

== Cast ==
- Anthony Steel as Harry Faversham
  - Paul Streather as Young Harry Faversham
- Laurence Harvey as John Durrance
- James Robertson Justice as General Burroughs
- Mary Ure as Mary Burroughs
- Ronald Lewis as Peter Burroughs
- Ian Carmichael as Willoughby
- Jack Lambert as Colonel
- Raymond Francis as Colonel's Aide
- Geoffrey Keen as Dr. Sutton
- Michael Hordern as General Faversham
- Ferdy Mayne as Dr. Harraz
- Christopher Lee as Karaga Pasha
- John Wynn as Sergeant
- Avis Scott as Sergeant's Wife
- Roger Delgado as Native Spy
- Frank Singuineau as Native Servant
- Ben Williams as Faversham's Butler
- Vincent Holman as Burroughs' Butler
- N. Al Basri as Dervish
- M. H. Gadalla as Dervish
- Michael Argy as Dervish
- Edwin Cary as Dervish
- John Laurie as Khalifa (uncredited) (in a sequence taken from Korda's 1939 The Four Feathers, along with some of the battle scenes)
- Sam Kydd as Joe (uncredited)

== Production ==
The film was one of the last movies made by Alexander Korda. The producer said he wanted to make films that were in colour and had big screen spectacle in order to entice audiences away from television. Finance came in part from Romulus Films.

Kenneth More says Korda offered him a lead role in the film but he turned it down to appear in The Deep Blue Sea (1955) instead. At one point it was going to be called None But the Brave. Ann Miller was reportedly offered a role. It was an early film role for Ronald Lewis who was signed to a contract by Korda after impressing on stage in Mourning Becomes Electra.

The film used locally posted British soldiers for some of the battle scenes. Zoltan Korda reportedly complained the process of blowing up the old footage to CinemaScope "stretched the camels out until they looked like greyhounds."

== Reception ==
Variety said it "places full emphasis on action".

FilmInk said Anthony Steel "isn't terribly convincing as a coward, but he has heroic dash suitable for the part – he completely suits the universe of the movie (as opposed to co-star Laurence Harvey who always seems to be 'acting')."
