= Four Feathers =

1915 film by J. Searle Dawley

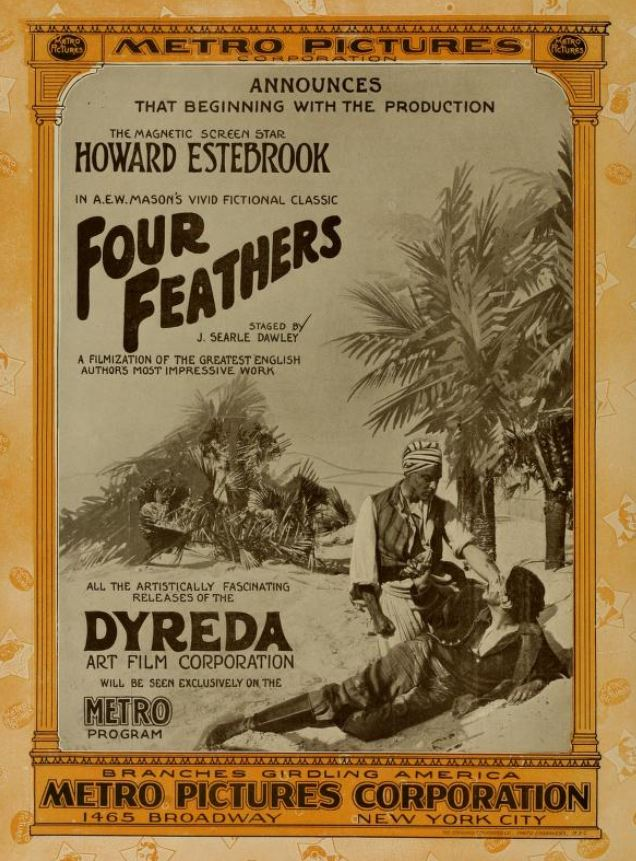
- Directed by: J. Searle Dawley
- Based on: The Four Feathers; 1902 novel by A. E. W. Mason
- Distributed by: Metro Pictures
- Release date: May 24, 1915
- Running time: 5 reels
- Country: United States
- Language: English

Four Feathers (1915) is a silent film adaptation of A. E. W. Mason's 1902 novel The Four Feathers.

== Plot ==
Harry Faversham (played by John Clements) is a British army officer who refuses to avenge the death of a legendary general who was murdered some ten years ago. He is awarded three feathers by his officers. When his fiancée fails to defend his stance, he plucks a feather from her fan.

He proves his courage by rescuing his comrades in potentially dangerous and life-threatening situations at enemy lines in North Africa. Harry later returns each of the feathers as proof of his redemption and courage.

== Cast ==
- Edgar L. Davenport as General Faversham
- Fuller Mellish as Lieutenant Sutch
- Ogden Childe as Harry Faversham, age 14
- Howard Estabrook as Captain Harry Faversham
- Arthur Evers as Captain Jack Durrance
- George Moss (actor) as Mr. Eustace
- Irene Warfield as Ethne Eustace
