= The Four Feathers =

1902 novel by A. E. W. Mason

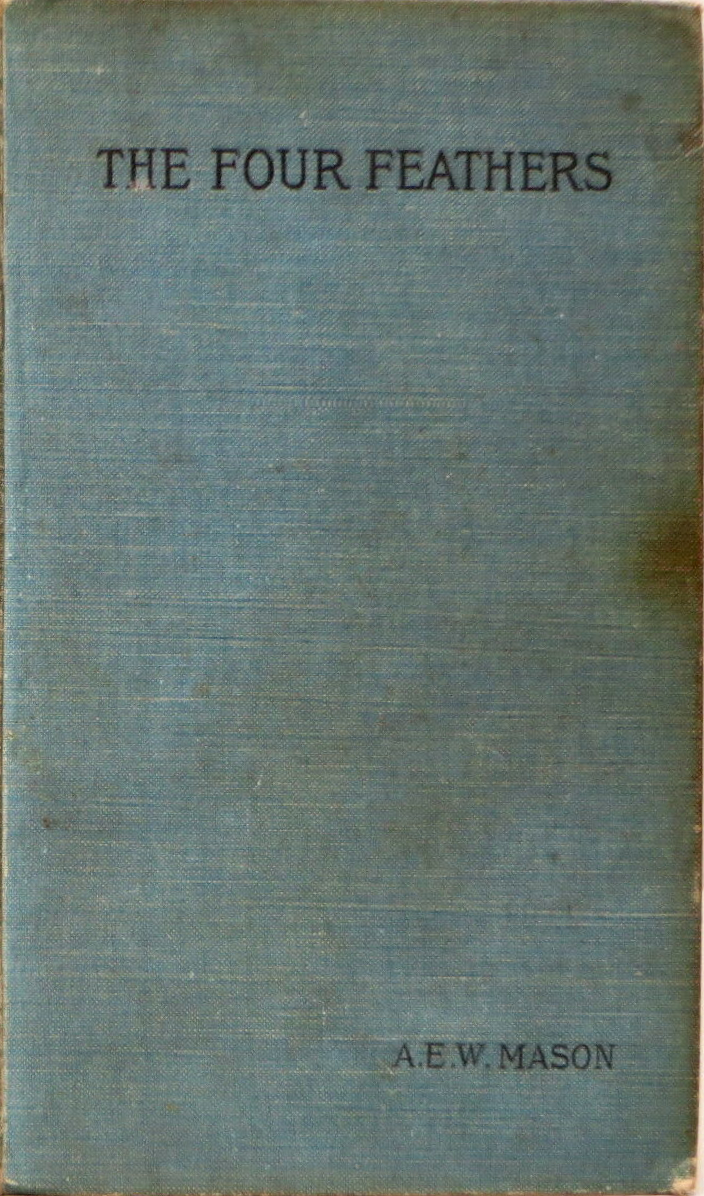
- Front cover of the first edition (UK)
- Author: A. E. W. Mason
- Language: English
- Publisher: Macmillan
- Publication date: 1902
- OCLC: 848975

The Four Feathers is a 1902 adventure novel by British writer A. E. W. Mason that has inspired many films of the same title. In December 1901, Cornhill Magazine announced the title as one of two new serial stories to be published in the forthcoming year. Against the background of the Mahdist War, young Feversham disgraces himself by quitting his regiment; others condemn his cowardice, symbolized by the four white feathers they give him. He belatedly redeems himself with acts of courage and wins back the heart of the woman he loves.

== Plot summary ==
British officer Harry Feversham resigns from his commission in the Royal North Surrey Regiment just before Lord Wolseley's 1882 expedition to Egypt to suppress the rising of Colonel Ahmed Orabi. He is censured for cowardice by three of his comrades—Captain Trench and Lieutenants Castleton and Willoughby—signified by their delivery of three white feathers to him. His Ulster fiancée, Ethne Eustace, breaks off their engagement and also gives him a white feather. His best friend in the regiment, Captain Durrance, becomes a rival for Ethne.

Harry talks with Lieutenant Sutch, a friend of his late father who is an imposing retired general. He questions his own motives and freely acknowledges his cowardice, but says he will redeem himself by acts that will convince his critics to take back the feathers. He travels on his own to Egypt and Sudan, where in 1882 Muhammad Ahmed proclaimed himself the Mahdi (Guided One) and raised a holy war. On 26 January 1885, his Dervish forces captured Khartoum and killed its British governor, General Charles George Gordon. Most of the action over the next six years takes place in the eastern Sudan, where the British and Egyptians held Suakin. Durrance is blinded by sunstroke and invalided. Castleton is killed at Tamai, where a British square is briefly broken by a Mahdi attack.

Harry's first success comes when he recovers lost letters of Gordon. He is aided by a Sudanese Arab, Abou Fatma. Later, disguised as a mad Greek musician, Harry is imprisoned in Omdurman, where he rescues Captain Trench who had been captured on a reconnaissance mission. They escape.

Learning of his actions, Willoughby and Trench give Ethne the feathers they had taken back from Harry. He returns to England and then travels on to Ramelton, a small town in the north of County Donegal in Ulster in the north of Ireland, where he sees Ethne for what he thinks is one last time, as she has decided to devote herself to the blind Durrance. But Durrance believes that Ethne loves Harry and selflessly frees her for Harry. Ethne and Harry wed, and Durrance travels to "the East" as a civilian.

== Film, TV and theatrical adaptations ==
This novel's story was adapted in several films with all films retaining much of the storyline.

In the 1929 silent version, a square of Highlanders is broken, but saved by Feversham and the Egyptian garrison of a besieged fort. Set in the 1880s, its great moment comes as wild hippos in a river attack the Dervishes pursuing Feversham.

The films each feature a British square broken in a dramatic battle sequence. This is mentioned in the novel in a battle in which the square recovered. The various film versions differ in historical context.

The 2002 version starring Heath Ledger is set during the 1884–85 campaign. The British infantry square was broken in the battle of Abu Klea, and the British are forced to retreat. Critics complained the film did not explore the characters, and had historical inaccuracies in uniform dress. The central battle is accurately portrayed in the film Khartoum (1966). The Muslims called Dervishes or The Mahdi are the same, as are the geographic settings of Britain, Egypt and the Sudan.

The various film versions are as follows:

Year	Title	Country	Director	Notes
1915	Four Feathers	USA	J. Searle Dawley	Black-and-white, silent.
1921	The Four Feathers	UK	René Plaissetty	Roger Livesey appeared in a minor role. Black-and-white, silent.
1929	The Four Feathers	US	Merian C. Cooper; Lothar Mendes; Ernest B. Schoedsack	Richard Arlen, Fay Wray, Clive Brook. Black-and-white, silent.
1939	The Four Feathers	UK	Zoltan Korda	Starring Ralph Richardson, John Clements, C. Aubrey Smith, June Duprez. Considered the best of the film versions, this was lavishly filmed in colour in many historical African locations.
1955	Storm Over the Nile	UK	Terence Young, Zoltan Korda	Starring Anthony Steel, James Robertson Justice, Ian Carmichael, Ronald Lewis, Michael Hordern. A low-budget remake in CinemaScope, using much of the location footage shot for the 1939 film and the same script – one of the few instances in which this was done (see Shot-for-shot for other examples).
1978	The Four Feathers	UK	Don Sharp	Starring Robert Powell, Simon Ward, Beau Bridges and Jane Seymour. Completely remade for a new generation (although several scenes were inserted from the 1939 version, e.g. the troops boarding the train in London, a panorama featuring dhows on the Nile, the British Army on parade).
2002	The Four Feathers	US	Shekhar Kapur	Starring Heath Ledger, Wes Bentley, and Kate Hudson. Made by an Indian director, this version takes a revisionist stance on the novel's themes of masculinity, empire, and the clash of modern Western civilization with an ancient Islamic culture. Unlike earlier versions, this bases its big battle scene on the 1885 Battle of Abu Klea (thirteen years before Omdurman). The script calls for the actors portraying British soldiers to wear anachronistic scarlet tunics. The film also depicts a British loss at Abu Klea instead of a victory.
