= White feather (symbol) =

Symbol used for cowardice or bravery

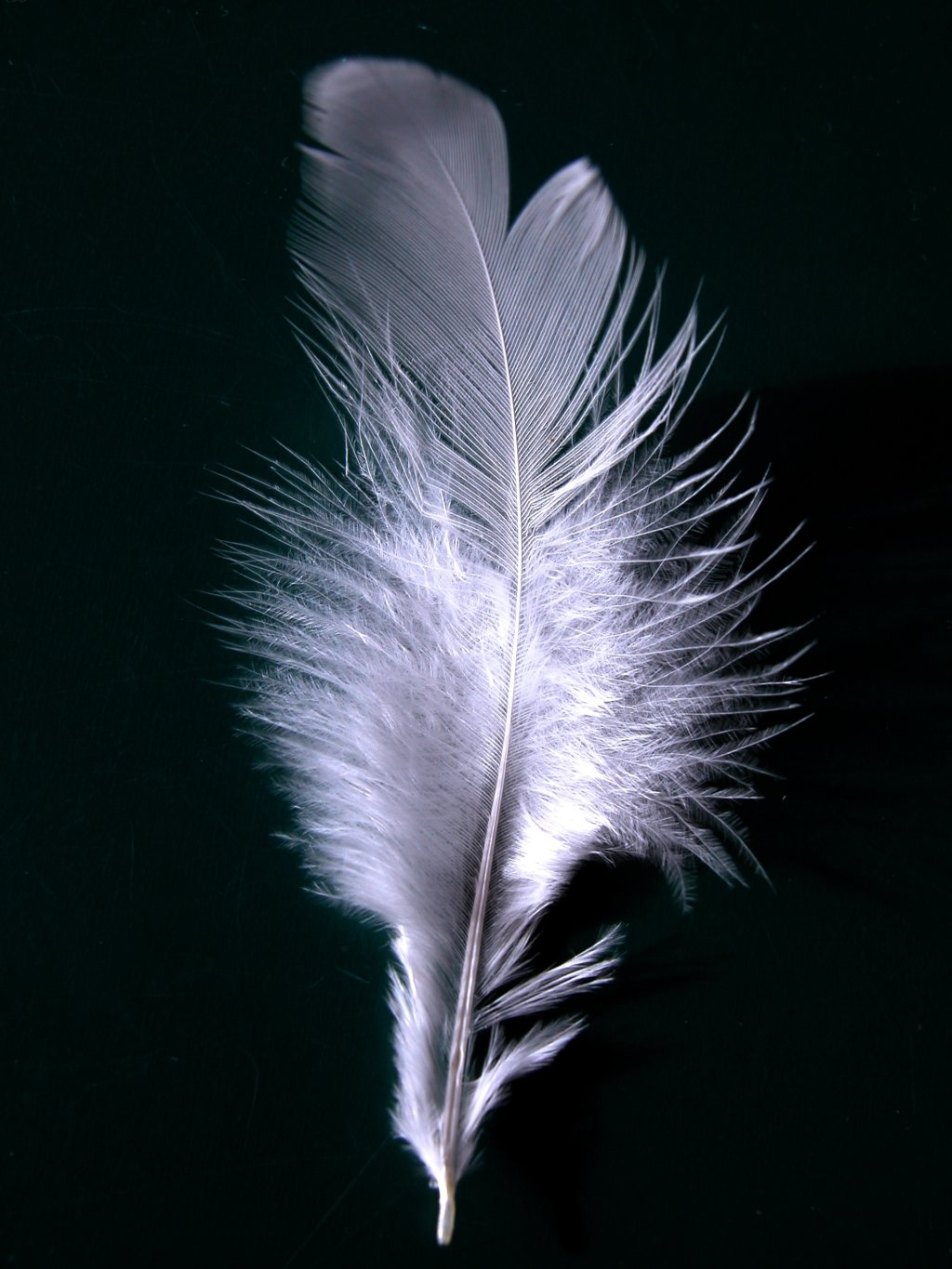
A white feather against a black background

The white feather was a widely recognised propaganda symbol in the United Kingdom, Australia and other Commonwealth countries. It was most prominently used in the "White Feather Movement" in Britain during the First World War, in which women gave white feathers to non-enlisting men, symbolizing cowardice and shaming them into signing up for military service.

Other than the White Feather Movement, it has, among other meanings, represented cowardice or conscientious pacifism; as in A. E. W. Mason's 1902 book The Four Feathers. In the 21st century, the meaning of a white feather as a symbol of cowardice is almost entirely limited to historical reference. In the United States armed forces, however, it has been used to signify extraordinary bravery and excellence in combat marksmanship.

== History ==
=== As a symbol of cowardice ===
The use of the phrase "white feather" to symbolise cowardice is attested from the late 18th century, according to the Oxford English Dictionary. The OED cites A Classical Dictionary of the Vulgar Tongue (1785), in which lexicographer Francis Grose wrote: "White feather, he has a white feather, he is a coward, an allusion to a game cock, where having a white feather, is a proof he is not of the true game breed". This was in the context of cockfighting, a common entertainment in Georgian England.

=== The Crusades ===
Shame was exerted upon men in England and France who had not taken the cross at the time of the Third Crusade. "A great many men sent each other wool and distaff, hinting that if anyone failed to join this military undertaking they were only fit for women's work". Wool played an important role in the medieval economy, and a distaff is a tool for spinning the raw material into yarn; the activities of textile production were so firmly associated with girls and women that "distaff" became a metonym for women's work.

=== World War I ===
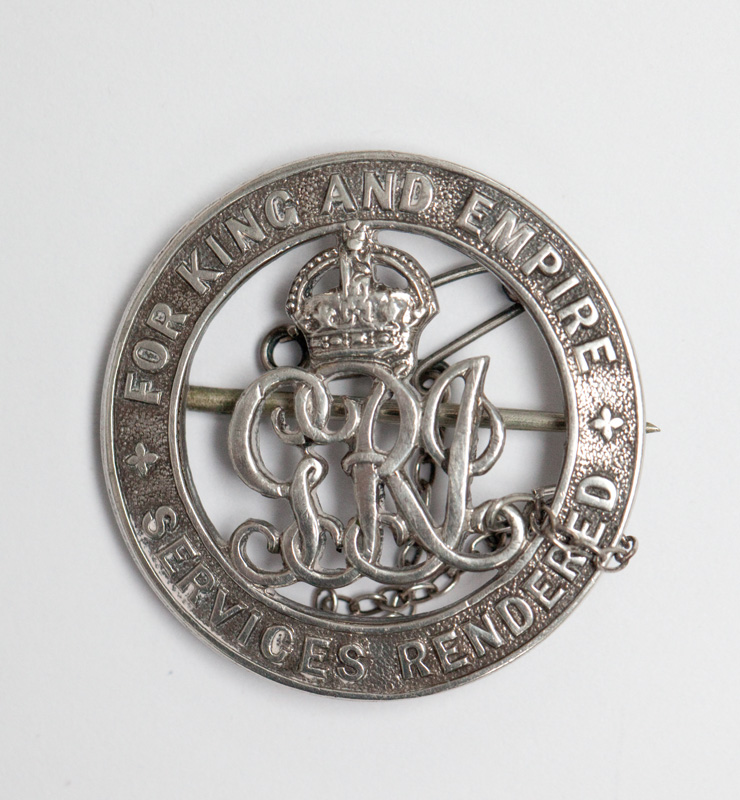
Around the rim of a Silver War Badge is "For King and Empire; Services Rendered"

In Britain, Admiral Charles Penrose-Fitzgerald founded in August 1914 what became known as the "Order of the White Feather", where groups of young women handed out white feathers to men in civilian attire in public places. This was intended to shame them into enlisting in military service.

The leaders of the British suffragette movement called Women's Social and Political Union (WSPU), Emmeline Pankhurst and her daughter Christabel both became prominent figures in the white feather movement. Their big outreach and influence towards women became important driving factors behind the movement.

The practice of presenting a white ribbon, personally or by mail, also occurred in other areas of the British Empire such as Australia and New Zealand.

=== World War II ===
The white feather campaign was renewed during World War II.

=== As a symbol of pacifism and peace ===
In contrast, the white feather has been used by some pacifist organisations as an icon of abstinence from violence.

In the 1870s, the Māori prophet of passive resistance Te Whiti o Rongomai promoted the wearing of white feathers by his followers at Parihaka. They are still worn by the iwi associated with that area, and by Te Āti Awa in Wellington. They are known as te raukura, which literally means the red feather, but metaphorically, the chiefly feather. They are usually three in number, interpreted as standing for "glory to God, peace on earth, goodwill toward people" (Luke 2:14). Albatross feathers are preferred, but any white feathers will suffice. They are usually worn in the hair or on the lapel (but not from the ear).

Some time after the war, pacifists found an alternative interpretation of the white feather as a symbol of peace. The apocryphal story goes that in 1775, Quakers in a Friends meeting house in Easton, New York were faced by a tribe of Indians on the war path. Rather than flee, the Quakers fell silent and waited. The Indian chief came into the meeting house and finding no weapons he declared the Quakers as friends. On leaving he took a white feather from his quiver and attached it to the door as a sign to leave the building unharmed.

In 1937 the Peace Pledge Union sold 500 white feather badges as symbols of peace.

== Criticism ==
Among other matters, such campaigns in World War I were unpopular among soldiers, not least because even soldiers who were home on leave could find themselves presented with feathers. Some persons who volunteered to enlist but were rejected on medical and other grounds were also presented white feathers. In Australia this led to the formation of groups such as the Rejected Volunteers' Association and the Australian Patriots' League, and the wearing of a badge to recognise their patriotism. Other men were not of enlistment age, or performing other important war work and therefore were no reasonable target of the White Feather campaign.

In her 1938 essay Three Guineas on war and women, writer Virginia Woolf expressed her opinion that the white feather campaign was less an actual female act of patriotism but rather a reflection of male hysteria.

== 21st century ==
In the 21st century, the meaning of a white feather as a symbol of cowardice is almost entirely limited to historical reference—especially tied to World War I—or to metaphor in literature or film. Outside of these contexts, most people would not make the connection.

== In popular culture ==
=== Literature ===
- The Four Feathers (1902), an adventure novel, tells of Harry, an officer in the British Army, who resigns his commission the day before his regiment is dispatched to fight in the Mahdist War in Sudan. Three fellow officers, as well as his fiancée, each send him a white feather. Stung by the criticism, Harry sails to Sudan, disguises himself as an Arab, and looks for the opportunity to redeem his honour. The novel has been the basis of at least seven films, including The Four Feathers (2002). It was parodied in the Dad's Army episode "The Two and a Half Feathers".
- The 1907 P. G. Wodehouse novel The White Feather is a school story about cowardice and the efforts a boy goes to redeem himself by learning boxing.

=== Music ===
- In 2009, "White Feather" was released as the third single from the Wolfmother album entitled Cosmic Egg.
- In 1985, progressive rock band Marillion released an anti-war song called "White Feather" as the end track to their album Misplaced Childhood.
- In 1983, new wave band Kajagoogoo released their debut album called White Feathers, whose opener was the title track, a light-hearted allegory for weak people.

=== Comics ===
- DC Comics' spoof superhero team the Inferior Five includes a cowardly archer named White Feather. He was intended as a reference to DC Comics' more heroic character Green Arrow and similar "super archer" characters.

== Other meanings ==
In the United States, the white feather has also become a symbol of courage, persistence, and superior combat marksmanship. Its most notable wearer was US Marine Corps Gunnery Sergeant Carlos Hathcock, who was awarded the Silver Star medal for bravery during the Vietnam War. Hathcock picked up a white feather on a mission and wore it in his hat to taunt the enemy. He was so feared by enemy troops that they put a price on his head. Its wear on combat headgear flaunts an insultingly easy target for enemy snipers.

== See also ==
- Prince of Wales's feathers
