= List of works by A. E. W. Mason =

English novelist and playwright (1865–1948)

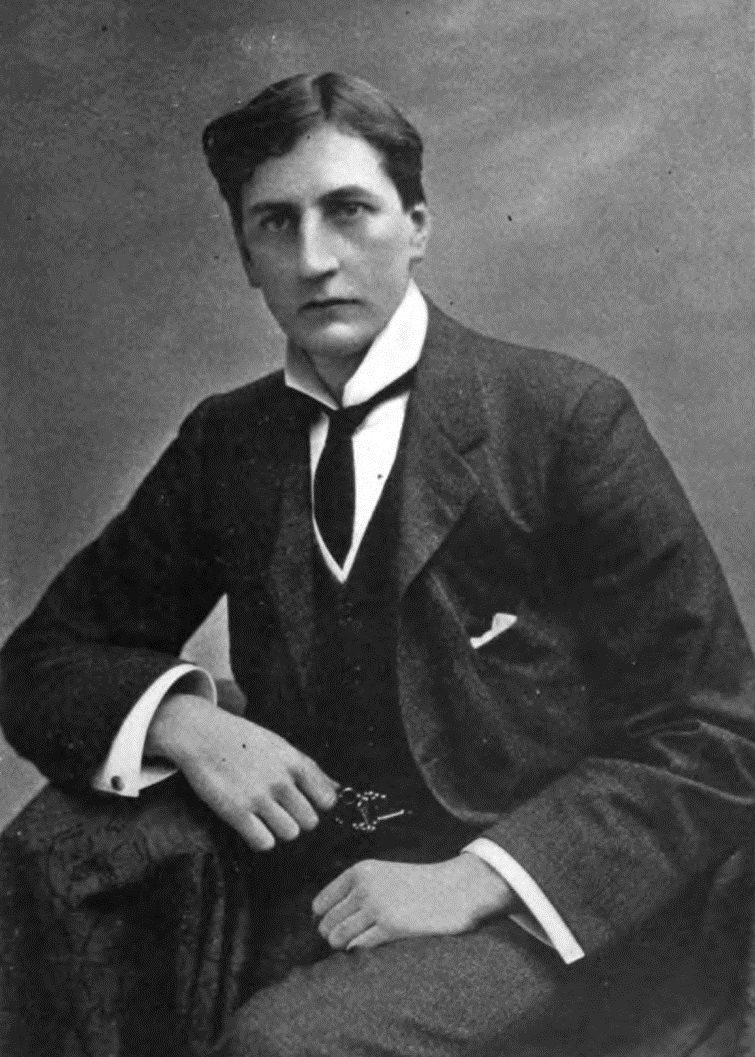
- Born: Alfred Edward Woodley Mason; 7 May 1865; Dulwich, London, England
- Died: 22 November 1948 (aged 83); London, England
- Occupation: Author
- Writing career
- Language: English

Alfred Edward Woodley Mason (7 May 1865 – 22 November 1948), known as A. E. W. Mason, was an English novelist, playwright, actor, army officer, intelligence agent and – for a short period – a politician. He is best remembered for his 1902 novel of courage and cowardice in wartime, The Four Feathers, and as the creator of Inspector Hanaud, a French detective who was an early template for Agatha Christie's Hercule Poirot.

Mason's prolific output included over 30 novels as well as plays, short stories and articles. Many of his novels were adapted for the screen, several multiples times. During the 1910s and 1920s he worked closely with many film directors of the silent era.

== Inspector Hanaud novels ==
Inspector Hanaud novels
Title	Year of first publication	Notes
At the Villa Rose	1910	Novel
The Affair at the Semiramis Hotel	1917	Novella. First published as a long story in The Story-Teller magazine for March 1917, and collected in The Four Corners of the World, Hodder and Stoughton 1917. In the US it was published as a standalone book by Charles Scribner's Sons.
The House of the Arrow	1924	Novel
The Prisoner in the Opal	1928	Novel
They Wouldn't be Chessmen	1935	Novel
The House in Lordship Lane	1946	Novel

Hanaud also features in the short story The Ginger King (1940), and makes a brief appearance in The Sapphire (1933). The 1931 volume A. E. W. Mason Omnibus: Inspector Hanaud's Investigations is a collection of the first three novels with an introduction by the author.

== Other novels ==
Other novels
Title	Year of first publication	Notes	Ref.
A Romance of Wastdale	1895	Novel	
The Courtship of Maurice Buckler	1896	Novel	
The Philanderers	1897	Novel	
Lawrence Clavering	1897	Novel	
Miranda of the Balcony	1899	Novel	
The Watchers	1899	Novel	
Parson Kelly	1900	Novel, with Andrew Lang	
Clementina	1901	Novel	
The Four Feathers	1902	Novel	
The Truants	1904	Novel	
Running Water	1907	Novel	
The Broken Road	1907	Novel	
The Turnstile	1912	Novel	
The Witness for the Defence	1913	Novel	
The Summons	1920	Novel	
The Winding Stair	1923	Novel	
No Other Tiger	1927	Novel	
The Dean's Elbow	1930	Novel	
The Three Gentlemen	1932	Novel	
The Sapphire	1933	Novel	
Fire Over England	1936	Novel	
The Drum	1937	Novel	
Königsmark	1938	Novel	
Musk and Amber	1942	Novel	

== Short story collections ==
Short story collections
Title	Year of first publication	Notes	Ref.
Ensign Knightley, and Other Stories	1901	Short stories	
The Four Corners of the World	1917	Short stories	
Dilemmas	1934	Short stories	

== Plays ==
Plays
Title	Year of first printed publication	First London performance (except where indicated)	Notes	Ref.
Blanche de Malétroit	1894	Ladbroke Hall, 30 June 1894		
The Courtship of Maurice Buckler	-	Grand, Islington, 6 December 1897	With Isabel Bateman	
Marjorie Strode	-	The Playhouse, 19 March 1908		
Colonel Smith	1909	St James's, 23 April 1909	Privately printed	
Green Stockings	1910	Thirty Ninth Street Theatre, New York, 2 October 1911	Final version of Colonel Smith	
The Princess Clementina	-	The Queen's, 14 December 1910	With George Pleydell Bancroft	
The Witness for the Defence	1911, 1913	St James's, 1 February 1911	Privately printed 1911	
Open Windows	-	St James's, 11 March 1913		
At the Villa Rose	1928	Strand, 10 July 1920		
Running Water	-	Wyndham's, 5 April 1922		
The House of the Arrow	-	Vaudeville, 11 May 1928		
No Other Tiger	-	St James's, 26 December 1928		
A Present from Margate	1934	Shaftesbury, 14 December 1933	With Ian Hay	

An adaptation by Anne Crawford Flexnor of the novel Miranda of the Balcony was performed in New York in 1901, and at The Empire Theatre Huddersfield on 2 September 1901.

== Uncollected Short Stories ==
Uncollected Short Stories
Title	Publication and date	Ref.
An Inconvenience of Habit	Literature, 15 Jul 1899	
The Right Thing	The Argus, 28 Mar 1900	
The Vicar's Conversion	Strand Magazine, Dec 1900	
The Trouble at Beaulieu	Lippincott's Magazine, 19 Jan 1901	
The Schoolmaster and Felicia	Mr Punch's Holiday Book 1901	
The Picture in the Bath	Illustrated London News, Christmas Extra number 1901	
The Man from Socotra	Illustrated London News, 22 Nov 1902	
The Guide	Daily Mail 1904 (reprinted in The Old Volume Annual 1908)	
Dimoussi and the Pistol	London Magazine, Sep 1905	
The Great Monopoly	Metropolitan Magazine, 1906	
The Silver Flask	Metropolitan Magazine, Jul 1907	
Making Good	Cornhill Magazine, Jan 1910	
The Silver Ship	Metropolitan Magazine, Jan 1917	
The Sapphire	Pall Mall Magazine, May 1927	
The Last Salute	Collier's, 15 May 1937	
The Ear	Strand Magazine, Jun 1937	
The Conjurer	The Queen's Book of the Red Cross 1939	
The Secret Fear	Strand Magazine, Apr 1940	
The Ginger King	Strand Magazine, Aug 1940	
The Watch	Homes and Gardens, Jun 1945	
Not in the Log	Strand Magazine, May 1948	
Rodin's Poseur	(Unpublished)	

== Non-fiction ==
Non-fiction
Title	Year of first publication	Notes	Ref.
The Royal Exchange	1920	Privately printed	
Sir George Alexander and the St James's Theatre	1935	Biography	
The Life of Francis Drake	1941	Biography	

== Film and TV adaptations ==
This is a list of adaptations by other writers of works by A. E. W. Mason.

Film and TV adaptations
Title	Year	Directed by	Based on (novel unless specified)	Notes
Princess Clementina	1911	William Barker	Clementina	Silent
Four Feathers	1915	J. Searle Dawley	The Four Feathers	Silent
Green Stockings	1916	Wilfrid North	Green Stockings (play)	Silent
The Witness for the Defense	1919	George Fitzmaurice	The Witness for the Defence	Silent
At the Villa Rose	1920	Maurice Elvey	At the Villa Rose	Silent
A Romance of Wastdale	1921	Maurice Elvey	A Romance of Wastdale	Silent
The Broken Road	1921	René Plaissetty	The Broken Road	Silent
The Four Feathers	1921	René Plaissetty	The Four Feathers	Silent
Running Water	1922	Maurice Elvey	Running Water	Silent
The Truants	1922	Sinclair Hill	The Truants	Silent
Slaves of Destiny	1924	Maurice Elvey	Miranda of the Balcony	Silent
The Winding Stair	1925	John Griffith Wray	The Winding Stair	Silent
Slightly Used	1927	Archie Mayo	Green Stockings (play)	
The Four Feathers	1929	Merian C. Cooper, Lothar Mendes, Ernest B. Schoedsack	The Four Feathers	Silent
At the Villa Rose	1930	Leslie S. Hiscott	At the Villa Rose	Mystery at the Villa Rose in the United States
Le mystère de la villa rose	1930	René Hervil and Louis Mercanton	At the Villa Rose	
The House of the Arrow	1930	Leslie S. Hiscott	The House of the Arrow	
La Maison de la Fléche	1930	Henri Fescourt	The House of the Arrow	
The Flirting Widow	1930	William A. Seiter	Green Stockings (play)	
Her Imaginary Lover	1933	George King	Green Stockings (play)	
The Widow from Monte Carlo	1935	Arthur Greville Collins	A Present from Margate (play)	
Fire Over England	1937	William K. Howard	Fire Over England	
The Drum	1938	Zoltan Korda	The Drum	
The Four Feathers	1939	Zoltan Korda	The Four Feathers	
At the Villa Rose	1940	Walter Summers	At the Villa Rose	Also known as House of Mystery
The House of the Arrow	1940	Harold French	The House of the Arrow	
At the Villa Rose	1948	Gilbert Thomas (writer)		TV film
The House of the Arrow	1953	Michael Anderson	The House of the Arrow	
Clementina	1954	Joy Harington	Clementina	TV series
Storm Over the Nile	1955	Terence Young and Zoltan Korda	The Four Feathers	
The Crystal Trench	4 Oct 1959	Alfred Hitchcock	The Crystal Trench (short story)	Episode of Alfred Hitchcock Presents
The Four Feathers	1978	Don Sharp	The Four Feathers	TV film
The Four Feathers	2002	Shekhar Kapur	The Four Feathers	

== Bibliography ==
- Green, Roger Lancelyn (1952). A. E. W. Mason. London: Max Parrish.
- Barzun, Jacques; Taylor, Wendall Hertig (1989). A Catalogue of Crime (2nd ed.). New York: Harper & Row. ISBN 0-06-015796-8.
