= Running Water =

Running water usually refers to:

- Tap water, water supplied through a tap, a water dispenser valve.
- Runoff (hydrology), the flow of water across the earth
- Running waters, an ecological habitat contrasted to standing waters

Running Water may also refer to:

== Places ==
- Running Water, Tennessee, the former name of Whiteside, Tennessee
- Running Water, South Dakota, a census-designated place
- Running Water Draw, a river in Texas
- Running Water Stage Station, a former stop on a stage coach route in Wyoming
- Running Water Farm, a farm and gathering-place in North Carolina

== Entertainment ==
- Running Water (film), a 1922 British silent film
- Running Water (novel), a 1906 novel by A.E.W. Mason
- "Running Water" (song), a song by the Moody Blues from their 1983 album The Present
- "Running Water", a song by Daniel Johnston from his 1983 album Hi, How Are You

== Horse ==
- Running Water (horse), an American Thoroughbred racemare

== See also ==
- Drinking water
- Massacre of Running Waters
- Water supply
