= The Winding Stair =

The Winding Stair may refer to:

- The Winding Stair (band), a musical group from Belfast, Northern Ireland
- The Winding Stair (film), a 1925 American silent drama film based on the 1923 novel
- The Winding Stair (novel), a 1923 novel by A. E. W. Mason
- The Winding Stair and Other Poems, a 1933 volume of poems by W. B. Yeats
- The Winding Stair (subtitled Francis Bacon, His Rise and Fall by Daphne du Maurier (1976)
- "The Winding Stair Mountain Blues", a 2017 song by Turnpike Troubadours from the album A Long Way from Your Heart
- The Winding Stair a novel by Jesse Norman (2023)
