= Winding Stair =

Winding Stair may refer to:

- The Winding Stair, a band from Belfast, Northern Ireland
- The Winding Stair, a 1923 novel by A. E. W. Mason
- The Winding Stair a 1925 silent film based on the novel
- Winding Stair Mountain National Recreation Area, located in Oklahoma
- The Winding Stair and Other Poems, a volume of poetry by W. B. Yeats

== See also ==
- Spiral staircases, a 'winding' helical type of stairway
