= Lancelyn Green =

Lancelyn Green is a surname. Notable people with the surname include:

- Richard Lancelyn Green (1953–2004), British scholar, son of Roger
- Roger Lancelyn Green (1918–1987), British writer
