= The Truants =

The Truants may refer to:

- The Truants (novel), a 1904 novel by A.E.W. Mason
- The Truants (film), a 1922 film directed by Sinclair Hill
