= Turnstile (disambiguation) =

A turnstile is a pedestrian gate.

Turnstile may also refer to:

== Music ==
- Turnstiles (album), a 1976 studio album by Billy Joel
- Turnstile (band), a hardcore punk band

== Fiction ==
- The Turnstile, a 1912 novel by A. E. W. Mason
- In the fiction movie Tenet, a device that inverts entropy

== Science and technology ==
- Turnstile (symbol), symbol used in mathematics, logic, and computer science
- Turnstile, a CAPTCHA product by Cloudflare
- Turnstile antenna, set of two dipole antennas
- Optical turnstile, physical security device

== Other ==
- TURNSTILE, a codename for the UK's Central Government War Headquarters

== See also ==
- Turn Style, retail store
- Turnstyle (band), a band from Perth, Western Australia
