= Richard Lancelyn Green =

British scholar (1953–2004)

- Born: Richard Gordon Lancelyn Green; 10 July 1953; Bebington, Cheshire, England
- Died: 27 March 2004 (aged 50)
- Occupations: Scholar, editor, writer

Richard Gordon Lancelyn Green (10 July 1953 – 27 March 2004) was a British scholar of Arthur Conan Doyle and Sherlock Holmes, and was generally considered the world's foremost scholar of these topics.

== Background ==
Lancelyn Green was born in Bebington, Cheshire, England, the younger son of Roger Lancelyn Green and June, daughter of Sidney Herbert Burdett. His father was an author known for his popular adaptations of the Arthurian, Robin Hood and Homeric myths, and his mother was a drama teacher and adjudicator. The Lancelyn Green family had been lords of the manor of Poulton-Lancelyn in Cheshire since at least 1093; Randle Greene [sic] had married Elizabeth, daughter and heiress of William Lancelyn, in the reign of Elizabeth I.

Lancelyn Green attended Bradfield College in Berkshire, and then University College, Oxford, where he earned a degree in English. After leaving university, he travelled extensively, throughout Europe, India and South-east Asia.

== Scholarly pursuits ==
Lancelyn Green was a collector of Sherlock Holmes-related material, and was co-editor of the first comprehensive bibliography of Arthur Conan Doyle, A Bibliography of A. Conan Doyle, with John Michael Gibson, and also a series of collections of Doyle's writings that had never before been collected in book form: Uncollected Stories (1982), Essays on Photography (1982), and Letters to the Press (1986), all co-edited with Gibson. The Conan Doyle bibliography earned Lancelyn Green and Gibson a Special Edgar Award from the Mystery Writers of America during 1984.

Lancelyn Green also published other books on his own. The Uncollected Sherlock Holmes (1983) anthologised Doyle's non-canon Sherlock Holmes writings, The Further Adventures of Sherlock Holmes (1985) is a collection of Holmes pastiches, and Letters to Sherlock Holmes (1985) collected the most interesting of letters to Sherlock Holmes, arriving at the headquarters of the Abbey National Building Society, whose address in Baker Street was the closest to the fictional "221B".

Lancelyn Green was something of a showman, appearing as a 19th-century music hall master of ceremonies at events of the Sherlock Holmes Society, of which he was chairman from 1996 to 1999, and dressing in period costume to visit Reichenbach Falls, where Sherlock Holmes was thought to have died until Conan Doyle "resurrected" him eight years later. For his encyclopaedic knowledge of Arthur Conan Doyle and Sherlock Holmes, and for his scholarly works, he was well regarded among scholars of Holmes.

Later in life, Lancelyn Green worked extensively on notes and collecting material for a planned three-volume biography of Conan Doyle, which remained unfinished at the time of his death. He lamented the legal wranglings needed to gain rights to Conan Doyle's private papers and manuscripts, which were planned to be sold at an auction.

During August 2004, it was announced that Lancelyn Green had bequeathed his extensive collection on Conan Doyle to the Portsmouth Library Service. Lancelyn Green had chosen the city because Conan Doyle had a medical practice there, and it was where the two first Sherlock Holmes books were written. Had Portsmouth declined the collection, Green's will stated the archive should instead be given to libraries in Edinburgh, Doyle's home town.

== The collection ==
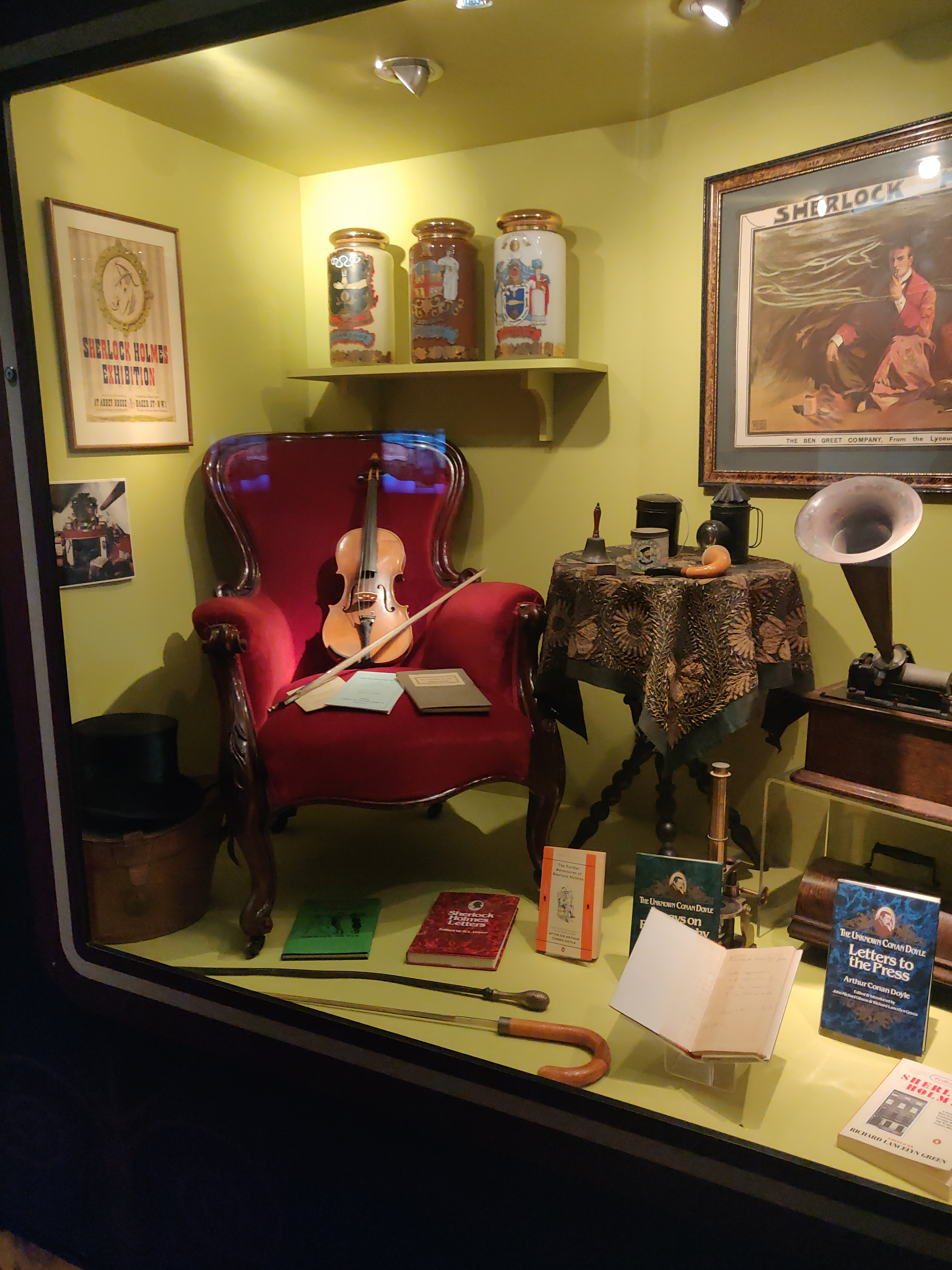
A recreation of 221B Baker Street, part of the RLG collection at Portsmouth Museum and Art Gallery.

As early as the age of seven years, Lancelyn Green began his collection of Sherlockiana, and created his version of 221B Baker Street in an attic room at Poulton Hall, gleaning material for a few shillings at junk shops and from the family's own Victoriana. Later he began to assemble his literary collection, and would add any edition of Doyle's output, as well as posters, ephemera and novelty items with a Sherlock Holmes theme or Doyle association.

By the date of his death Lancelyn Green had been collecting voraciously for more than 40 years and without doubt possessed the largest collection of Doyleiana that existed privately (and probably the largest such collection that ever could exist now that it has been bequeathed to the City of Portsmouth). The collection is now held by the Portsmouth City Museum where exhibitions have created much interest. The patron of the collection is Stephen Fry.

== Last days and aftermath ==
Lancelyn Green suspected that the Conan Doyle papers being auctioned at Christie's were part of a collection that Dame Jean Conan Doyle, the author's daughter, actually wanted the British Library to have. He attempted to stop the auction, but was unsuccessful.

In the weeks before his death, he told friends and journalists that an unidentified American was following him, and that he feared his opposition to the auction could endanger his life. His behaviour became increasingly erratic, and once he insisted on speaking to a visitor in the garden because he said his apartment was bugged.

During the night of his death, his sister telephoned his apartment, obtaining only his answering machine, which had a new message with an American voice (this was found later to be the standard message tape supplied with the machine). Her worries about this resulted in the discovery of Lancelyn Green's body, face down on his bed, garrotted with a shoelace that had been tightened with the handle of a wooden spoon.

Murder was suspected, and there was some newspaper gossip. Because the Criminal Investigation Department (CID) was not called at the start, any evidence that might have been useful for a murder enquiry had been disturbed or removed during the course of dealing with the body.

The coroner returned an open verdict. Many of Lancelyn Green's best friends thought it was not in his nature to kill himself. However, some thought the death to have been an elaborate suicide, intended to seem like murder, to cast suspicion upon one of his rivals. This replicates the plot of one of the last Sherlock Holmes mysteries, "The Problem of Thor Bridge", in which a woman dies by suicide in a manner meant to implicate the woman with whom her husband had been flirting.

Lancelyn Green's death inspired the December 2004 New Yorker article "Mysterious Circumstances" by David Grann.

Lancelyn Green's bizarre death later inspired a novel that deals with a fictional Holmes expert who dies in exactly the same manner as Lancelyn Green. The Sherlockian (2010) by Graham Moore features a Holmes expert and a missing Doyle manuscript.

In 2019, a play called Mysterious Circumstances, both whose title and subject matter were inspired by the 2004 New Yorker article, premiered at the UCLA Geffen Playhouse. Starring Alan Tudyk and written by Michael Mitnick, the story unravels Lancelyn Green's passion and obsession with Sir Arthur Conan Doyle and Sherlock Holmes and his mysterious death – an alleged murder – which Holmes himself then sets about solving.

== See also ==
- List of unsolved deaths
