= The Three Gentlemen =

1932 novel by A. E. W. Mason

- First edition
- Author: A. E. W. Mason
- Language: English
- Publisher: Hodder & Stoughton
- Publication date: 1932
- Publication place: England, Italy
- Media type: Print
- Pages: 319

The Three Gentlemen is a 1932 novel of adventure and romance by A. E. W. Mason, published by Hodder & Stoughton. It follows the story of a young couple in ancient Roman times whose love spans the centuries as they are reincarnated in the Elizabethan era, and finally in the early 20th century.

== Plot ==
=== Part 1 ===
Attilius Scaurus, a young citizen of Hadrian's Rome, has run up debts and is in danger of bringing his prominent family into disrepute. To avoid a scandal, the family arrange for Attilius to be conscripted into the army and put into the care of a relative, the Legate of the Sixth Legion, stationed at York. Attilius spends several years helping to supervise the construction of the wall, and several more on the road later to be known as Stane Street. One day, at work on the South Downs, Attilius is approached by Prasutacus, a wealthy Briton, who invites him home to dine. Although Attilius is suspicious of Britons who are "more Roman than the Romans" he accepts, and that evening meets the man's daughter Sergia. The couple fall in love, and continue to meet in secret while Attilius's legion works in the area. Then the legion moves on, and the couple do not see each other for four years.

When the legion is finally ordered back to Rome, Attilius and Sergia covertly meet once again at their old trysting place. But Prasutacus has heard rumours that the Romans are about to leave Britain for good, and concludes that he can now deal with his daughter's lover without danger of retribution. He captures Attilius and has him murdered. But before he dies Attilius promises Sergia "another life, in other days".

=== Part 2 ===
As a boy growing up in the mid 16th century, Anthony Scarr had always known things about the Romans that he had not knowingly learned. Now a fashionable young lawyer at Gray's Inn, he has offered to help with the elaborate preparations that are being made for a visit of Queen Elizabeth to the home of Lord Montague, the father of a friend. As Anthony rehearses his part in the proposed entertainment, he meets Sylvia Buckhust, the daughter of a local landowner. The pair immediately recognise each other. They spend time in a secluded bower on the Downs, the same trysting place that had been used hundreds of years earlier.

The Queen takes a liking to Anthony and favours him, but is jealous when she hears that he loves another. She humiliates Sylvia in public, provoking an insult from Anthony. Now in fear of his life, Anthony prepares to flee, but is prevented by Sir Francis Walsingham who asks him to undertake a private mission spying on the court of King Phillip in Spain.

When the Spanish Armada sails for England in 1588 Anthony is on one of the ships, posing as an Italian soldier. He destroys the vessel by throwing a torch into the magazine, is caught and is hanged. When Walsingham breaks the news to Sylvia she weeps but feels a presence with her in the room.

=== Part 3 ===
Adrian Shard's father had always hoped that his son would go into politics. After completing his studies at Oxford, Adrian secures a post as private secretary to Spencer Cratton, a Cabinet Minister. Coincidentally his lodgings overlook the rear of Cratton's house in London's Grosvenor Street. Arriving home late one evening, he sees through the French windows Cratton talking to a man he later recognises as the notorious financier George Andros; and he sees a young woman evidently ill at ease. She is Sonia Challice, Cratton's stepdaughter and Adrian's ancient soul mate.

Some months later, newspapers report the illegal manipulation of a stock price, and demand that the culprit be found. Looking out after dark from his lodgings Adrian can see into the room in Cratton's house that serves as his own office, and with Sonia and two other witnesses he sees Andros planting incriminating documents in his desk.

Adrian tells Cratton that he and Sonia wish to marry. Cratton and Sonia's mother had intended to force Sonia to marry Andros, but they give way when they understand that Adrian has evidence of criminal wrongdoing. Adrian and Sonia marry and travel to Rome on honeymoon. As Adrian looks out across the city he is puzzled by what he thinks is a new building - the dome of St Peter's: it was the first time he had seen Rome for eighteen hundred years.

== Literary significance and criticism ==
Mason had discussed the original idea for the book with his friend Rudyard Kipling, and consulted him as the story neared completion. Kipling was enthusiastic.

Reviewing the first edition for The Sunday Times, Ralph Straus considered the book to be "frankly, a disappointment", with little to distinguish it from other treatments of metempsychosis. He was unconvinced by the slender thread which binds three variations of the same story, and found himself not deeply moved. Mason's biographer Roger Lancelyn Green, however, writing in 1952, reported that the book was well received on its appearance, and that it continued to be one of Mason's most popular tales.

Green's own view was that The Three Gentlemen does not reach the high level that its inspiration seemed to warrant, with the third section amounting to merely a chapter in the story of reincarnations rather than, as it could have been, the culmination of the Roman and Elizabethan sections. Nevertheless, he considered the book to be of considerable importance in Mason's literary career, and one that, as a story of adventure, does not fail.

== Bibliography ==
- Green, Roger Lancelyn (1952). A. E. W. Mason. London: Max Parrish.
