= RFD (magazine) =

American reader-written LGBTQ magazine

- Editor: RFD Collective
- Categories: Queer lifestyle magazine
- Frequency: Quarterly
- Publisher: RFD Press, Inc.
- First issue: Autumn 1974
- Country: US
- Based in: Hadley, MA
- Language: English
- Website: www.rfdmag.org
- ISSN: 0149-709X

RFD is a reader-written quarterly magazine celebrating queer diversity. Since its founding in 1974 as a publication for rural gays and alternative lifestyles, the magazine has been edited by different communities in various U.S. locations. While predating the Radical Faeries, the magazine and the movement have long been associated. Notable writers featured in RFD include the poet Essex Hemphill.

== History ==
The magazine began with a group of gay male Iowans who attempted to place an advertisement in the countercultural Mother Earth News, about organizing the gay-centered commune Running Water Farm. The ad was rejected on the grounds that the magazine did not run gay-themed advertisements.

The initial organizers of the commune began pursuing publication of their own magazine, as a means of communicating with other rural collectives and gay men living outside of cities. Stewart Scofield presented this idea to the Rural Caucus of the first Midwest Gay Pride Conference in Iowa City in May 1974. By that fall, a collective of gay men centered in Iowa City had developed the magazine, and arranged with the Women's Press there to print it. The publication's first mailing address was in Grinnell, Iowa, where Scofield lived.

According to Donald Engstrom, one of the early Iowa-based founders, the collective wrote and sent copies of the early issues to every gay campus group they could find, as well as to their gay friends in other areas.

Described in issue #6 as "a collective of Iowa faggots", the early founders published RFD for its first two years. When lovers Carl Wittman and Allan Troxler moved to Wolf Creek, Oregon they became part of a collective there, where the magazine was subsequently published for many years. The publication's production moved to North Carolina's Running Water Farm in 1980, followed by Short Mountain Sanctuary in Liberty, Tennessee in the mid-1980s, then since 2009 to a small collective associated with Faerie Camp Destiny in New England.

=== Name ===
The publication's formal name is simply RFD, although it has alternatively been billed as "a country journal by gay men," "for country faggots everywhere," and later identified as "a reader-written quarterly celebrating queer diversity". The title originally evoked the well-known abbreviation for Rural Free Delivery, the residential mail service provided by the USPS beginning in the early 1900s, reflecting the "country living" aesthetic of the magazine. Later, as the magazine came to be associated with the counterculture Radical Faeries movement, the name became widely presumed as an abbreviation of Radical Faerie Digest (itself an ironic take on the mainstream Reader's Digest). In reality the publishers have adopted the practice of assigning a new expansion of the initials to each issue, such as Really Feeling Divine (issue 3, Spring 1975), Rejoicing in Flamboyant Diversity (issue 50, Spring 1987), or Resist Fascist Demagogues (issue 80, Winter 1994).

== Contents ==
RFD "is a reader-written journal for gay people which focuses on country living and encourages alternative lifestyles." Having begun publication 1974, RFD is the oldest reader-written gay quarterly magazine. The business and general production are coordinated by a volunteer collective publishing the magazine in Hadley, Massachusetts.

The development of the radical faeries involved the convergence of a number of distinct social trends in the 1970s. RFD magazine started in 1974, during a time Becky Thompson cites as a major moment in which affinity groups came together to protest the oppression they experienced due to their intersectional identities. RFD works to create queer communities in rural areas, a goal that was not acknowledged by hetero-activists before them. The socialist and feminist movement came together in the development of an ideology of gay male egalitarianism that remains a central part of the radical faeries culture. As the radical faerie movement gained ground, radical faeries used RFD to promote various gatherings and other radical faerie events.

The Summer 2004 edition, RFD's 118th issue, is titled, "30+ What Does the Future Hold". In this edition, RFD discusses how the magazine defines itself and navigates between rural and city environments. In the Between the Lines section at the beginning of the magazine, editors wrote:

"Ever wonder who the "RFD Collective" is? Surprise! We all are. Be you in the country, the city or some other planet, if you read/write/design for this publication, you have a vested interest in its success. Being one of many voices for the queer community, a place for us to explore and express ourselves, RFD has been gifted with many talented journalists, editors, and artists…."

The magazine also became a venue to publicize announcements about important events in the rural gay community. As a reader-written work, RFD relies on the experiences and thoughts of its subscribers, keeping the magazine fluid and changing based on its readership. Large portions of early issues offer dialogue between reader and writer, as in recurring sections for "Brothers Behind Bars", in addition to various personal advertisements. Magazine sections have varied since inception, having included horoscopes, cooking advice, gardening, the self-help column "Agnes Knows Strictly", articles and essays, book reviews, contact letters, fiction, humor, politics, and obituaries.

Magazine contents remain largely influenced by its audience, with regular calls for artwork, creative writing, and think pieces from readers.

== Political shifts and queer experience ==
Articles in RFD interact with the political climate of the time. RFD advocated for rusticity in order to highlight gay men of different socioeconomic classes to change narratives surrounding normative ideologies and U.S.-based capitalism. RFD itself was known to often be under financial stress. RFD's representation of counterculture allowed for gay men to consider rustic living outside of the normative gay male culture.

=== Brothers Behind Bars ===
"Brothers Behind Bars" was a section of the magazine facilitating pen pals with men imprisoned for being homosexual. The editors sought to remind readers of their vulnerability to arrest, particularly highlighting this risk to its rural readership: "anti-gay laws are most often enforced in small towns and rural areas, away from the group power of organized gayness." RFD framed these inmate interactions as a platform where they could bring "victims of this injustice" and "potential victims" together in order to fight against this specific form of oppression against homosexual men. Editors discontinued Brothers Behind Bars in 1987, then reintroduced the section in the Summer issue of 1990.

=== Transgender rights ===
RFD began to become more intersectional in its approach to acknowledging identity politics around 1999.

"Ironically the gay community, despite all of its past persecutions, is intolerant towards some of its own subgroups, displaying toward them cruel self-righteousness that mirrors the bigotry of Christians toward all sodomites. I am referring particularly to the intolerance that many mainstream gays have for transvestites and shemales, those whose inner urgings draw them into a life between genders… I have written this article in hopes that others, perhaps even one person, will respond in a similar vein… we may find networks of support to foster our sense of independence and self esteem."

Acknowledging the lack of representation for gender queer individuals who are a part of the RFD community and beyond, the piece makes a call to action, asking that readers of RFD create a safer space for gender queer people within the magazine.

=== Recognizing privilege ===
Writers in RFD expressed the need for intersectionality in the forms of class, race, gender, and sexuality by discussing the separation between class lines which occurs in queer communities.

"I have learned that the Gay and Lesbian Community is not interested in playing on the same field as straight or gay working class Americans, much less people of color, people in poverty, or - Harvey Milk forbid - third world peoples... However, in spite of our fine intentions, our own privilege and prejudices continue to invade our attitudes and actions… Someone from a much lower class background than most of us would likely have to navigate a lot of weird unchecked prejudices in order to benefit from the sanctuary we provide."

The author acknowledges their own privilege and later acknowledges the struggle for those with identities whose oppression goes beyond exclusively homophobia and/or misogyny.

=== Rural to urban ===
RFD started as a magazine made for, and produced by, queer men in rural communities. Queer communities have remained firmly located in the urban, particularly the metropolitan, and have only recently become more acknowledged in the countryside. Despite the fact that queer people are located around the globe and throughout the United States, LGBTQ publications have been primarily focused on urban queer life.

Over time, readers noticed RFD targeting a more urbanized reader. This shift happened in the early 2000s, and came about as a result of the Radical Faerie Movement. A piece in Summer 2005 explored the urban aspect of the readership.

"Give me your tired, poor-ole drag queens,/ Your huddled faeries yearning to breathe free,/ The radical refuse of queers who have more,/ Send these, the freaks, tempest tossed to me,/ I lift my lamp guiding them to sanctuary."

Although the magazine maintains its rural location of Hadley, Massachusetts, it recognizes the need for inter-community connection and consciousness raising.

=== Ongoing shifts ===
In fall 2004 RFD published two particularly political essays: "Why Soldiers Rape and Why Gay Men Should Care" focusing on rape culture in the military; and "The Federal Marriage Amendment Counter Curse," a call for queer communities to vote against an amendment to the United States marriage policy.

"When the President and every radically conservative organization in the country decided to declare war against queer people by trying to amend the constitution of the United States… This November we will go to vote, and voting is a magikal act - one of the most transformative acts possible in a democratic… The proposed Constitutional amendment is at right. Burn it. Banish it. Tell it that it doesn’t exist in this world… Replace it with a vision of love. Talk to people, tell them that a vicious hateful thing is happening, and that we can’t allow it to continue. Cast a spell in the ballot box and vote against hate. Wake up, get out and change the world."

== Archives ==
Over 50 archives around the world have copies of the RFD magazine, however, only three of these archives are complete. RFD has sent out a call for people with copies of the work to contribute to this archival project. The publication is also making an effort to digitize each of the RFD issues. An archive of the magazine covers published between 1974 and 2012 can be found at the Radical Faerie organization website.

== See also ==
- List of LGBTQ periodicals
