= Musk and Amber =

1942 novel by A. E. W. Mason

- First edition
- Author: A. E. W. Mason
- Cover artist: Bip Pares
- Language: English
- Genre: Adventure
- Set in: England and Italy
- Publisher: Hodder & Stoughton (UK); Doubleday, Doran (US)
- Publication date: 16 April 1942
- Publication place: UK
- Media type: Print
- Pages: 318

Musk and Amber is a 1942 adventure novel by A. E. W. Mason, set in Eighteenth-century England and Italy. It was his penultimate work, written at the age of 76, and has been considered his very best.

== Plot ==
The opera aficionado James Elliot had been a regular visitor to Grest Park, the English country house owned by his friend the music-loving Lord Scoble, Earl of Linchcombe. After Scoble's death, his title had passed to his young son Julian along with legal ownership of the estate, the latter being administered by the boy's much older half-sister Lady Frances Scoble.

Lady Frances invites Elliot once again to stay at Grest Park, and seeks his opinion on the management of the 12 year-old Julian, who seems disturbed. Julian has an exceptional singing voice and has had lessons from Mr Handel himself. Elliot advises that the musical training started by his father should continue, but Frances and her cousin Henry Scoble are reluctant to take the boy's gift seriously.

A year later, on a visit to Naples, Elliot comes across an appreciative crowd that has gathered to listen to a young singer he recognises immediately as Julian. He overhears Frances and Henry, whom he now realises are lovers, apparently plotting some scheme. That night Julian disappears, and nearly two weeks later a boy's body is dredged from the bay. After a brief period of mourning Frances and Henry marry, and soon a son is born. Henry becomes the new Earl of Linchcombe and is appointed government minister.

Julian, however, had not drowned but had been kidnapped to order, on payment of a fee. He had been taken to a hovel high in the hills where his captors, hoping to make even more money from their prisoner, had persuaded him to sing to them: "But he had sung his sweet song too well. They did not let him go out and two days later the barber came up the hill from Naples."

When Julian reads a report of Henry Scoble's new title, he smells "the musk and amber of revenge" and decides that he must dedicate himself to his singing. He enters a conservatory for young castratos, graduating at the age of eighteen under the stage name of Marelli. A hugely successful opera singer, Marelli's career flourishes and he becomes rich and famous.

Marelli's popularity arouses the jealousy of Maria Baretti, a soprano with whom he is performing in Venice. Her lover is a member of the Council of Ten, a body empowered to impose punishments within the Republic of Venice, and after a public concert Marelli is suddenly arrested and faces the prospect of twelve years imprisonment without trial. Managing to escape from the room is which he is temporarily being held, he makes for the home of James Elliot, now British Minister to the Republic. Afraid that his house is being watched, Elliot arranges to take a few days' holiday, travelling publicly by barge in the style expected of a grand English gentleman. He is accompanied by a masked lady – in fact, by Marelli. Marelli escapes to England, and makes his name there. Elliot eventually retires to England also.

Julian appoints lawyers to investigate his kidnapping years earlier. They discover that Henry Scoble had tried to have Julian murdered, but that Frances had intervened. To her, a quick death would have been too easy for the boy, and she had arranged his kidnapping and sale in the expectation that he would fail as a soprano and that he would be forced to live as an outcast before dying in penury.

Elliot is invited to dine with Frances and Henry at Grest, an obligation he attempts to avoid. Coincidentally, Julian is also headed to Grest that evening, intending to appear unannounced as Marelli. Julian sings, is recognised as the rightful Earl by the servants, and has his revenge by challenging Henry to a duel and running him through. He considers whether he should publish the evidence he holds, take back his house and title and let the law deal with Frances. But after spending an emotional day out with the keeper on the estate, he decides to put Grest itself first. The house needs children whose descendents will grow up amongst its people and farms, loving them and caring for them. This he cannot provide. He returns to Europe and resumes his career as Marelli.

== Title ==
The phrase "The musk and amber of revenge", used throughout the novel, derives from Thomas Browne's Christian Morals. Mason quotes as an epigraph, "Too many there be to whom a dead Enemy smells well, and who find Musk and Amber in Revenge."

== Literary significance and criticism ==
Mason considered the book to have been his best work, an opinion with which later critics have agreed. It was enthusiastically received by the critics on its appearance in 1942 and was made The Book Club society's book of the month, although sales were affected by the paper shortages of the war. Mason's biographer Roger Lancelyn Green, writing ten years later, considered Musk and Amber to have been the very highest point of Mason's literary career, "on the very snow line of great literature."

== Bibliography ==
- Green, Roger Lancelyn (1952). A. E. W. Mason. London: Max Parrish.
