= Listed buildings in Poulton, Bebington =

Poulton is an area to the south of the town of Bebington, Wirral, Merseyside, England. It contains seven buildings that are recorded in the National Heritage List for England as designated listed buildings, all of which are listed at Grade II. This grade is the lowest of the three gradings given to listed buildings and is applied to "buildings of national importance and special interest". The listed buildings consist of farmhouses and farm buildings, a country house and associated buildings, and a pinfold.

Name and location	Photograph	Date	Notes
Pinfold; 53.34147°N 3.00686°W		15th century (probable)	The pinfold consists of a wall about 1.5 metres (4.9 ft) high around an enclosure in the shape of a parallelogram. Facing the road is a gateway flanked by stone piers. Inside is a stone trough sunk into the ground.
Poulton Hall; 53.32713°N 2.99979°W	—	1653	A country house extended to the rear in 1720, again in 1840, and a billiard room was added in the 1880s; has been partly converted into flats. The house is in pebbledashed brick with stone dressings and a hipped slate roof. The original block has an L-shaped plan, is in two storeys with a single storey to the left, and has three bays. The front contains a Doric porch, and windows with architraves. Some windows in the ground floor are French windows, the others have friezes and cornices, and the upper floor has sash windows.
Brewhouse, Poulton Hall; 53.32741°N 2.99947°W	—	17th century	The former brewhouse is in brick on a stone base with stone dressings and a slate roof. It has two storeys and three bays. On the front are two entrances and two louvred windows. On the left side is an external staircase leading to a first floor entrance, and on the roof is a square clock turret.
Vineyard Farmhouse; 53.33034°N 3.00193°W	—	17th century	The farmhouse was originally timber-framed and later encased in sandstone, brick and render. It was extended in the late 18th or early 19th century, and again later. The farmhouse is mainly in two storeys, and consists of two ranges at right angles to each other. The roofs are slated.
Barn, Vineyard Farm; 53.33037°N 3.00224°W	—	17th century (probable)	The barn has five bays, the first three bays being timber-framed on a stone base with brick infill, and the other two bays in stone. It contains a large barn entrance, two smaller entrances, pitch holes, a half-dormer, and an external staircase. Inside are three cruck trusses.
Lancelyn Farmhouse and barn 53.33038°N 3.00304°W	—	Late 18th century	The farmhouse and barn are in brick with stone dressings and slate roofs. The farmhouse has two storeys and four bays, the right two bays being lower. To the right is a three-bay barn. The windows in the house are sashes with wedge lintels, and in the third bay is a cart entrance. The barn has a central entrance and ventilation holes in a diamond pattern.
Former dower house of Poulton Hall; 53.33347°N 3.00074°W		1843	Built as a dower house and later used as a church hall, it is pebbledashed with stone dressings and has a slate roof. The house is in two storeys and has crow-stepped gables. The main front is in five bays, the right bay projecting forward, and there are three bays on the right side. The windows are mullioned with sashes and have architraves.
