= Miranda of the Balcony =

1899 novel by A.E.W. Mason

- First edition
- Author: A.E.W. Mason
- Language: English
- Publisher: Macmillan
- Publication date: 1899
- Publication place: England, Gibraltar, Spain, Morocco
- Media type: Print
- Pages: 312

Miranda of the Balcony is a novel by the British writer A.E.W. Mason, first published 6 October 1899. It has been called a modern re-telling of Homer's Odyssey and was one of the sources used by James Joyce for his 1922 novel Ulysses.

== Plot ==
Ralph Warriner, a captain in the Royal Artillery, is stationed in the British garrison at Gibraltar, where he lives with his young wife Miranda whom he had married when she was 18. He is an unscrupulous, bullying man with little interest in her. After being dismissed from the service, Warriner flees Gibraltar in his yacht, and disappears. Two years later the yacht is found wrecked in a storm off the Scilly Isles. A body is identified as Warriner's from the papers it carries, and Miranda is informed of her husband's demise. Her friends expect her to return to England, but she prefers to remain in seclusion in the Andalusian town of Ronda, a hundred miles north of Gibraltar.

Luke Charnock, a young railway engineer, is introduced to Miranda, still aged only 24, at a dinner at her cousin's home in London two years later, and both remember having briefly seen each other once before. The night before the dinner Charnock had seen a vision of Miranda's silently-pleading face in his dressing table mirror. They go out on the balcony to talk, and although Miranda will not admit it Charnock is convinced that she is in need of help. When he accidentally tears her glove he suggests that it could serve as a token: should she need assistance she can summon him by sending it.

Miranda is blackmailed by 'Major' Ambrose Wilbraham, who knows not only that Ralph Warriner had been dismissed for selling British secrets to a foreign power, but also that his death was faked and that he is still alive and engaged in illegal gun-running into Morocco.

In Tangier, Ralph Warriner is kidnapped by a blind moor named Hassan Akbar whom he had earlier betrayed, and is sold into slavery in the Moroccan interior. His friend, the wealthy Belgian Claude Fournier – who is Warriner's gun-running business partner – asks Miranda to arrange a rescue bid. Reluctantly she agrees, more because Warriner was the father of her young son Rupert, who had died in infancy and is buried at Gibraltar, than for Warriner's own sake. She sends Charnock a torn glove.

After searching Morocco for two years, Charnock finds the enslaved Warriner and rescues him. As they travel back, Warriner becomes jealous of Charnock and convinces himself that he still loves his wife. But Warriner and Miranda meet only briefly before Warriner (still needing to lie low to avoid being arrested for his crimes) leaves for good. Charnock threatens Wilbraham with a visit from the police if he does not leave Miranda alone.

Warriner is killed in a boating accident, but Charnock does not hear the news for a year afterwards. Invited again to dinner in London, he once more finds Miranda upon the balcony.

== Critical reception ==
In a short 1903 review of three of Mason's early novels, Miranda of the Balcony, The Courtship of Morrice Buckler and The Philanderers, James Joyce noted similarities in the storylines: "the early, effaceable husband", the "previously-implicated girl of wayward habits" and "the sturdy, slow-witted Englishman". He found it "curious to watch this story reproducing itself without the author's assent, one imagines, through scenes and times differing so widely". The review concluded "The writing is often quite pretty, too. Isn't 'Miranda of the Balcony' a pretty name?"

Writing in 1952, Mason's biographer Roger Lancelyn Green thought it a most readable story, excellently written and well put-together, but rather like a very pleasant dream that one really can't remember in the morning. He noted that the first reviewers had had to confess "there is little to be said about it".

Jonathan R. Quick of the University of Massachusetts, however, had much more to say by 1985. In a paper in James Joyce Quarterly, Quick interpreted Joyce's concluding rhetorical question as a "sneering interrogative", but considered that Joyce had actually taken Mason far more seriously than his remarks might have suggested. Miranda of the Balcony, he argued, is of particular interest as a modern rewriting of The Odyssey in a manner prefiguring Joyce's own Ulysses. He noted that Mason "broadly hints" at his purpose to make sure that readers would not miss the allusions, and that he gives his characters multiple Homeric roles in the manner of the later Ulysses. Also, both Mason and Joyce depart from Homer in a similar way – the invention of a dead son – with Rupert (Mason) suggesting Randolph (Joyce). Finally, he noted that Miranda appears to be the only literary work known to Joyce that was set in Victorian Gibraltar, and from which he derived some of the scenes of Molly Bloom's recollections in Ulysses.

== Theatre adaptation ==
In 1901 the novel was dramatized by Anne Crawford Flexner. The play had reasonable success in New York.

== Film adaptation ==
In 1924 the story was turned into a silent film Slaves of Destiny directed by Maurice Elvey.

== Bibliography ==
- Green, Roger Lancelyn (1952). A. E. W. Mason. London: Max Parrish.
- Quick, Jonathan R. (1985). "The Homeric "Ulysses" and A.E.W. Mason's "Miranda of the Balcony"". James Joyce Quarterly. 23 (1): 31–43. JSTOR 25476698.
