= The Witness for the Defence =

1913 novel by A. E. W. Mason

- First edition
- Author: A. E. W. Mason
- Language: English
- Publisher: Hodder & Stoughton
- Publication date: 1913
- Publication place: England, Italy
- Media type: Print
- Pages: 312

The Witness for the Defence is a 1913 mystery and adventure novel by the English novelist A. E. W. Mason, published by Hodder & Stoughton. Considered one of Mason's best, it was adapted by the author from his 1911 stage play of the same name. In 1919 it was made into an American silent film The Witness for the Defense directed by George Fitzmaurice.

== Plot ==
Henry Thresk's difficult early relationship with his parents created in him a fierce determination to make his own way in the world. By the age of 28 he had become sufficiently well-established as a promising young barrister to take a month's holiday in Sussex, where he meets and becomes friendly with 19 year old Stella Derrick. On the last day of Henry's holiday, while out riding on the South Downs, Stella hints at her feelings for him. Although Thresk has similar feelings, he convinces himself that he has to focus on his career and that an early marriage would close off all avenues of advancement. Stella is mortified, and without resolving the issue the two part.

Eight years later, Thresk has become a prominent KC with a busy practice. Visiting a client at her home in Bombay, Thresk notices on the piano a framed photograph which he realises is of Stella. Enquiring about it, he learns that she had moved to India almost eight years earlier, and had very quickly married the Resident of Chitipur, Captain Ballantyne. Friends hint that the marriage is unhappy, and Thresk resolves to travel to Chitipur and – if he finds Stella willing to leave her husband – to take her away.

Thesk arrives while the Resident is away from home at his annual camp, and he is received in a large marquee. Ballantyne is friendly but Stella, believing his visit to be purely for sentimental reasons, acts coldly. During the course of the evening Ballantyne drinks heavily, and it is soon clear that he is violent and abusive towards his wife. Apparently in terror of local gangsters, he fears the shadowy corners of the marquee, and at one point breaks off in horror when he sees, or thinks he sees, a thin brown arm creeping under the edge of the tent. Thresk sees nothing there. He has no time to talk to Stella in private or to explain his visit. As he hurriedly departs to catch the train back to Bombay he catches sight of her standing alone, calmly cleaning her husband's rook-rifle.

A few days later Thresk resolves to write to Stella to ask if she will join him, but before he can send the letter news arrives that the Resident has been found dead outside his tent, shot with his own rifle. In the absence of any other suspect Stella is charged with murder, and Thresk follows the trial closely in the newspapers. When it becomes clear that Stella has no real defence and is likely to be convicted, Thresk comes forward and gives perjured eye-witness evidence of an arm reaching beneath the tent. The presence of an unknown potential assailant is enough to cast doubt on the prosecution's case and Stella is acquitted.

Stella returns to her home village of Little Beeding in Sussex, but is ostracised by most of the local gentry, who doubt her innocence. When a local army captain, Dick Hazlewood, falls in love with her, his suspicious father enlists the help of a solicitor friend to establish her guilt. He concocts a ruse to persuade Thresk to visit, with a view to confronting him unannounced with Stella and questioning him closely about the evidence he had given in court. Thresk deals with the informal cross examination well enough to convince the solicitor of his veracity, but he privately insists to Stella that she must be absolutely honest with her lover and admit her guilt. Thresk believes that she has agreed to marry Dick only to acquire respectability, and when at last she understands that his purpose in visiting the camp was to invite her to leave her husband she exclaims "If only I had known ... What a difference that would have made!" He again invites her to join him. But now it is too late: Stella explains that she really does love Dick, and that they had privately married in London a few days earlier. When she confesses all to her husband, he replies that he had known the truth all along.

== Background and stage play ==
The Witness for the Defence started life as a stage play which Mason had privately published in 1911. During the play's run, Mason made amendments and improvements which were incorporated into the acting edition published by Samuel French in 1913, and which also found their way into the novel published in the same year. The novel uses nearly all the speeches from the play, in some cases with yet further improvements. Mason's biographer, Roger Lancellyn Green, commented that Mason was able to reproduce his characters with more precision and greater focus, having seen them upon the stage.

== Literary significance and criticism ==
Writing in 1952, Green considered The Witness for the Defence to be one of the best tales of mystery and adventure that Mason ever wrote.

== Bibliography ==
- Green, Roger Lancelyn (1952). A. E. W. Mason. London: Max Parrish.
- Kabatchnik, Amnon. Blood on the Stage, 1925-1950: Milestone Plays of Crime, Mystery, and Detection : an Annotated Repertoire. Scarecrow Press, 2010.
