= The Sapphire =

1933 novel by A. E. W. Mason

- First edition
- Author: A. E. W. Mason
- Language: English
- Publisher: Hodder & Stoughton
- Publication date: 1933
- Publication place: England and Burma
- Media type: Print
- Pages: 320

The Sapphire is a 1933 novel of mystery and adventure by A. E. W. Mason, published by Hodder & Stoughton.

== Plot ==
The novel is narrated by Martin Legatt, a young man at the start of his career with the Forest Corporation, an international logging concern. Travelling by steamer down the Irrawaddy River in Burma he makes the acquaintance of the captain, Michael Crowther, who has been in Burma for many years. Crowther shows Legatt a small bag of trinkets that he has been given for safekeeping by his local Burmese 'wife', and tells him that he will never see her or their daughter again as he has decided to leave Burma and make a name for himself in London. Unexpectedly, the bag contains a valuable sapphire.

Leggat's career takes him back to England where he hears nothing of Crowther, although he does spot him once in a London church. Three years after his first visit, Legatt returns to Burma to find that Crowther has also returned and has in the meantime become a trainee Buddhist monk. He has given his possessions to a monastery, and the sapphire and trinkets now adorn the spire of the monastery's pagoda. One night the sapphire is stolen by two thieves, and Crowther is given permission to try to recover it.

In Ceylon, Legatt bumps into a friend of his from London, Imogen Cloud, who has just purchased that very sapphire, now mounted as a pendant, from a local dealer. Having sold on the stone once, the thieves decide to repeat the exercise, and when Imogen visits the local beauty spot of Adam's Peak she is attacked and avoids being thrown off the mountainside only by Leggat's quick reactions. Imogen travels on to Anuradhapura where a snake charmer hypnotizes her and escapes with the sapphire, Legatt arriving just a little too late. Imogen and Legatt fall in love.

Crowther catches up with the thieves at Colombo, and discovers that they had sold the sapphire on again to another dealer, from whom it has been bought by a Robin Colhoun for his companion Jill Leslie. But once more the trail goes cold.

Back in London, Cowther visits Legatt and asks for an entré to a private gambling salon in Savile Row. Robin Colhoun and Jill Leslie are there, and Colhoun is exposed as a cheat by Inspector Hanaud who has attended incognito at the request of one of the other guests. The party breaks up, and Colhoun keeps a low profile in the following weeks.

One evening, Imogen and Legatt see the up-and-coming young singer Letty Ransome across a restaurant. With her is Jill Leslie, wearing the sapphire pendant. Imogen decides to try to recover the jewel for Crowther, and suggests that Crowther should get to know Jill and her circle. Jill refuses to sell the pendant, and Imogen advises Crowther to rely on her generosity and to ask for it as a gift once she fully understands his religious motivation for wanting it. But it is clear that Letty Ransome is also interested.

Legatt and Imogen marry. On their return from honeymoon they attend a masked ball at the Royal Albert Hall during which Crowther at last asks Jill for the sapphire. Unable to hear his request properly due to the noise, she asks him to visit her in her hotel flat the next afternoon. At lunch beforehand in the hotel's dining room, Legatt, Crowther and Imogen bump into Letty. She explains that she left her handbag in Jill's flat after the ball, and pops upstairs to get it. She returns ten minutes later, breathing heavily and with patchy skin, and beseeches the party never to mention the incident. When Crowther and Legatt go up to the flat about an hour and a half later they find a policeman outside her door, and discover that she has just been found dead. The doctor confirms she died of a cocaine overdose. Realising that the sapphire is missing, Imogen confronts Letty who confesses that she had seen Jill near death when she went in, and had taken her opportunity to pick up the jewel. Imogen persuades her to hand it over. She passes it to Crowther who takes a passage back to Burma to restore it to the pagoda.

== Background ==
The novel incorporates Mason's memories of his elder brother, Charles, who had left home under a cloud and became a pilot on the Hooghly River in India, where he formed an attachment with a local girl.

Mason himself took a trip to Burma in 1927 which made a great impression and which he used repeatedly in his writings, especially his memories of the Irrawaddy. He also visited Ceylon and saw the tourist sights of Rock Temple and Adam's Peak.

A shorter version of the story originally appeared in Pall Mall Magazine for May 1927.

== Literary significance and criticism ==
Mason's biographer Roger Lancelyn Green, writing in 1952, considered The Sapphire to be "not out of Mason's top drawer, but a very pleasant memory". He felt that after a slow and rather episodic start, the novel held the reader's interest until the end, demonstrating Mason's "unflagging skill in the realm of adventure stories".

== Bibliography ==
- Green, Roger Lancelyn (1952). A. E. W. Mason. London: Max Parrish.
