= The Dean's Elbow =

1930 novel by A. E. W. Mason

- First edition
- Author: A. E. W. Mason
- Language: English
- Publisher: Hodder & Stoughton
- Publication date: 1930
- Publication place: England
- Media type: Print
- Pages: 312

The Dean's Elbow is a 1930 novel by the English novelist A. E. W. Mason, first serialised in Harper's Bazaar from October 1929.

== Plot ==
In 1895, Mark Thewliss invites Mona Lightfoot to join him for a month's holiday, exploring the seas of South West England in his yacht Sea Flower. He is an amibitious 31 year old chemist with a well-known dyeing firm; she is a 23 year old clerk to Henry Perriton, a small-time accountant. Although Mona hopes for marriage, she knows that is not on offer and that he is "asking for the supreme sacrifice in return for just four weeks of romantic adventure." And indeed, when Mark receives an offer of a partnership in the firm, he cuts the holiday short. Back in London, he puts Mona out of his mind.

Thewliss prospers, and at the age of 44 is elected to parliament. Invited to a house party by Colonel Westram he meets Westram's niece Lady Olivia Stanton, his nephew the young army officer Derek Crayle, and his daughter Angela. Thewliss is entranced by the house and the company and yearns for a life he has never known: a country house filled with young people and – most especially – a daughter of his own. But the generosity of his new friends fills him with remorse about his treatment of Mona years earlier, and he instructs an inquiry agent to make sure she is not in need. The agent reports that Mona had married Henry Perriton and that the family, while not well-off, seem happy enough. Thewliss buys the estate neighbouring Westram's, and he and Olivia Stanton are married.

Unfortunately, the agent is wrong. In fact, only a few weeks after the holiday Mona found she was pregnant and had married her employer in desperation. They had agreed that Mona's daughter Lois would be brought up as his, and that she would not be told about her real father. As the years pass Lois comes to detest the alcoholic Henry, and at the age of 16 she resolves to earn her own living with a view to rescuing her mother. Henry blurts out her true parentage, and tells her the family is being spied on to ensure they make no trouble for Thewliss and his new wife. Lois resolves to take revenge on her true father.

After the war, Thewliss is raised to the peerage. Lois, meanwhile, finds herself having to work for starvation wages. Mona feels she has no option but to visit Lord Thewliss and plead on Lois's behalf for his help. Thewliss offers to take on Lois as his private secretary, and is astounded to discover that he has a daughter. Lois does well in her new role and becomes close to Derek Crayle, who has now been taken into the firm. Although father and daughter both know of their relationship, each believes the other to be ignorant of it.

Thewliss designs a revolutionary colour-fast chemical process suitable for all types of dye and all types of cloth, shocking competing manufacturers who know that this will put their own businesses at risk. The secret written plans for the process are stolen, and Lois is discovered red-handed trying to copy out the material in order to sell it on.

Father and daughter confront each other. Each learns for the first time that the other had known of their relationship, and of other misunderstandings. Lois vents her anger against the man who abandoned her mother and thought her capable of blackmail. Thewliss explains that he was simply trying to make sure they were not in need, and that he always believed the family to be happy. Crayle offers to stick by Lois, but she turns him down and leaves.

Mona and Lois set up a small secretarial office in Southampton. Crayle returns to his old army life, and two years later is killed in India. Mourning his loss, Thewliss takes a holiday alone in the Sea Flower. While sailing for one last time in the seas in which he had holidayed with Mona so many years before, he himself dies. A solicitor hands Mona a letter from Thewliss saying that he has made provision for them in his will and quoting a line from Shakespeare, "Hereafter, in a better world than this, I shall desire more love and knowledge of you."

== Title ==
The Dean's Elbow is the name of a shipping buoy in Southampton Water. During their sailing holiday Thewliss and Mona give it a wide berth, an act that Mason uses as a metaphor for avoiding marriage. As Mona says, "We have kept clear of the Dean's Elbow, and the Bishop too, my dear".

== Dedication ==
Mason dedicated the novel "To the memory of Muriel Stephens June 27, 1902 – October 30, 1929". An epigram reads "Longa est vita si plena est" [Life is long if it is full].

== Background ==
Like Mark Thewliss, Mason was himself a member of parliament for a short period, and the harrowing experience of his maiden speech to the House on 15 November 1906 forms the basis for part of the narrative. The event had also been recounted in The Turnstile (1912). The Sea Flower was Mason's own yacht of the same name.

The Muriel Stephens of the dedication was Mason's secretary, the sister of Captain W. D. Stephens whom the author had met when visiting Burma and Ceylon in 1925. Muriel was then aged 23, and her youthful presence made Mason – who was already over 60 – yearn for the child he had never had, and for the country house he had always dreamed of; but these remained out of reach. Muriel died of tuberculosis in 1929, aged 27.

The ideas for the book had been developed by Mason for more than ten years, and first took shape in an unperformed play called The Mallet. The original plot was similar except that, at the end, Celia (renamed Lois in the novel) returns, and a wedding with Derek is suggested. Unfortunately, theatre managers did not like the play, and Mason re-wrote it as a novel during the period that Muriel lay in hospital. Mason's biographer, Roger Lancelyn Green, suggested that the change to the "ruthlessly pessimistic" ending was the result of the author having written the final chapter at the very time that Muriel lay dying.

== Literary significance and criticism ==
The novel was well-received on its publication in July 1930, and Mason was pleased at a mention of his private agent in a Times leader. E. V. Lucas, though, wrote privately that while he admired the novel's style and treatment, he could not believe that Lois would not have told Thewliss of her condition. He suggested that the theft could have been dispensed with and that Lois and Derek should have been married.

== Bibliography ==
- Green, Roger Lancelyn (1952). A. E. W. Mason. London: Max Parrish.

== See also ==
Text of The Dean's Elbow at Gutenberg Australia
