= The Summons (Mason novel) =

1920 novel by A. E. W. Mason

- First edition
- Author: A. E. W. Mason
- Language: English
- Publisher: Hodder & Stoughton
- Publication date: October 1920
- Media type: Print
- Pages: 320

The Summons is a 1920 novel of adventure and romance by A. E. W. Mason, published by Hodder & Stoughton. Set just before and during the Great War, the novel recounts the adventures of Martin Hillyard, a secret service agent, and his army officer friend Harry Luttrell who aims to restore the battered reputation of his regiment.

Hillyard has been called the nearest approach to a self-portrait that Mason ever drew, and his childhood and secret service wartime experiences are based on those of the author himself.

== Plot ==
After a good early education, Martin Hillyard leaves home at 16 to scrape a living in the ports of the Southern Spanish coast. When he reaches the age of 19, his parents die and he takes up a place at Oxford, becoming friends with Harry Luttrell, a young man steeped in tradition. After University, Hillyard works as a playwright while Luttrell feels it his duty to take a commission in his family's regiment, the Clayfords, to redeem its reputation after its disgrace in the South African Wars.

Fearful of becoming an "undisciplined soldier", and now wanting to escape from a relationship with Stella Croyle, a divorcée he finds excessively proprietorial, Luttrell volunteers in 1912 to be posted to the Sudan. Stella, however, will not accept that the relationship is over, and when Hillyard decides to take a shooting holiday there, gets him to promise that he will ask Luttrell to write. When the friends meet, Luttrell makes it clear that he has no intention of doing so.

Hillyard is summoned to the Admiralty in London, and learns that his wide network of working class Spanish contacts makes him well suited for secret service work.

In August 1914 Hillyard attends a house party at the home of Sir Chichester and Lady Splay. Most of the house guests attend the racing at Goodwood, but Lady Splay's orphaned niece, the 18 year old Joan Whitworth, affects to reject conventional society and declines to go. The guests notice as the afternoon draws on that gaps have appeared in the crowds and that "the officers had gone". Great Britain has entered the Great War.

Largely due to the bravery of Luttrell, the Clayfords redeem their reputation at the Battle of the Somme in July 1916. With assistance from an influential Spanish tobacco smuggler, José Medina, Hillyard obtains details of German submarine movements and discovers how enemy messages are being passed between Berlin and Madrid. Medina confirms the involvement of a prominent Spaniard called Mario Escobar.

Returning to England after twenty months abroad, Hillyard is again invited to Lady Splay's, along with Luttrell. Joan, who in the interim has been in a public relationship with Escobar, instantly falls in love with Luttrell and he with her. There is a difficult scene when Luttrell discovers that a disturbed Stella Croyle is also a guest, and that she is still expecting him to return to her. Joan writes to Escobar to call their relationship off, and they meet alone in the house late at night. He threatens her, but leaves precipitately when he realises that their meeting has been overheard by Stella.

At breakfast the next morning, the party are astonished by a London newspaper report of an incident said to have taken place in the house the night before: the tragic death by chloroform of Mrs Stella Croyle. Stella's maid, Jenny, is sent to check her room, and finds that Stella has indeed died. Hillyard learns that during the night – but well before the death actually occurred – a chauffeur had arrived at the newspaper's offices bearing a letter under the signature of Sir Chichester, but (unknown to the editor) in Stella's handwriting. Questioned about it, Jenny tries to implicate Joan, but at last confesses that the bearer was Stella's own chauffeur, Jenny's fiancé. She had not known what the letter contained. On discovering her mistress's suicide in the morning, she had tried to ensure that Joan, whom she hated as her mistress's rival, would have to attend the inquest and give public evidence of her secret meeting with Escobar. Such a disclosure would destroy her reputation and prevent her marriage to Luttrell.

Escobar is arrested and interned as a spy, and Jenny belatedly realises that she may herself be suspected of murder. Joan avoids having to give evidence, and the coroner brings in a verdict of suicide.

Joan and Luttrell marry before he is recalled to France ten days later. He loses his life at the Battle of Messines in 1917, and Joan bears his child six months afterwards. She tells Hillyard of her pride in her young son, rejoicing that there will be no stigma on the Clayfords when he gets his commission.

== Principal characters ==
- Harry Luttrell: traditionally-minded army officer
- Joan Whitworth: orphaned niece of Lady Splay, initially unconventional
- Martin Hillyard: university friend of Luttrell, playwright, employed on secret service work
- Mrs Stella Croyle: divorcée with a troubled background, briefly in a relationship with Luttrell
- Jenny: Stella Croyle's maid
- José Medina: influential Spanish tobacco smuggler
- Mario Escobar: prominent Spaniard, covertly working to help the Germans
- Sir Chichester Splay: baronet
- Millicent, Lady Splay: wife of Sir Chichester

== Title ==
Several of the characters receive a literal summons of some sort within the novel, but according to a contemporary reviewer the title, "as may readily be imagined, is the call of the nation and Empire to war in August, 1914".

== Background ==
The Summons has been called Mason's most accurate and complete account of his own youth, with the fictional Hillyard the nearest approach to a self-portrait that Mason ever drew. Hillyard's school in the novel (which he hated) is based on Mason's own Dulwich, and his expedition to the Sudan mirrors that of the author himself in 1912.

Mason's secret service work during the war provides the basis for Hillyard's activities, including ostensibly holidaying in the Mediterranean on a steam yacht, and calling in – apparently innocently – at various ports of interest in Southern Spain and the Balearics.

The tragic story of Stella Croyle which makes up the last third of the novel uses ideas initially intended for a play called In Shining Armour. This was never performed, having been abandoned due to the intervention of the war.

== Literary significance and criticism ==
Contemporary reviewers were generally positive, though there were some criticisms.

The Graphic noted the similarity between the exploits of the fictional Hillyard and Mason's own war service, in Spain and elsewhere, as well as that between Hillyard's Admiralty contact and the real head of Naval Intelligence at the time, Admiral Hall. The Aberdeen Daily Journal considered that the author had used the fruit of his experiences in the war as a secret service man to "capital effect" in this novel, praising him for "his old mastery of a complicated plot, in which mystery, romance, and picturesque settings compete with a merry wit for predominance in a story of colourful interest". The Scotsman was likewise generally enthusiastic, though noting that in places "the interest seems to be wanting in consideration". The Sunday Times gave a mixed review, calling the book a "very readable spy story", written "pleasantly and easily" but marred by a lack of definiteness; according to the reviewer, the author should "build a little more carefully" to avoid entirely the charge of pot-boiling."

Mason's biographer Roger Lancelyn Green, writing in 1952, considered The Summons a first class novel, though flawed due to the welding together of two disparate plot threads: the secret service exploits of Martin Hillyard, and the tragedy of Stella Croyle. Taken individually, he praised both: the first as "very exciting ... with all the stamp of truth" and the second as "one of the most brilliant combinations of thrilling plot and psychological study that Mason ever wrote."

== Bibliography ==
- Green, Roger Lancelyn (1952). A. E. W. Mason. London: Max Parrish.
