= Running Water (novel) =

1907 novel by A.E.W. Mason

- Cover of 1910 Hodder and Stoughton edition
- Author: A.E.W. Mason
- Language: English
- Genre: Adventure
- Publisher: Bernhard Tauchnitz
- Publication date: 1907
- Publication place: United Kingdom
- Media type: Print
- Pages: 303

Running Water is a 1907 adventure novel by the British writer A.E.W. Mason. The story could be defined as mountaineering crime fiction with a romantic twist.

== Plot ==
The protagonists are the young Sylvia Thesiger and Hilary Chayne, a captain in the British army. After their first meeting on the Mont Blanc massif, Sylvia goes back to England to live with her father (whom she has never met). Skinner proves to be a dangerous man with a mysterious past and Sylvia tries, with Chayne's help, to protect the designated victim. The final showdown takes place on the fatal Brenva route, one of the most dangerous ways to reach the top of Mont Blanc.

== Film adaptation ==
In 1922 it was adapted into a film Running Water directed by Maurice Elvey.

== Bibliography ==
- Goble, Alan. The Complete Index to Literary Sources in Film. Walter de Gruyter, 1999.
- Green, Roger Lancelyn (1952). A. E. W. Mason. London: Max Parrish.
