= Poulton Hall =

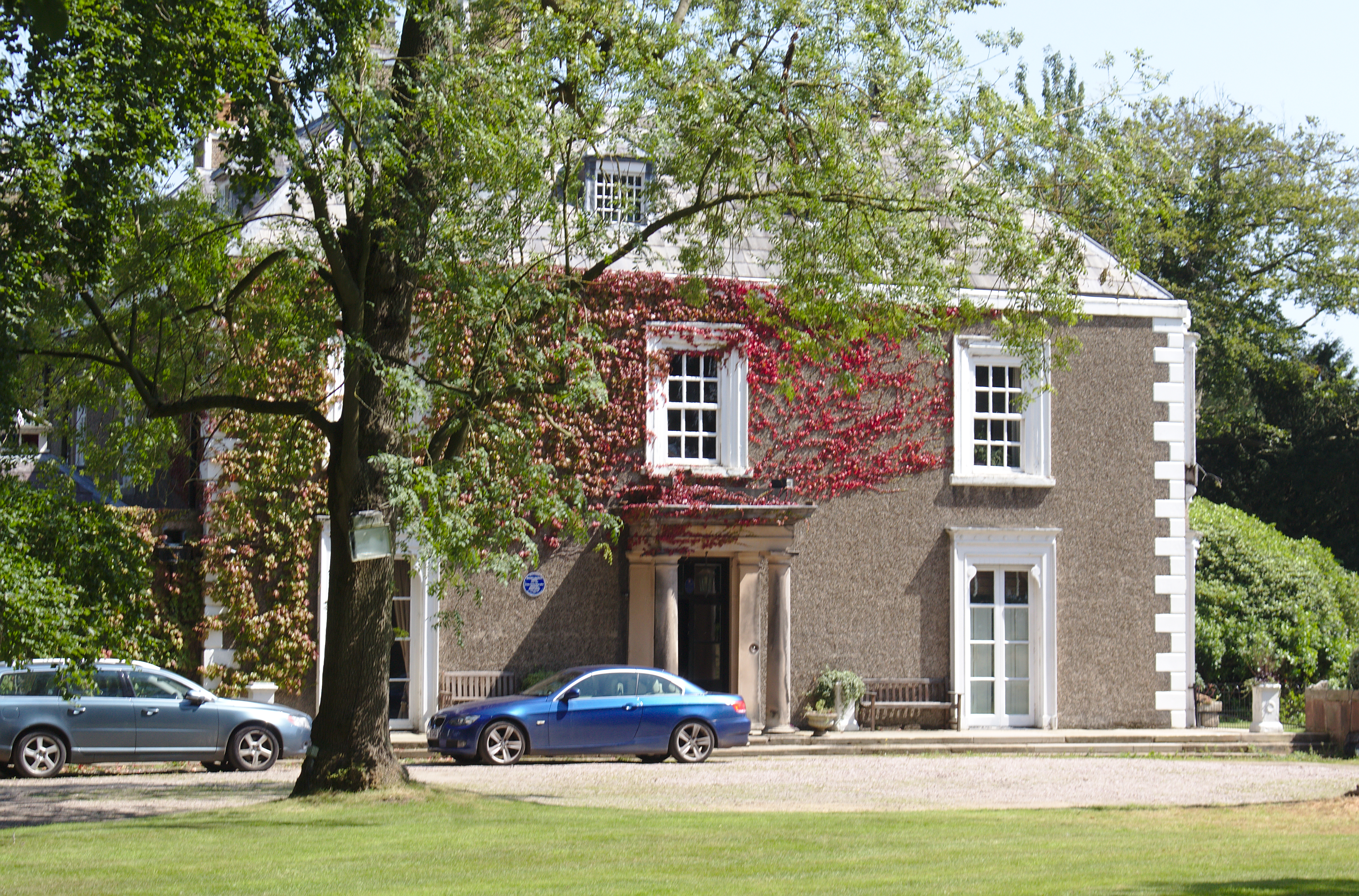

- Location in Merseyside
- 53.3271°N 2.9998°W
- Location: Poulton Road,Wirral CH63 9LN
- OS grid reference: SJ 335 816

History
- Built: 1653

Listed Building – Grade II
- Designated: 27 December 1962

Poulton Hall is a Grade II listed country house in Spital on the Wirral Peninsula, within the Metropolitan Borough of Wirral, Merseyside, England. The present hall was built in 1653 and extended in the following centuries. It is built in pebbledashed brick with stone dressings and slate roof. Its contents include a three-manual pipe organ. In the grounds is a 17th-century former brewhouse that has a clock tower with a 32-bell carillon. The house and the brewhouse are both recorded in the National Heritage List for England as designated Grade II listed buildings. Musical concerts are held in the house, and the gardens, which contain 20th-century sculptures, are open to the public twice a year.

== History ==
Poulton Hall has been the home of the Poulton Lancelyn family since the 12th century. In the 16th century their surname became Lancelyn Green (or Greene) when Elizabeth Lancelyn married Randle Greene of Congleton. It has been alleged that a castle existed on the site, but there is now no reliable evidence of earthworks or a castle. The present hall dates from 1653, and it was extended to the rear in 1720 when Revd Robert Green added a library. In 1840 a larger addition was made, consisting of a dining room and service wing, and a billiard room containing a pipe organ was built to the left of this in the 1880s.

== Architecture ==
=== Exterior ===
The house is constructed in pebbledashed brick with decorative quoins and slate tile roof. The original central block has two storeys and three bays to the front elevation. To the ground floor, the primary entrance door occupies the central bay and is surmounted by a Classical portico with twin monolithic stone Tuscan columns. A symmetrical fenestration pattern is achieved through two flanking bays, occupied by glazed French doors (Note: In the Buildings of England series, the porch is described as being Doric.) with surrounding moulded architraves, projecting friezes and cornices which bring a deep sculptural relief to the façade. To the upper floor, each bay is occupied by sash windows with glazing bars. A single-storey wing projects from the left terminal of the main block, incorporating a hipped roof and a clerestory. The structural transition to a bowed elevation on the right terminal bay breaks the rectilinear plan of the house, whilst creating a panoptic interior view which draws the landscape into the room. The rear of the house is aesthetically similar to the front façade, yet slightly simpler.

=== Interior ===
Inside the house is a 17th-century staircase with twisted balusters, flat-topped newels, and added Gothic features. The library has three recesses on each side that are lined with books. The dining room contains a screen of Ionic columns. The present organ has two manuals, It was built in about 1902 by J. J. Binns and rebuilt in Clay Cross Methodist Church in 1922 by Blackett and Howden. In 1940 a new stop was added by Willis, and in 1971 the organ was moved to Newbold Church, Chesterfield. In about 1983 further additions were made, again by Willis. The organ was moved into Poulton Hall in 1993 by S .R. L. Green when further additions were made.

== Outbuildings ==
The most notable structure in the grounds is a former brewhouse that stands to the northeast of the hall, This dates from the 17th century and is constructed in brick on a stone base, with stone dressings and a slate roof. The building has two storeys and three bays, and the windows and entrances have flat arches with stone keystones. There are entrances in the first and second bays, and in the upper storey there are louvred windows in the first and third bays. On the left side of the building is an external staircase leading to a first floor entrance. On the roof is a square clock turret with louvred sides. The turret contains a carillon of 32 bells that are computer controlled. Of these, 23 were cast by the Royal Dutch Bellfoundry in 2007–09, and the other are second-hand, and were tuned by John Taylor of Loughborough. Behind the brewhouse is a four-bay shippon. This has two turrets, one of which contains a clock, and the other a bell. The bell was formerly in Lindisfarne College.

== Gardens ==
At the entrance to the gardens is a monument erected by Scirard de Lancelyn in the 11th century. The path then leads across a ha-ha to lawns and the Walled Garden. The Walled Garden was laid out in the 1980s by June Lancelyn Green and contains contemporary sculptures. Some of these reflect the literary interests of her late husband, Roger Lancelyn Green; these include Lewis Carroll, C. S. Lewis, Peter Pan, and Sherlock Holmes. Included in the garden are sculptures by Jim Heath, Sue Sharples, Judith Railton, John and Carol White, Cilla West (daughter of Roger Lancelyn Green), and Sean Rice.

== Appraisal ==
The hall and the brewhouse were both designated as Grade II listed buildings on 27 December 1962. Grade II is the lowest of the three grades of listing and is applied to buildings that are "nationally important and of special interest". Hartwell et al in the Buildings of England series describe the house as being "deeply historical but not at all grand".

== Present day ==
Tours of the house and outbuildings are arranged, as well as musical recitals and concerts, and the gardens are open to the public twice a year under the National Gardens Scheme. The barn can be hired for private functions, and the hall and its grounds are available for filming. They have been used as locations in the film Longford, and in the television series The Owl Service.

== See also ==
- Listed buildings in Poulton, Bebington
