= The Witness for the Defense =

1919 film by George Fitzmaurice

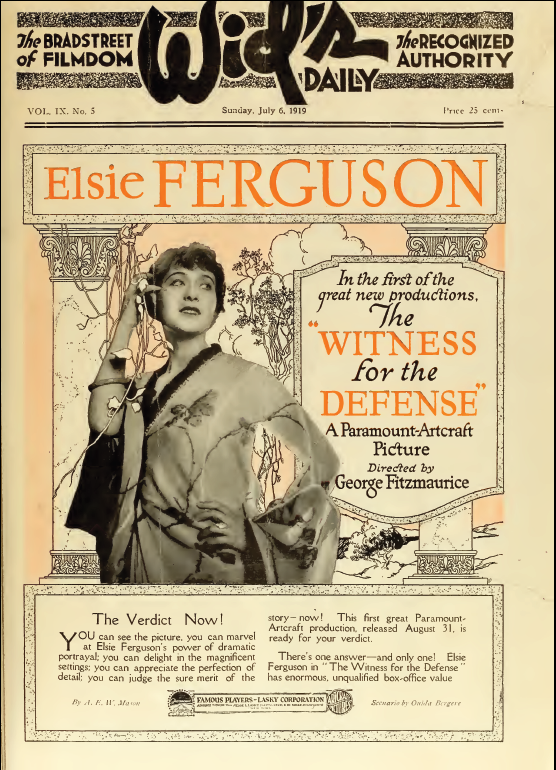
- Ad for the film on the cover of a 1919 issue of Wid's Daily
- Directed by: George Fitzmaurice; William J. Scully (asst. director)
- Written by: Ouida Bergère (scenario)
- Based on: The Witness for the Defence by A. E. W. Mason
- Produced by: Adolph Zukor
- Starring: Elsie Ferguson; Warner Oland; Wyndham Standing
- Cinematography: Arthur C. Miller and/or Hal Young
- Production company: Famous Players–Lasky
- Distributed by: Paramount Pictures
- Release date: September 14, 1919
- Running time: 50 minutes
- Language: Silent (English intertitles)

The Witness for the Defense is a 1919 American silent drama film directed by George Fitzmaurice and starring Elsie Ferguson, Warner Oland, and Wyndham Standing.

== Cast ==
- Elsie Ferguson as Stella Derrick
- Vernon Steele as Dick Hazelwood
- Warner Oland as Captain Ballantyne
- Wyndham Standing as Henry Thresk
- George Fitzgerald as Wigney Derrick
- J. H. Gilmour as Harold Hazelwood
- Amelia Summerville as Margaret Pettifer
- Cora Williams as Teresa Derrick
- Blanche Standing as Mary Derrick
- Leslie King as Baram Singh
- Charles W. Charles as Gardner
- Mrs. Bryant as Gardner's Wife
- Etienne Girardot as Richard Pettifer
- Henry Warwick as Lawyer

== Production background ==
The film is based on the 1913 novel The Witness for the Defence by A. E. W. Mason. Mason's story was performed as a play on Broadway in 1911 and starred Ethel Barrymore.

Location shooting for the film was carried out in Miami, Florida, though the location was doubling for India.

The film is the earliest of prolific director George Fitzmaurice's to survive and is likewise the one of few silent films of Elsie Ferguson that remain extant. The film is also the first feature-length film art direction credit for William Cameron Menzies.

== Preservation ==
A complete print of The Witness for the Defense is held by the Gosfilmofond in Moscow.
