= A Romance of Wastdale =

1921 British silent film

- Directed by: Maurice Elvey
- Based on: A Romance of Wastdale by A. E. W. Mason
- Starring: Milton Rosmer; Valya Venitskaya; Fred Raynham
- Production company: Stoll Pictures
- Distributed by: Stoll Pictures
- Release date: 1921
- Country: United Kingdom
- Language: Silent

A Romance of Wastdale is a 1921 British silent adventure film directed by Maurice Elvey and starring Milton Rosmer, Valya Venitskaya and Fred Raynham. It was based on the 1895 novel of the same name by A. E. W. Mason.

== Cast ==
- Milton Rosmer - David Gordon
- Valya Venitskaya - Kate Nugent
- Fred Raynham - Austin Hawke
- Irene Rooke - Mrs Jackson
