= The Turnstile =

1912 novel by A. E. W. Mason

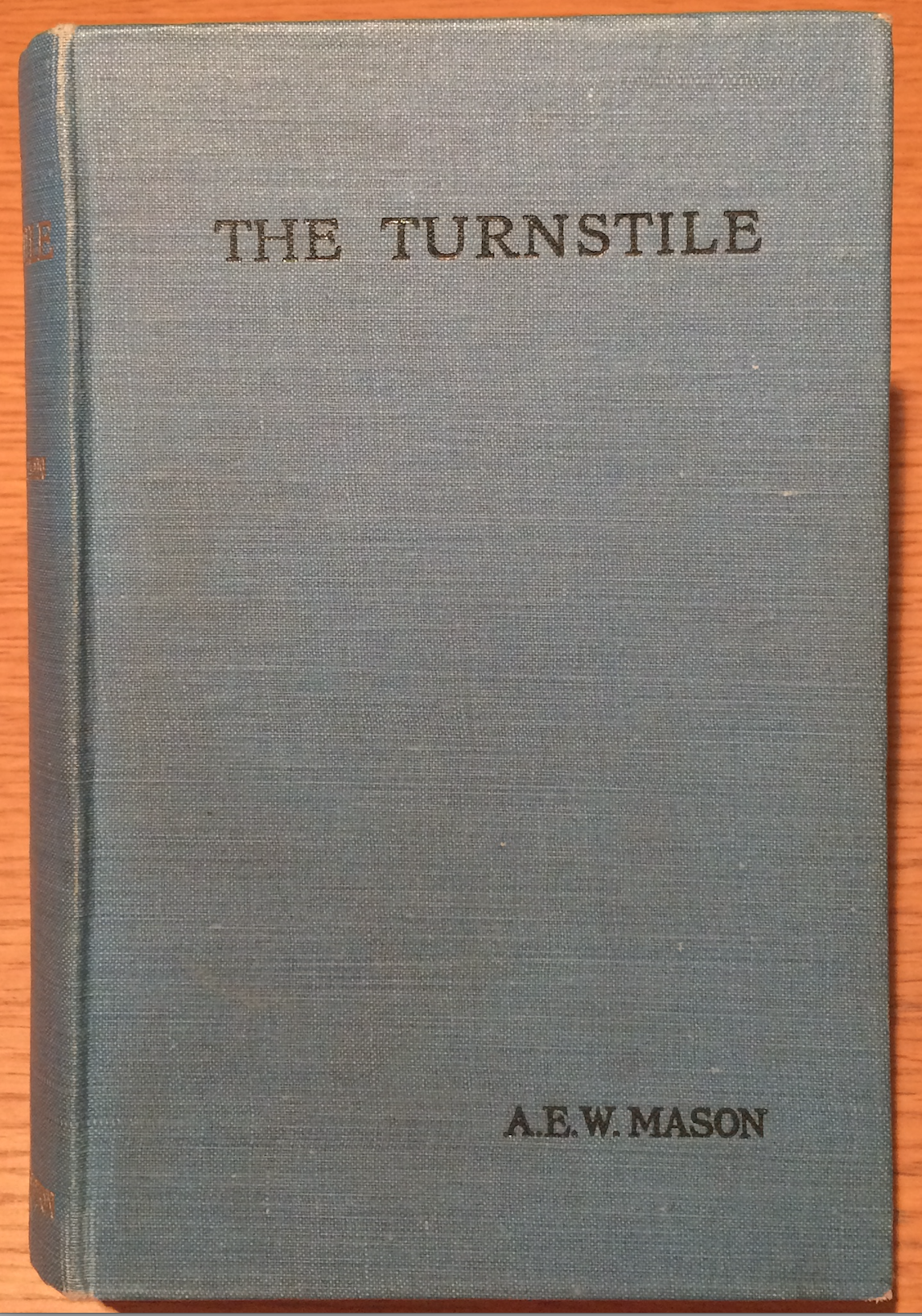
- Author: A. E. W. Mason
- Language: English
- Set in: England, Argentina
- Publisher: Hodder & Stoughton
- Publication date: 1912
- Publication place: UK
- Media type: Print
- Pages: 344

The Turnstile is a 1912 political novel by the English author A. E. W. Mason. The novel's fictional hero was based party upon the author's own experiences as a Member of parliament, and partly upon his friend Robert Falcon Scott, who at that time had yet to start out on his ill-fated expedition to the South Pole.

== Plot ==
Cynthia Daventry, the heroine of the story, grows up in Argentina as the adopted daughter of an English couple, Robert and Jane Daventry. Unable to have children themselves, they had adopted Cynthia at the age of three from a foundling hospital where she had been left by her dissolute father, James Glanville, following her mother's death. Cynthia is unaware of her parentage, and is horrified when on her 17th birthday Glanville arrives unannounced to claim her, intending to force her into prostitution in Buenos Aires and live off the proceeds. The Daventrys flee back to England, where they live comfortably, although Cynthia never shakes off her deep-rooted fears.

After the Daventrys’ death, Cynthia marries Captain Harry Rames, an up-and-coming politician whom she had first admired years earlier when as a naval officer he had led an expedition to the Antarctic. She realises that Rames does not love her but hopes that he will in time. Meanwhile, she throws herself into furthering his political career, while secretly regretting that his activities are driven not by any inner conviction but by his desire to win power and influence.

Some years later, in spite of Rames’ increasing success he quite suddenly loses interest in politics, though he hides the fact from Cynthia whom he has now started to love. For her part, Cynthia recognises a change and suspects that he might have taken a lover. When Rames eventually admits that his long-sublimated passion for the Antarctic has reasserted itself, Cynthia consents to his abandoning politics and leading a new expedition south. During the three years that Rames is away Cynthia goes back to live in her childhood home in Argentina. Ultimately, Rames returns safely to her.

== Background ==
Mason's fictional hero, Captain Rames, was based party upon his own experiences as a Liberal Member of parliament between 1906 and 1910, and partly upon his friend Robert Falcon Scott, who at that time had yet to start out on his ill-fated Terra Nova Expedition.

As a candidate for the Liberal cause, Mason had proved himself to be an excellent and rousing political speaker, with JM Barrie writing to Arthur Quiller-Couch that he "is loved all over the place and gets wound up by big meetings to great effect". Rames's election speech in the novel is taken directly from Mason's own experience of being elected as an MP on 16 January 1906, a supporter recalling "On the day of the poll I waited up late with a large crowd in the street to hear the result. When it was announced Mason appeared on a small balcony, and there was much cheering. He had almost lost his voice, but when there was silence he said 'My constituents -- ', and there was so much cheering that he did not have to say any more".

Mason found his duties as an MP challenging, and his harrowing experience of making his maiden speech in the House on 15 November 1906 is described both in this book and in The Dean's Elbow. The pettiness and lack of individuality of party politics galled him bitterly, and he allowed Rames express his disillusionment for him. Ultimately disappointed with political life, Mason abandoned politics for literature in 1910.

Mason had completed the novel by the end of 1911, aligning his hero with Robert Scott more closely by matching his voyage to the Antarctic with the voyage that Scott himself was about to undertake. Unfortunately, by the time of its publication in September 1912, Scott had already perished and the press had published news of Amundsen’s success at the South Pole. In an introductory note dated May 1912, Mason said "In view of recent events, I think it proper to say that this book was planned and the writing of it begun by the spring of the year 1909".

== Reception ==
On its publication in 1912, the book was greeted as one of the best parliamentary novels since Disraeli's, and at the same time "as absorbing and admirably written as any Mr Mason has done".

Writing in 1952, Mason’s biographer Roger Lancelyn Green called The Turnstile "one of Mason's most successful novels, a novel pure and simple without any of the adventurous content of his other books". Green noted that the reason for its not being one of Mason's most popular books lies in its unexpectedness, with readers of Mason expecting excitement and adventure rather than a novel of character.

== Bibliography ==
- Green, Roger Lancelyn (1952). A.E.W. Mason. London: Max Parrish & Co Limited.
