= A Romance of Wastdale (novel) =

1895 novel by A.E.W. Mason

- First edition
- Author: A.E.W. Mason
- Language: English
- Genre: Drama
- Set in: English Lake District
- Publisher: E. Mathews
- Publication date: 1895
- Publication place: United Kingdom
- Media type: Print
- Pages: 139

A Romance of Wastdale is the first novel of the English author A.E.W. Mason, published in 1895.

== Plot ==
After an absence of three years, David Gordon returns to the farmhouse in Wastdale in the Lake District where he and two climbing companions, Arkwright and Hawke, had been in the habit of spending their Easter vacations. He is to be married to Kate Nugent in a week's time in Keswick. Gordon explains to the landlady that Arkwright had died the previous year, while climbing in Switzerland. In attempting to open a bottle of wine, Arkwright had accidentally broken the bottle and had sliced an artery in his wrist. Gordon did what he could, but in the absence of medical aid his friend had died overnight on the rockface. Gordon is estranged from his other companion Austen Hawke – they had become rivals for Kate – and he is horrified when the landlady tells him that Hawke still returns to climb every Easter, and is at this moment staying at a nearby inn.

Gordon had met Kate three years earlier at Hawke's house in London. He idolized her excessively, re-fashioning a second world in her image, and he had been unhappy when, after her mother had died eight months into their engagement, Kate had insisted on travelling alone to India to visit her uncle.

Gordon pays an evening visit to Hawke at the inn. Hawke receives him suspiciously, and apparently with fear. As he leaves to return to the farmhouse, Gordon see a woman quietly come along the lane and enter the inn. It is Kate. He finds a convenient vantage point outside Hawke's open window from where he is able to see and hear the interview. Hawke is in possession of incriminating letters, sent to him by Kate while he and she were both in India. Although she recovers some, others he keeps, evidently intending blackmail. As Kate leaves the inn, devastated and dejected, Gordon confronts her and demands an account of what happened in India.

Kate confesses that she and Hawke had had an affair, although it did not last long, he proving to be a manipulative bully. Kate says that she had never truly loved Gordon and that she had gone to India to escape the shackles of his infatuation for a while: "I always felt as if I was being lifted up reverently and set on a very high and a very small pedestal. And there I had to stand, with my heels together, and my toes turned out, in an attitude of decorum until you had gone. Well, you want people with flat heels to enjoy that. I always wore high ones, and the attitude tired me."

Gordon finds it quite impossible to change his idealistic worldview of Kate, and is oblivious to the possibility of forgiveness. He is unable to accept reality, asking her to say that it was not after all true. She should lie if she must, and he would believe the lie. That she cannot do, and the engagement evidently must be broken off. Gordon says he will take the blame upon himself.

Gordon covertly follows Hawke as he climbs in the hills, intending murder. He accosts Hawke on a high ledge in the mist, pretending the meeting was a coincidence. Hawke, seeking to be friendly, pulls out a bottle of brandy for warmth, asking Gordon to knock the neck off as the cork has been pushed in too deep. Gordon, remembering Arkwright's death and recognising an opportunity in similar circumstances, slides a hidden knife along the bottle and drives it with all his strength into Hawke's wrist. Hawke bleeds to death in the cold, and Gordon retrieves the letters from his inside pocket.

Two days later, Gordon's own body is found at the bottom of a gully at the water's edge, one hand still clutching a torn scrap of sodden paper.

== Principal characters ==
- David Gordon, young climber
- Kate ('Kitty') Nugent, Gordon's fiancée
- Austen Hawke, Gordon's former climbing companion, now rival for Kate
- Arkwright, Gordon's former climbing companion (deceased)

== Background ==
An 1896 review in The Bookman noted that the novel had had an unfortunate history, with the publisher to whom Mason had sent the manuscript dissolving their partnership while he was away climbing in the Tyrol. The manuscript disappeared, but luckily was ultimately re-found and accepted.

== Critical reception ==
In his 1923 review of contemporary authors, Arthur St John Adcock noted that the publication of this, Mason's first novel, in 1895 was well enough received by the critics, but public interest was lukewarm, and "Mason seems to have suppressed it with unnecessary rigor."

== Film adaptation ==
In 1921 the novel was adapted into a film of the same name by Maurice Elvey.
