= The Widow from Monte Carlo =

1936 film by Arthur Greville Collins

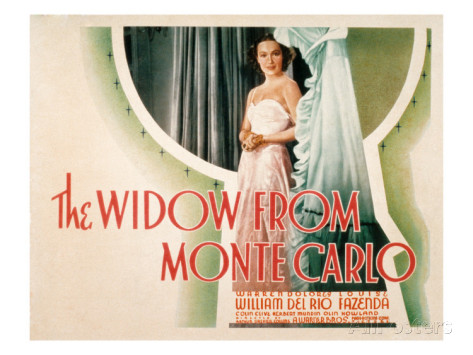
- Directed by: Arthur Greville Collins
- Written by: Charles Belden; George Bricker; F. Hugh Herbert
- Based on: A Present from Margate by Ian Hay and A.E.W. Mason
- Produced by: Bryan Foy
- Starring: Dolores del Río; Warren William; Louise Fazenda; Colin Clive
- Cinematography: Warren Lynch
- Edited by: Thomas Pratt
- Music by: Howard Jackson; Bernhard Kaun; Heinz Roemheld
- Production company: Warner Bros. Pictures
- Distributed by: Warner Bros. Pictures
- Release date: February 1, 1936
- Running time: 60 minutes
- Country: United States
- Language: English

The Widow from Monte Carlo is a 1936 American comedy film directed by Arthur Greville Collins and starring Warren William, Dolores del Río, Louise Fazenda and Colin Clive. It was based on the play A Present from Margate by Ian Hay and A.E.W. Mason. It was shot at Warner Bros.'s Burbank Studios with sets designed by the art director Hugh Reticker.

== Plot ==
Inez, the widowed Duchess of Rye, heads to Monte Carlo to escape her dull restrictive life. While there she meets Major Allan Chepstow, but later becomes engaged to a diplomat who her relatives are keen for her to marry. Impulsively Inez accepts an offer by Chepstow to join him at the seaside resort of Margate. Back in London Rose Torrent, the socially ambitious wife of a wealthy marmalade magnate, discovers about the visit and attempts to blackmail Inez into attending one of her parties. Eventually Chepstow and Inez decide to leave for Canada to start a new life together.

== Cast ==
- Warren William as Major Allan Chepstow
- Dolores del Río as Inez, Duchess of Rye
- Louise Fazenda as Rose Torrent
- Colin Clive as Lord Eric Reynolds
- Herbert Mundin as John Torrent
- Olin Howland as Eaves
- Warren Hymer as Dopey Mullins
- Eily Malyon as Lady Maynard
- E.E. Clive as Lord Holloway
- Mary Forbes as Lady Holloway
- Viva Tattersall as Joan, Inez' Secretary
- Herbert Evans as Evans, Inez' Butler
- May Beatty as Dowager
- Billy Bevan as Police Officer Watkin
- Charles Coleman as Torrent's Butler
- Gino Corrado as Torrents' Cook
- Olaf Hytten as Englishman at Casino
- Boyd Irwin as Desk Sergeant
- Alphonse Martell as Emil, Hotel Clerk
- Ferdinand Schumann-Heink as Torrents' Chauffeur

== Bibliography ==
- Goble, Alan. The Complete Index to Literary Sources in Film. Walter de Gruyter, 1999.
