= Slaves of Destiny =

1924 silent film by Maurice Elvey

Slaves of Destiny is a 1924 British silent drama film directed by Maurice Elvey and starring Matheson Lang, Valia and Henry Victor. It is based on the 1899 novel Miranda of the Balcony by A.E.W. Mason.

== Cast ==
- Matheson Lang as Luke Charnock
- Valia as Miranda Warriner
- Henry Victor as Ralph Warriner
- Humberston Wright as Hassan
- Harry Agar Lyons as Wilbrahim
