= A Present from Margate =

1933 comedy play by Ian Hay and AEW Mason

- Written by: Ian Hay; A.E.W. Mason
- Original language: English
- Genre: Comedy

Premiere
- Date premiered: 20 November 1933
- Place premiered: Palace Theatre, Manchester

A Present from Margate is a 1933 British comedy play by Ian Hay and A.E.W. Mason.

It premiered at the Palace Theatre in Manchester, before transferring to the Shaftesbury Theatre in London's West End. The cast included Reginald Gardiner, Joyce Bland, Michael Shepley and Frank Pettingell. It was produced by Athole Stewart.

== Film adaptation ==
In 1935 it was adapted by Hollywood studio Warner Brothers into a film The Widow from Monte Carlo starring Dolores del Río and Colin Clive.

== Bibliography ==
- Goble, Alan. The Complete Index to Literary Sources in Film. Walter de Gruyter, 1999.
- Wearing, J.P. The London Stage 1930-1939: A Calendar of Productions, Performers, and Personnel. Rowman & Littlefield, 2014.
