= The Drum (novel) =

1937 novel by A.E.W. Mason

- First edition
- Author: A.E.W. Mason
- Language: English
- Genre: Adventure
- Publisher: Hodder & Stoughton
- Publication date: 1937
- Publication place: United Kingdom
- Media type: Print

The Drum is an adventure novel by the British writer A.E.W. Mason which was first published in 1937. The book's action takes place on the Northwest Frontier of British India.

== Synopsis ==
Set in the India of the British Raj, the evil and untrustworthy Prince Guhl plans to wipe out the British troops as they enjoy the hospitality of Guhl's spacious palace. It is up to the loyal young Prince Azim to warn the troops of Guhl's treachery by tapping out a message on his drum.

== Film adaptation ==
The following year the novel was turned into a film The Drum directed by Zoltan Korda and made by London Film Productions at Denham Studios.
