= Running Water Farm =

Radical Faeries gathering location

Running Water Farm was the location of several gatherings of the Radical Faeries movement between 1978 and 1989.

== History ==
In 1978, Mikel Wilson, inspired by the Southeastern Conference for Lesbians and Gay Men, began annual spiritual retreats at Running Water, a remote mountain farm near Bakersville, North Carolina.

In 1979, Ron Lambe and three others, John Jones, Rocco Patt, and Peter Kendrick, purchased the farm from Wilson. They formed a for-profit corporation called Stepping Stone, Inc., to manage the equity each of them was investing. Soon, twice-yearly gatherings were scheduled and Running Water became one of the sanctuaries of the Radical Faerie movement. RFD, A Country Journal for Gay Men Everywhere was published at Running Water from 1980 to 1988.

The last official faerie gathering at Running Water occurred in 1989. According to Randy A. Riddle, the sanctuary was shut down in 1989 due to a lack of modern amenities.
