= The Truants (film) =

1922 film

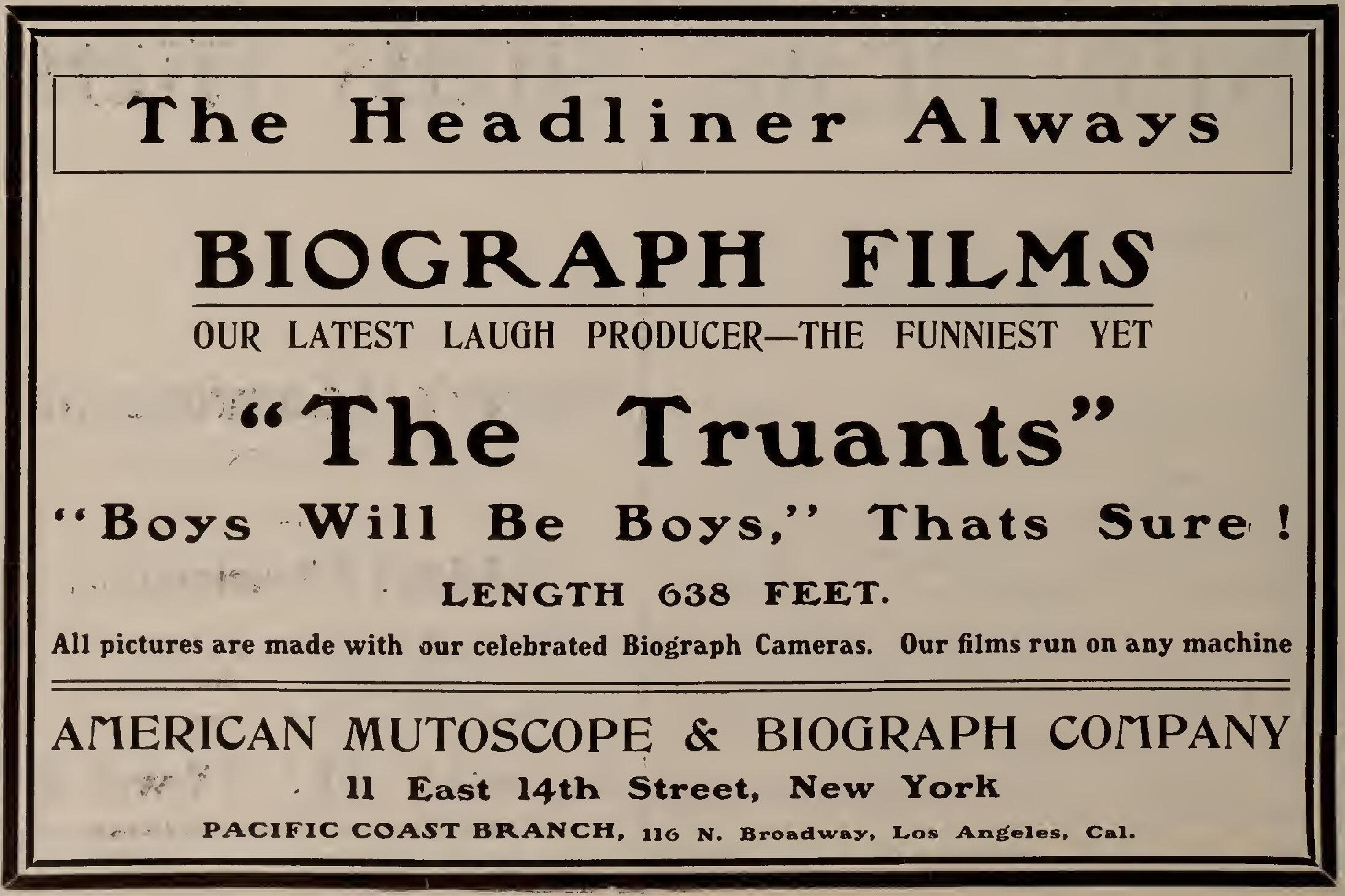
- Directed by: Sinclair Hill
- Written by: Kinchen Wood
- Starring: Joan Morgan; George Bellamy; Lewis Gilbert
- Production company: Stoll Pictures
- Distributed by: Stoll Pictures
- Release date: July 1922
- Country: United Kingdom
- Languages: Silent; English intertitles

The Truants is a 1922 British silent drama film directed by Sinclair Hill and starring Joan Morgan, George Bellamy and Lewis Gilbert. It is an adaptation of the 1904 novel The Truants by A.E.W. Mason. It was made by Britain's largest film company of the era Stoll Pictures. The film's sets were designed by art director Walter Murton.

== Premise ==
An officer deserts from the French Foreign Legion to return home to his wife's assistance.

== Cast ==
- Joan Morgan as Millie Stretton
- George Bellamy as Sir John Stretton
- Lewis Gilbert as Captain Taverney
- Phillip Simmons as Tony Stretton
- Lawford Davidson as Lionel Callam
- Robert English as John Mudge

== Bibliography ==
- Low, Rachael. History of the British Film, 1918-1929. George Allen & Unwin, 1971. ISBN 978-0047910210
