= The Truants (novel) =

1904 novel by A. E. W. Mason

- Author: A.E.W. Mason
- Language: English
- Genre: Drama
- Publication date: 1904
- Publication place: United Kingdom
- Media type: Print

The Truants is a 1904 novel by the British writer A.E.W. Mason. An English officer deserts from the French Foreign Legion to return home to confront a man who has been bothering his wife.

== Film adaptation ==
In 1922 the novel was turned into a British silent film of the same title directed by Sinclair Hill.

== Bibliography ==
- Low, Rachael. History of the British Film, 1918-1929. George Allen & Unwin, 1971.
