= The Winding Stair (band) =

Irish band

- Origin: United Kingdom
- Genres: Irish folk, folk noir
- Instrument(s): violin, cello, guitar, vocals, bodhrán
- Years active: 2005–2008
- Labels: unsigned
- Members: Clare Galway, Tom Hughes, CT
- Past members: Mary O'Halloran

The Winding Stair is a musical group from Belfast, Northern Ireland which first played publicly in 2005. The band describe their music as folk noir. Their name is associated with the poetry of W. B. Yeats.

Clare Galway on violin and vocals, Tom Hughes on cello and bodhrán and CT on guitar. Former vocalist Mary O'Halloran left the band amicably in 2008.

== Performances ==
The band have played extensively in Ireland since 2005. This has included prestigious support slots such as Martha Wainwright in Lisburn on 13 August 2007. They were also invited to play the Glastonbury Festival, appearing third on the bill at the acoustic stage on 23 June 2007. That night they shared the stage with KT Tunstall among others.

== TV and radio ==
The band were invited to perform for the Today programme on BBC Radio 4. They were asked to perform The Mountains of Mourne, originally written by Percy French, for a feature on discussions surrounding the Mourne Mountains' proposed status as a national park. This was broadcast on 29 August 2007.

On 18 October 2007, BBC Radio 1 broadcast a live session from the band. The Winding Stair also made a live appearance on the Irish language arts programme Imeall Geal on BBC Two in 2008.

== Album ==
The band self-released an album called Finistère on 5 August 2007. It was produced at Doghouse Studios in Belfast by Eamonn P Keyes, previously manager and producer of the rock band The Answer.

== Video ==
In 2007 Brian Philip Davis made a film for their song "The Meadow". It was broadcast on the third series of BBC Northern Ireland show ATL TV.

The video adopts Davis' usual magical realist approach, and it starred Lara McIvor, notable for starring in the science fiction movie City of Ember.
