= Running Water (film) =

1922 film

- Directed by: Maurice Elvey
- Written by: A.E.W. Mason (novel); Kinchen Wood
- Starring: Madge Stuart; Lawford Davidson; Julian Royce
- Production company: Stoll Pictures
- Distributed by: Stoll Pictures
- Release date: September 1922
- Country: United Kingdom
- Languages: Silent; English intertitles

Running Water is a 1922 British silent drama film directed by Maurice Elvey and starring Madge Stuart, Lawford Davidson and Julian Royce. The film is an adaptation of A.E.W. Mason's 1906 novel Running Water.

== Cast ==
- Madge Stuart as Sylvia Skinner
- Lawford Davidson as Capt. Hilary Cheyne
- Julian Royce as Garrett Skinner
- A. Bromley Davenport as Capt. Barstow
- Irene Rooke as Mrs. Thesiger
- George Turner as Wallie Hine
- E. Lewis Waller as Archie Parminter
- George Harrington as Michel

== Bibliography ==
- Low, Rachael. History of the British Film, 1918-1929. George Allen & Unwin, 1971.
