= The Winding Stair (novel) =

1923 novel by A. E. W. Mason

- First edition
- Author: A. E. W. Mason
- Language: English
- Set in: Morocco
- Publisher: Hodder & Stoughton
- Publication date: 1923
- Media type: Print
- Pages: 308

The Winding Stair is a 1923 novel of romance and adventure by A. E. W. Mason, originally published by Hodder & Stoughton. Set largely in Morocco, the story follows the adventures of Paul Ravenel as he seeks to atone for the disgrace that still attaches to his family name due to the actions of his father who many years earlier in British India had been court-martialled after leaving a key hill fort unguarded.

== Plot ==
Paul Ravenel, the son of a French mother and a British father, has been educated largely in France. His mother died when he was young and he had a distant relationship with his father, never understanding why he had renounced his own country, taken his wife's name and nationality, and cut himself off completely from his British friends. Following his father's death, Ravenel comes back to England, aged 18, to seek information from his father's old London lawyer about the mystery. When he explains that he wishes to resume his old surname and nationality, and to take a commission in the British Army, he is warned that this might not be possible because of the disgrace that is still attached to his father's name, Revel. He learns that as a young British officer in India his father had been court-martialled and disgraced after leaving a key hill fort unguarded, contrary to orders.

Determined to atone for his father's crime, Ravenel seeks a commission in the French army and is sent to Morocco where he meets and falls in love with Marguerite Lambert, a penniless English woman who – although from a good family – has been forced to earn her keep as a dancer at a disreputable establishment in Casablanca. When Marguerite loses her job Ravenel rescues her, secretly taking her on to Fez when his battalion is posted there. Hearing one night that there is to be an uprising against the French who now rule the city he tries to warn his superior officers, but they do not believe him. Afraid that Marguerite is in mortal danger, he decides to stay with her rather than rejoin his unit. Facing inevitable disgrace as a deserter, Ravenel disappears. Most of his comrades believe him to have been killed in the subsequent massacre of Europeans in the city, but his friend and fellow officer Gerard de Montignac is not so sure and tries to trace him. Discovering that Ravenel had been helped by some moorish friends, de Montignac abandons his search.

Some two years later, de Montignac is ordered to take a battalion into the sacred and closed city of Mulai Idris, to force it at last to open its gates to the world. There he discovers Ravenel, living under an assumed name as a moor, along with Marguerite. Still angry at Ravenel’s treachery, de Montignac contemplates shooting him, but changes his mind when he understands that Marguerite will inevitably take her own life. The couple realise that the day-to-day constraints upon them have become intolerable. They agree that Ravenel should stake all on one final 'splendid throw', and rejoin the French army – this time as a moor. He fights bravely, is awarded the médaille militaire, and is discovered in a military hospital by de Montignac, who seeks his help for a secret mission. Ravenel is to infiltrate an enemy camp and relay its changing position to his French commanders so that aeroplanes – frightening devices never before seen by the soldiers – can be brought in to bomb it. Ravenel is almost killed but his mission is successful, the camp is ultimately destroyed, and he is reunited with Marguerite.

The London lawyer, now an old man, receives a telegram informing him that Ravenel is returning home, invalided, with a wife. He asks his clerk to get out the necessary forms for securing English nationality.

== Literary significance and criticism ==
On the book's publication The Spectator said that the story "is concerned with the difficulties of the French in their occupation of their portion of Morocco, and presents a vivid picture of that country". The reviewer considered that admirers of Mr. Mason's writing would find it pleasant reading, and said that the book was already proving itself to be a best seller.

== Title ==
The novel's title comes from a passage in Francis Bacon's Essays Civil and Moral: Of Great Place, which is quoted as the frontispiece: "All rising to great place is by a winding stair".

== Film adaptation ==
- The Winding Stair (silent, 1925)
