= The Winding Stair (film) =

1925 film

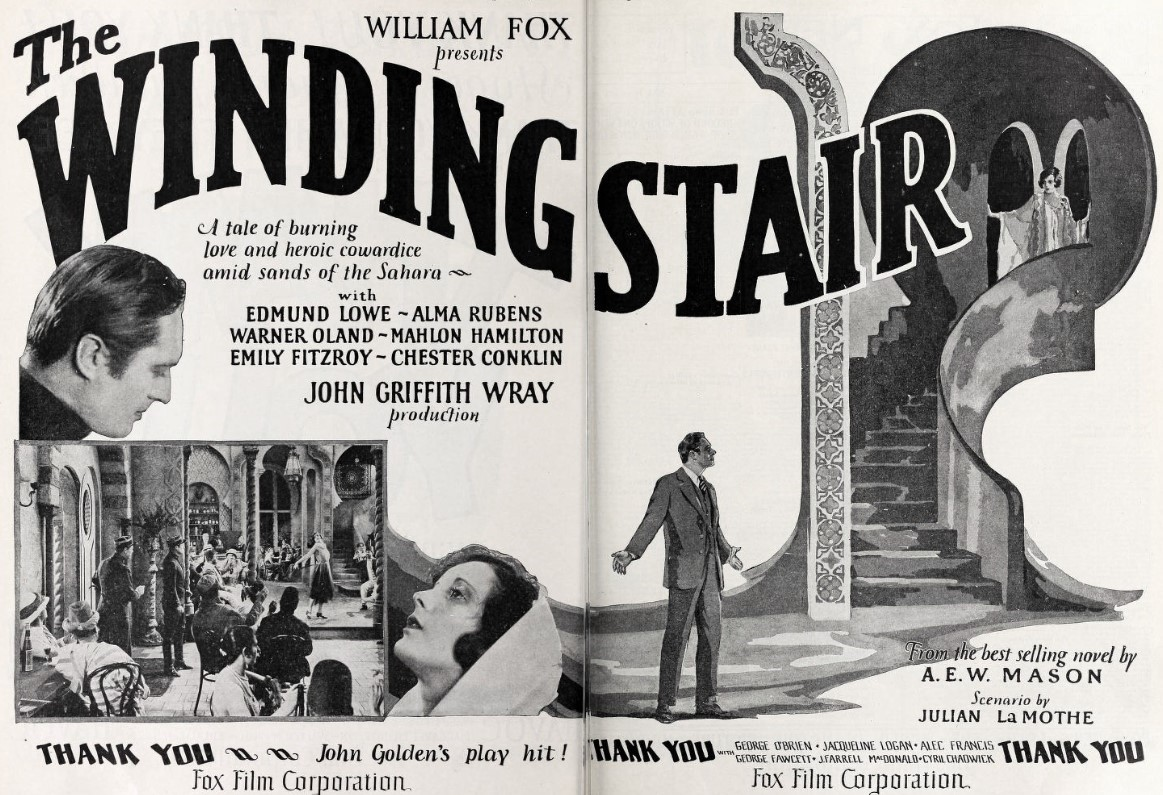
- Advertisement
- Directed by: John Griffith Wray
- Written by: Julian La Mothe
- Based on: The Winding Stair by A.E.W. Mason
- Produced by: William Fox
- Starring: Alma Rubens; Edmund Lowe; Warner Oland
- Cinematography: Karl Struss
- Production company: Fox Film Corporation
- Distributed by: Fox Film Corporation
- Release date: October 25, 1925
- Running time: 60 minutes
- Country: United States
- Language: Silent (English intertitles)

The Winding Stair is a lost 1925 American silent drama film directed by John Griffith Wray and starring Alma Rubens, Edmund Lowe, and Warner Oland. It is based on the 1923 novel of the same name by the British writer A.E.W. Mason.

== Plot ==
As described in a film magazine review, a French Legionnaire on foreign station loves a cafe dancer, and when the natives rebel and the young woman is endangered, the officer leaves his command to go to the woman's aid. His friend saves him from court-martial and he heads a regiment in the World War. When the war ends, he marries the dancer.

== Cast ==
- Alma Rubens as Marguerite
- Edmund Lowe as Paul
- Warner Oland as Petras
- Mahlon Hamilton as Gerard
- Emily Fitzroy as Madame Muller
- Chester Conklin as Onery
- Frank Leigh as Andrea
- Zalla Zarana as Fifi
- Jane Thomas

== Preservation ==
With no prints of The Winding Stair located in any film archives, it is lost film.

== Bibliography ==
- Goble, Alan (1999). The Complete Index to Literary Sources in Film. Walter de Gruyter. ISBN 1-85739-229-9
