= Roger Lancelyn Green =

British writer (1918–1987)

- Born: 2 November 1918; Norwich, Norfolk, England, UK
- Died: 8 October 1987 (aged 68); Poulton Hall, Wirral, Merseyside, England, UK
- Education: English
- Alma mater: Merton College, Oxford
- Occupations: Novelist, Biographer
- Spouse: June Lancelyn Green
- Children: 3, including Richard Lancelyn Green
- Writing career
- Genres: Biography, Fantasy, Mythology
- Notable works: King Arthur and His Knights of the Round Table, Robin Hood, Tales of the Greek Heroes

Roger Gilbert Lancelyn Green (2 November 1918 – 8 October 1987) was a British biographer and children's writer. He was an Oxford academic. He had a positive influence on his friend, C. S. Lewis, by encouraging him to publish The Lion, the Witch and the Wardrobe.

== Biography ==
Roger Lancelyn Green was born in 1918 in Norwich, England, to Major Gilbert Arthur Lancelyn Green (1887–1947), of the Royal Artillery, and Helena Mary Phyllis, daughter of Lt-Col Charles William Henry Sealy, of Hambledon House, Hampshire. The landed gentry Lancelyn Green family can be traced back to 1093, with the marriage of Randle Greene [sic] and Elizabeth, daughter of William Lancelyn, taking place in the reign of Elizabeth I.

He began his education at Dane Court, Pyrford and Liverpool College, after which he studied under C. S. Lewis at Merton College, Oxford, where he obtained a B.Litt. degree. As an undergraduate, he performed in the Oxford University Dramatic Society's Shakespeare dramas produced by Nevill Coghill. He was deputy librarian at Merton College from 1945 to 1950, then William Noble Research Fellow in English Literature at the University of Liverpool from 1950 to 1952. As Andrew Lang Lecturer at the University of St Andrews from 1968 to 1969, he delivered the 1968 Andrew Lang lecture.

Lancelyn Green remained close to Lewis until the latter's death in 1963, and holidayed in Greece with Lewis and his wife Joy Gresham just before her death from cancer in 1960. When Lewis started writing the Narnia books in the late 1940s, Lancelyn Green suggested that they should be called The Chronicles of Narnia.

Lancelyn Green lived in Cheshire at Poulton Hall, a manor house that his ancestors had owned for more than 900 years; he was Lord of the Manors of Poulton-Lancelyn and Lower Bebington. He died on 8 October 1987 at the age of 68.

One of his sons was the writer Richard Lancelyn Green.

== Works ==
=== Fiction ===
Lancelyn Green became known primarily for his writings for children, particularly his retellings of the myths of Greece (Tales of the Greek Heroes and The Tale of Troy) and Egypt (Tales of Ancient Egypt), as well the Norse mythology (The Saga of Asgard, later renamed Myths of the Norsemen) and the stories of King Arthur (King Arthur and His Knights of the Round Table) and Robin Hood (The Adventures of Robin Hood). His works of original fiction include The Luck of Troy, set during the Trojan War, and The Land of the Lord High Tiger, a fantasy that has been compared to the Narnia books.

Chronological order

- The Singing Rose and Other Poems (Edmund Ward 1947)
- "From the World's End" (1948)
- The Luck of the Lynns (1952)
- King Arthur and His Knights of the Round Table (1954)
- The Adventures of Robin Hood (1956)
- The Book of Nonsense (1956)
- Two Satyr Plays: Euripides' Cyclops and Sophocles' Ichneutai (1957)
- The Land of the Lord High Tiger (1958)
- Tales of the Greek Heroes: Retold From the Ancient Authors (1958)
- The Tale of Troy: Retold from the Ancient Authors (1958)
- Mystery at Mycenae: An Adventure Story of Ancient Greece (1959)
- Myths of the Norsemen: Retold from the Old Norse Poems and Tales (1960)
- A Century of Humorous Verse 1850–1950 (J. M. Dent & Sons 1959)
- The Luck of Troy (1961)
- Once Long Ago: Folk and Fairy Tales of the World (1962, illustrations by Vojtěch Kubašta)
- Authors & Places: A Literary Pilgrimage (1963)
- Tellers of Tales : British Authors of Children’s Books from 1800 to 1964 (1965)
- Tales the Muses Told: Ancient Greek Myths (1965)
- Tales from Shakespeare (Atheneum 1965)
- Tales of Ancient Egypt (1967)
- Ancient Greece (John Day Co. 1969)
- A Cavalcade of Dragons (H. Z. Walck 1970)
- A Cavalcade of Magicians (H. Z. Walck 1973)
- Strange Adventures in Time (1974, editor, drawings by George Adamson, J. M. Dent & Sons Ltd, London; E. P. Dutton & Co., Inc., New York)
- The Tale of Thebes (Cambridge University Press 1977)
- The Beaver Book of Other Worlds (1978)

=== Biographies ===
Lancelyn Green wrote biographies of J. M. Barrie, Andrew Lang, and C. S. Lewis. His new edition of selected tales of Hans Christian Andersen contains a short biography. He also wrote a brief biography of Anthony Hope as the introduction to a one-volume Everyman's Library edition of The Prisoner of Zenda and its sequel Rupert of Hentzau. He was editor of the Kipling Journal, 1957–1979.

Lancelyn Green was particularly interested in Lewis Carroll, publishing several books and articles. His book The Story of Lewis Carroll (1949) led to an invitation from Carroll's nieces, Violet and Menella Dodgson, to produce an edited version of his diary; this appeared in 1953, and has been at the centre of the recent debate about the alleged 'Carroll Myth'. Karoline Leach devoted much space to considering it in her book In the Shadow of the Dreamchild, claiming that something like 60% of the diary material was left out of this publication, and that Lancelyn Green's allegedly partial, inaccurate and misleading editing had contributed to a continued misrepresentation of Carroll in biographies and the media. At the time of publication, Lancelyn Green claimed to have seen all the diaries and certainly gave the impression he had been allowed unrestricted access; however, Leach alleges he later retracted this claim and admitted he had been forced to work with heavily edited transcripts prepared for him by Menella Dodgson, 'for reasons of safety'. He was later a founder and vice-president of the Lewis Carroll Society and helped Morton N. Cohen to edit Carroll's collected letters.

Chronological order

- Andrew Lang: A Critical Biography (E. Ward, 1946)
- The Story of Lewis Carroll (H. Schuman, 1951)
- A. E. W. Mason : The Adventure of a Story Teller (Max Parrish, 1952)
- The Letters of Lewis Carroll, 2 volumes (1953)
- Fifty Years of Peter Pan (Peter Davies, 1954)
- Into Other Worlds : Space-Flight in fiction, from Lucian to Lewis (Abelard-Schuman, 1957)
- J. M. Barrie (Bodley Head, 1960)
- Lewis Carroll (Bodley Head, 1960)
- Mrs Molesworth (Bodley Head, 1961)
- The Readers' Guide to Rudyard Kipling's Work (R. E. Harboard, 1962)
- Kipling and the Children (Elek Books, 1965)
- Henry Treece, C. S. Lewis and Beatrix Potter (Bodley Head Ltd, 1969) with Margery Fisher and Marcus Crouch
- C. S. Lewis: A Biography (1974) with Walter Hooper

== Other activities and posts ==
Green was a part-time professional actor from 1942 to 1945. He was deputy librarian of Merton College, Oxford, from 1945 to 1950 and William Nobel Research Fellow in English Literature at the University of Liverpool from 1950 to 1952. He was later a member of the Council of the University of Liverpool, from 1964 to 1971.
