= List of ship names of the Royal Navy =

This is an alphabetical list of the names of all ships that have been in service with the Royal Navy, or with predecessor fleets formally in the service of the Kingdom of England or the Commonwealth of England. The list also includes fictional vessels which have prominently featured in literature about the Royal Navy. Names are traditionally re-used over the years, and have been carried by more than one ship.

Altogether over 13,000 ships have been in service with the Royal Navy.

Unlike many other naval services, the Royal Navy designates certain types of shore establishment (e.g. barracks, naval air stations and training establishments) as "ships" and names them accordingly. These establishments are often referred to in service slang as stone frigates.

== Lists of ship names ==
Due to the large number of names the list has been split into smaller lists:

=== Alphabetical ===
- List of ship names of the Royal Navy (A)
- List of ship names of the Royal Navy (B)
- List of ship names of the Royal Navy (C)
- List of ship names of the Royal Navy (D–F)
- List of ship names of the Royal Navy (G–H)
- List of ship names of the Royal Navy (I–L)
- List of ship names of the Royal Navy (M–N)
- List of ship names of the Royal Navy (O–Q)
- List of ship names of the Royal Navy (R–T)
- List of ship names of the Royal Navy (U–Z)

=== By type of ship ===
- List of active Royal Navy ships
- List of aircraft carriers of the Royal Navy
- List of amphibious warfare ships of the Royal Navy
- List of pre-dreadnought battleships of the Royal Navy
- List of dreadnought battleships of the Royal Navy
- List of battlecruisers of the Royal Navy
- List of bomb vessels of the Royal Navy
- List of cruiser classes of the Royal Navy
- List of destroyers of the Royal Navy
- List of fast patrol boats of the Royal Navy
- List of frigates of the Royal Navy
- List of corvettes and sloops of the Royal Navy
- List of gunboats and gunvessels of the Royal Navy
- List of gun-brigs of the Royal Navy
- List of ironclads of the Royal Navy
- List of monitors of the Royal Navy
- List of mine countermeasure vessels of the Royal Navy (includes minesweepers and mine hunters)
- List of Royal Prison ship names
- List of Royal Fleet Auxiliary ship names
- List of ships of the line of the Royal Navy
- List of submarines of the Royal Navy
- List of survey vessels of the Royal Navy
- List of Royal Navy shore establishments

=== By namesake ===
- List of people with Royal Navy ships named after them

== Fictional RN ship names ==
Many novels and films about the Royal Navy feature fictional ships, but most use real names. This is a list of fictional names of note. Where real ship names are used fictionally, there is a link to the actual ships using that name.

=== Fictional wooden RN ships ===
==== In novels ====
- Argonaute (from Colours Aloft by Alexander Kent)
- Atropos (from Hornblower and the Atropos by C. S. Forester)
- Bellipotent (from Billy Budd, Sailor by Herman Melville)
- Caligula (from A Ship of the Line by C. S. Forester)
- Clam (from Hornblower in the West Indies by C. S. Forester)
- Clorinda (from Hornblower in the West Indies by C. S. Forester)
- Crab (from Hornblower in the West Indies by C. S. Forester)
- Harvey and Moth (bomb ketches) (from The Commodore by C. S. Forester)
- Flame (from Lord Hornblower by C. S. Forester)
- Friday (from a 1970s urban myth)
- Harpy (from Mr Midshipman Easy by Captain Frederick Marryat)
- Hotspur (from Hornblower and the Hotspur by C. S. Forester)
- Justinian (from Mr. Midshipman Hornblower by C. S. Forester)
- Lotus (from The Commodore by C. S. Forester)
- Lydia (from The Happy Return by C. S. Forester)
- Nightingale (from Hornblower and the Atropos by C. S. Forester)
- Nonsuch (from The Commodore by C. S. Forester)
- Phoebe (from Hornblower in the West Indies by C. S. Forester)
- Pinafore (from the operetta H.M.S. Pinafore by Gilbert and Sullivan)
- Polychrest (from Post Captain by Patrick O'Brian)
- Porta Coeli (from Lord Hornblower by C. S. Forester)
- Pucelle (from Sharpe's Trafalgar by Bernard Cornwell)
- Pluto (from A Ship of the Line by C. S. Forester)
- Renown (from Lieutenant Hornblower by C. S. Forester)
- Roebuck (from Hornblower in the West Indies by C. S. Forester)
- Sophie (from Master and Commander by Patrick O'Brian; based on the actual HMS Speedy)
- Surprise (from HMS Surprise by Patrick O'Brian; based on the actual frigate HMS Surprise)
- Sutherland (from A Ship of the Line and Flying Colours by C. S. Forester)
- Themis (from Under Enemy Colors by S. Thomas Russell)
- Witch of Endor (from Flying Colours by C. S. Forester)

==== In film, television and radio ====
- Avenger (from 1962 Peter Ustinov/Terence Stamp film Billy Budd)
- Dauntless and Interceptor (from the 2003 film Pirates of the Caribbean: The Curse of the Black Pearl; a fictional HMS Dauntless is the "flagship of the Royal Navy"; HMS Interceptor – described as the "fastest vessel in the Navy" – is played by the replica ship Lady Washington). In later films Dauntless is replaced by Endeavour, the vessel that became a new flagship of the Royal Navy.
- Defiant (from 1962 Alec Guinness/Dirk Bogarde film HMS Defiant)
- Indefatigable and Hotspur (from 1999 Ioan Gruffudd TV series Hornblower; HMS Indefatigable portrayed by replica frigate Grand Turk; Hotspur portrayed by Earl of Pembroke)
- Providence (from the 2011 film Pirates of the Caribbean: On Stranger Tides; portrayed by replica ship HMS Surprise)
- Surprise (from 2003 Russell Crowe film Master and Commander; portrayed by replica ship HMS Surprise )
- Travail (from the 1975 and 2015–2019 series Poldark)
- Venus (from 1962 Kenneth Williams/Bernard Cribbins comedy film Carry On Jack)

=== Fictional metal RN ships ===
==== Pre-World War II ====
- The original 1920s edition of the H. P. Gibson naval board game Dover Patrol used a number of real RN ship names, but generally attached them to different ship classes. Thus the "Flagships" were H.M.S. Nelson and Drake, and the "Super Dreadnoughts" were H.M.S. Australia, New Zealand, Canada and India, but few of these resembled the actual ships with the same names in the drawings used on the playing pieces. The "Dreadnoughts" were given all new 'County' names: H.M.S. Surrey, Middlesex, Lancashire and Yorkshire, and the "Battle Cruisers" had 'Town' names: H.M.S. London, Birmingham, Liverpool, Manchester, Edinburgh and Glasgow. "Light Cruisers" had animal names: Lion, Tiger, Panther, Greyhound, Antelope, Zebra, Viper and Vixen; "Destroyers" had 'Bird' names: Albatross, Eagle, Hawk, Heron, Kingfisher, Seagull, Raven and Vulture; and "Auxiliary Cruisers" were given insect names: Ant, Bee, Firefly, Gnat, Grasshopper, Hornet, Mosquito and Wasp. In the revised edition of the game published after World War II, the "Flagships" and "Vice Flagships" were unnamed, but all the other names shown above were retained, including the four wholly fictional county names given to the "Battleships" (reclassified from "Dreadnoughts").
- Charybdis ("third-class cruiser"); also "H M Battlecruiser Leopard" and "her attendant light cruiser Penzance" (from the 1931 novel Brown on Resolution by C. S. Forester)
- Clampherdown (from The Ballad of the "Clampherdown" by Rudyard Kipling (1892); satirising the Admiral-class battleships HMS Camperdown and Benbow)
- Rutland and Leopard ("second-class cruiser" and "armoured cruiser" respectively, in the 1935 John Mills film Brown on Resolution; portrayed by C-class cruiser Curacoa, Destroyer Leader Broke, and Leander-class cruiser Neptune)
- Thunder Child (an "ironclad torpedo ram" from the 1898 novel The War of the Worlds by H. G. Wells)

==== In World War II novels ====
- Antigone (Leander-class cruiser from The Cruiser by Warren Tute)
- Apache (Tribal-class destroyer in the short story Gold From Crete by C. S. Forester)
- Artemis (from The Ship by C. S. Forester; inspired by Arethusa-class cruiser HMS Penelope)
- Colony, River, and Saltash (River and Colony-class frigates in H M Frigate (1946) and the novel The Cruel Sea (1951) by Nicholas Monsarrat. In the 1953 film version HMS Saltash was depicted by Castle-class corvette: HMS Portchester Castle, and hence named Saltash Castle)
- Compass Rose and Flower (Flower-class corvettes in the short story H M Corvette (1942) and the novel The Cruel Sea (1951) by Nicholas Monsarrat)
- Conqueror (battleship frequently referred to in the novel The Destroyers by Douglas Reeman; clearly based on HMS Hood)
- Defender, Wrestler, Invader, and Blue Ranger (escort carriers of the 14th Aircraft Carrier Squadron in Alistair MacLean's novel HMS Ulysses)
- Dipper and Winger ( Kingfisher-class corvettes in the stories East Coast Corvette (1943) and Corvette Command (1944), by Nicholas Monsarrat; republished with H M Corvette as Three Corvettes in 1945)
- Gladiator (G-class destroyer in the novel Killing Ground by Douglas Reeman)
- Jubilee (minesweeper in Nicholas Monsarrat's unfinished final novel The Master Mariner)
- Lomond (leader of a flotilla of fictional V and W-class destroyers in the novel The Destroyers by Douglas Reeman)
- Marlborough (from the short story "HMS Marlborough Will Enter Harbour" by Nicholas Monsarrat; based on a 1927 sloop)
- Nairn (River-class frigate in Alistair MacLean's 1955 novel HMS Ulysses)
- Sirdar (S-class destroyer in Alistair MacLean's novels The Guns of Navarone and Force 10 From Navarone)
- Ulysses (from HMS Ulysses by Alistair MacLean, based on a fictional Dido-class cruiser)
- Vagabond (V and W-class destroyer in the 1989 novel The Fighting Spirit by Charles Gidley (Wheeler))
- Vectra and Viking (escorts of the 14th Aircraft Carrier Squadron in Alistair MacLean's novel HMS Ulysses)
- Viperous (V and W-class destroyer from the novel The Cruel Sea (1953) by Nicholas Monsarrat)
- Ventnor, Victor, Warden, Warlock, Waxwing, Whiplash and Whirlpool (members of a flotilla of fictional V and W-class destroyers in the novel The Destroyers by Douglas Reeman)
- Wildebeeste (almost certainly a destroyer, operating alongside the main character's unnamed destroyer in the novel Pincher Martin by William Golding)

==== In World War II films ====
- Amesbury, Cambridge, and Stratford, (from the 1953 Michael Rennie film Single-Handed or Sailor of the King, based on the novel Brown on Resolution by C. S. Forester; portrayed by Dido-class cruiser: HMS Cleopatra, Abdiel-class minelayer HMS Manxman, and Town-class cruiser HMS Glasgow)
- Ballantrae (in the 1951 Trevor Howard film Gift Horse; based on HMS Campbeltown, portrayed by HMS Leamington)
- Compass Rose and Saltash Castle (in the 1953 film The Cruel Sea; portrayed by corvettes HMS Coreopsis and HMS Portchester Castle. In Nicholas Monsarrat's original book, HMS Saltash was a larger River-class frigate)
- Rockhampton (in the 1955 John Wayne film The Sea Chase; portrayed by River-class frigate HMCS New Glasgow)
- Sea Tiger (submarine, in the 1943 film We Dive at Dawn; portrayed by Turkish S-class submarines P614 and P615)
- Solent (the only fictional ship in the 1960 Kenneth More film Sink the Bismarck!; portrayed by Battle-class destroyer HMS Hogue)
- HMS Torrin (in the 1942 Noël Coward film In Which We Serve; portrayed by N-class destroyer HMAS Nepal)

==== Post-war novels ====
- Aries (Leander-class frigate from The Zhukov Briefing by Antony Trew)
- Beaufort (Type 23 frigate in Mike Lunnon-Wood's novel King's Shilling)
- Belligerent (assault ship from The Zhukov Briefing by Antony Trew)
- Bluewhale (Porpoise-class submarine from The Zhukov Briefing by Antony Trew)
- Carousel (from We Saw the Sea by John Winton; based on C-class destroyers in the Dartmouth Training Squadron)
- Leviathan (aircraft carrier from the novel HMS Leviathan by John Winton; the real Majestic-class carrier with this name was never completed)
- Medusa (an "obsolete frigate" in the 1988 novel Medusa by Hammond Innes)
- Pandora (Leander-class frigate from One of our Warships by John Winton)
- Seahorse (submarine from Down the Hatch and All the Nice Girls by John Winton)
- Temeraire (fictional Resolution-class submarine from The Fighting Temeraire by John Winton)

==== Post-war film and media ====
- Aristotle (from the 1958 Frankie Howerd comedy film Further Up the Creek; portrayed by a Type 14 frigate)
- Bedford, Chester, Devonshire (Type 23 frigates in 1997 James Bond film Tomorrow Never Dies)
- Berkeley (from 1957 Peter Sellers comedy film Up the Creek, portrayed by Castle-class corvette HMS Berkeley Castle)
- Dorchester (in the 1960 Norman Wisdom film The Bulldog Breed, portrayed by a Type 14 Blackwood-class frigate)
- Gillingham (from the 1956 John Mills film The Baby and the Battleship, portrayed by HMS Birmingham)
- Goliath, (a fictional 'M-Class Nuclear Stealth Submarine') from the 2005 BBC radio comedy Deep Trouble
- Hero (from the 1970s BBC drama series Warship; portrayed by the Leander-class frigate HMS Phoebe, among others)
- Makepeace (generic destroyer from the 1960s radio comedy The Navy Lark)
- HMS Monarch (2) (Type 23 frigate in the Action Stations exhibit at Portsmouth Historic Dockyard)
- Ranger (Resolution-class submarine in the 1977 James Bond film The Spy Who Loved Me)
- Sherwood (in the 1957 A. E. Matthews comedy film Carry on Admiral; portrayed by a Daring-class destroyer)
- Suffolk (from the 2004 ITV drama series Making Waves; portrayed by the Type 23 frigate HMS Grafton and others)
- Troutbridge (from the 1959–1977 radio comedy The Navy Lark; inspired by the Type 15 frigate: HMS Troubridge).
- Trumpton (in the 1959 film version of The Navy Lark; the action is transferred to an inshore minesweeper, portrayed by HMS Reedham)
- Vigil (Vanguard-class submarine from the BBC drama Vigil)
- Virtue (Vanguard-class submarine mentioned in the BBC drama Vigil)

== See also ==
- Arctic Whale-class whaler
- Bibliography of 18th–19th century Royal Naval history
