= List of fictional ships =

This list of fictional ships includes all manner of artificial vehicles supported by water, which are either the subject of, or an important element of, a notable work of fiction or a work by a notable author or creator. It is not meant to be a comprehensive list of every fictional ship.

== Anime and manga ==
- Blue 6, Shang 9 – Blue Submarine No. 6
- Going Merry – One Piece
- Harekaze – High School Fleet
- Illustria – Macross Zero
- Musashi – High School Fleet
- The School Ship – Girls und Panzer
- Yashiromaru – Detective Conan: Strategy Above the Depths

== Comics ==
- Nautilus – The League of Extraordinary Gentlemen, 1999
- Unicorn – The Adventures of Tintin stories The Secret of the Unicorn, 1943, and Red Rackham's Treasure, 1944

== Film ==
- African Queen – The African Queen, 1951
- USS Alameda (LPD-32) – Godzilla, 2014
- Albatross – The Sea Hawk, 1940
- Argo – galley, Jason and the Argonauts, 1963, 2000
- USS Aspen – Full Fathom Five, 1990
- USS Bedford (DLG-113) – The Bedford Incident, 1965
- USS Belinda (APA-22) – Away All Boats, 1956
- Black Pearl – Pirates of the Caribbean: The Curse of the Black Pearl, 2003
- USS Caine – The Caine Mutiny, 1954
- USS Copperfin – Destination Tokyo, 1943
- H.M.S. Defiant – H.M.S. Defiant, 1962
- HMS Devonshire –Tomorrow Never Dies, 1997
- Fuwalda – Tarzan of the Apes, 1918
- USS Haynes – The Enemy Below, 1957
- USS Keeling – Greyhound, 2020
- Mary Deare – The Wreck of the Mary Deare, 1959
- Morning Cloud – Tai-Pan, 1986
- Nautilus – 20,000 Leagues Under the Sea (1954), Mysterious Island (1961), Captain Nemo and the Underwater City (1969), and The League of Extraordinary Gentlemen (2003)
- Red October – The Hunt for Red October, 1990
- USS San Pablo – The Sand Pebbles, 1966
- USS Sea Tiger – Operation Petticoat, 1959
- USS Stingray –Down Periscope, 1996
- HMS Surprise – Master and Commander: The Far Side of the World, 2003
- USS Tampa Bay – Hunter Killer, 2018
- USS Thunderfish – Operation Pacific, 1951
- USS Tigerfish – Ice Station Zebra, 1968
- USS Tigershark – The Atomic Submarine, 1959
- Titanic II – Titanic II, 2010
- Titanic III – Titanic 666, 2022
- HMS Torrin – In Which We Serve, 1942
- HMS Trumpton – The Navy Lark, 1959
- Tsimtsum – Life of Pi, 2012
- U-571 – U-571, 2000
- USS Ulysses – Crash Dive, 1996
- HMS Venus – Carry On Jack, 1962
- We're Here – Captains Courageous, 1937
- White Witch – Tai-Pan, 1986
- Wonkatania – Willy Wonka & the Chocolate Factory, 1971
- Yellow Submarine – Yellow Submarine, 1968

== Literature ==
=== Folklore ===
- Courser or the Tuscarora – Alfred Bulltop Stormalong's clipper ship
- HMS Friday – British Royal Navy urban legend

=== Novels ===
- USS Abraham Lincoln – Twenty Thousand Leagues Under the Seas by Jules Verne, 1868
- African Queen – The African Queen by C. S. Forester, 1935
- Amazon – Swallows and Amazons by Arthur Ransome, 1930
- HMS Amazon – Mr Midshipman Fury by G. S. Beard, 2006
- USS America – America by Stephen Coonts, 2001
- HMS Andromeda – Beneath the Aurora, 1995, and The Shadow of the Eagle, 1997, by Richard Woodman
- HMS Antigone – Baltic Mission by Richard Woodman, 1986
- HMS Antigone – The Cruiser by Warren Tute, 1955
- Araby – Captain of the Araby by Howard Pease, 1953
- Ariel – The Narrative of Arthur Gordon Pym of Nantucket by Edgar Allan Poe, 1838
- HMS Argonaute – Colours Aloft! by Alexander Kent,1986
- HMS Artemis – The Ship by C. S. Forester, 1943
- HMS Athena – Royal Yankee by Victor Suthren, 1987
- USS Athena (PC-15) – The Oceans and the Stars: A Sea Story, A War Story, A Love Story by Mark Helprin, 2023
- HMS Atropos – Hornblower and the Atropos by C. S. Forester, 1953
- USS Barracuda (SSN-593) – To Kill the Potemkin by Mark Joseph, 1986
- HMS Benbecula – Rendezvous-South Atlantic by Douglas Reeman
- USS Belinda (APA-22) – Away All Boats by Kenneth M. Dodson, 1954
- HMS Bellipotent – Billy Budd by Herman Melville, 1924
- Bloodhound – In the Belly of the Bloodhound by Louis A. Meyer, 2002
- Britannia – In Search of the Castaways by Jules Verne, 1867–1868
- Busted Flush – The Deep Blue Good-by by John D. MacDonald
- USS Caine –The Caine Mutiny by Herman Wouk, 1951
- HMS Calypso – The Captain from Connecticut by C. S. Forester, 1941
- HMS Calypso – Ramage's Mutiny by Dudley Pope, 1977
- HMS Carousel – We Saw The Sea by John Winton
- Carpco Valparaiso – Towing Jehova by James Morrow, 1994
- HMS Clorinda – Hornblower in the West Indies by C. S. Forester, 1957
- Cotton Blossom – Show Boat by Edna Ferber, 1926
- USS Columbia – The Intruders by Stephen Coonts, 1994
- HMS Compass Rose – The Cruel Sea by Nicholas Monsarrat, 1951
- Covenant – Kidnapped by Robert Louis Stevenson, 1886
- HMS Diane – The Thirteen-Gun Salute by Patrick O'Brian, 1989
- Dawn Treader – The Voyage of the Dawn Treader by C. S. Lewis
- Dazzler – The Cruise of the Dazzler by Jack London, 1902
- USS Delaware – The Captain from Connecticut by C. S. Forester, 1941
- Demeter – Dracula by Bram Stoker, 1897
- HMS Destiny – Stand into Danger by Alexander Kent, 1980
- HMS Diana – Golden Galleon by Victor Suthren, 1989
- HMS Dido – Ramage and the Dido by Dudley Pope, 1989
- HMS Dolphin – Bloody Jack by Louis A. Meyer, 2002
- USS Dolphin – Ice Station Zebra by Alistair MacLean, 1963
- USS Dragonfish – Raise the Titanic! by Clive Cussler, 1976
- USS Barracuda – To Kill the Potemkin by Mark Joseph, 1986
- Dulcibella – The Riddle of the Sands by Erskine Childers, 1903
- Duncan – In Search of the Castaways by Jules Verne, 1867
- The Durmstrang ship – Harry Potter and the Goblet of Fire by J. K. Rowling, 2000
- USS Eel – Run Silent, Run Deep, 1955, and Dust on the Sea, 1972, by Edward L. Beach Jr.
- Erasmus – Shōgun by James A. Michener, 1975
- Erebus – Alaska by James A. Michener, 1988
- Flying Dutch – Flying Dutch by Tom Holt, 1991
- Flying Dutchman – The Death Ship by William Clark Russell, 1888
- Flying Dutchman – The Crew of the Flying Dutchman by Henry A. Hering, 1896
- Flying Dutchman – A Primer of Imaginary Geography by Brander Matthews, 1894
- Flying Dutchman – Castaways of the Flying Dutchman by Brian Jacques, 2001
- Ghost – The Sea Wolf by Jack London, 1904
- The Glen Carrig – The Boats of the "Glen Carrig" by William Hope Hodgson, 1907
- Goblin – We Didn’t Mean to Go to Sea by Arthur Ransome (1937)
- HMS Gorgon – Richard Bolitho, Midshipman, 1978; Midshipman Bolitho and the Avenger, 1978, by Alexander Kent
- HM Hellebore – A Brig of War by Richard Woodman, 1983
- Hispaniola – Treasure Island by Robert Louis Stevenson, 1883
- HMS Hotspur – Hornblower and the Hotspur by C. S. Forester, 1962
- The Ibis Schooner – Sea of Poppies by Amitav Ghosh, 2008
- HMS Indomitable – For My Country's Freedom by Alexander Kent, 1995
- USS Keeling – The Good Shepherd by C. S. Forester, 1955
- HM Kestrel – A Kings Cutter by Richard Woodman, 1982
- La Qualla – Jungle Cruise by Brooke Vitale (2021)
- HMS Leviathan –HMS Leviathan by John Winton, 1967
- USS Levant – The Man Without a Country by Edward Everett Hale, 1863
- Life Boat – Life of Pi by Yann Martel, 2001
- Little Toot – Little Toot by Hardie Gramatky, 1939
- Lorelei Leeto – The Wake of the Lorelei Lee by Louis A. Meyer, 2002
- HMS Lydia – The Happy Return by C. S. Forester, 1937
- Mary Deare – The Wreck of the Mary Deare by Hammond Innes, 1956
- Mongolia – Around the World in Eighty Days by Jules Verne, 1873
- USS Nathan James (DDG-80) –The Last Ship by William Brinkley, 1988
- Nautilus – Twenty Thousand Leagues Under the Seas (1870) and The Mysterious Island (1874) by Jules Verne
- Nellie – Heart of Darkness by Joseph Conrad, 1899
- HMS Nonsuch – The Commodore, 1945, and Lord Hornblower, 1946, by C. S. Forester
- Not for Hire – The Fabulous Riverboat by Philip José Farmer, 1971
- Oregon – Oregon Files by Clive Cussler
- Ossa – Lord Jim by Joseph Conrad, 1900
- HMS Pallas – Captain Monsoon by Victor Suthren, 1993
- HMS Pandora –One of Our Warships by John Winton, 1975
- Patna – Lord Jim by Joseph Conrad, 1900
- HMS Patrician – In Distant Waters, 1988; A Private Revenge, 1989; and The Flying Squadron, 1992, by Richard Woodman
- Pequod – Moby-Dick by Herman Melville, 1851
- HMS Phalarope – To Glory We Steer by Alexander Kent, 1968
- Pharaon – The Count of Monte Cristo by Alexandre Dumas, 1844
- SS Poseidon – The Poseidon Adventure by Paul Gallico, 1969
- Pushkin –The Last Ship by William Brinkley, 1988
- USS Pyramus – The Deep Silence by Douglas Reeman, 1967
- Queequeg – The Grim Grotto by Lemony Snicket, 2004
- Red October – The Hunt for Red October by Tom Clancy, 1984
- The Red Rover – The Red Rover by James Fenimore Cooper, 1827
- USS Reluctant (AK-601) – Mister Roberts by Thomas Heggen, 1946
- HMS Restless – Yashimoto's Last Dive by Antony Trew, 1986
- USS San Pablo – The Sand Pebbles by Richard McKenna, 1962
- Santa Ybel – Secret Sea by Robb White, 1947
- Scuffy – Scuffy the Tugboat by Gertrude Crampton, 1946
- The Sea Witch – The Wreck of the Mary Deare by Hammond Innes, 1956
- HMS Seahorse – Down The Hatch by John Winton, 1962
- USS Shiloh – Flight of the Intruder by Stephen Coonts, 1986
- Slewfoot – Torpedo Run by Robb White, 1962
- Slice of Life – Dexter by Jeff Lindsay
- HMS Sutherland – A Ship of the Line, 1938 by C. S. Forester
- Swallow – Swallows and Amazons by Arthur Ransome, 1930
- HMS Temeraire –The Fighting Temeraire by John Winton, 1971
- HMS Tempest – Passage To Mutiny by Alexander Kent, 1976
- HMS Thunder Child – The War of the Worlds by H. G. Wells
- SS Titan – Futility, or the Wreck of the Titan by Morgan Robertson, 1898
- HM Triton – Ramage and the Freebooters by Dudley Pope, 1969
- Tsimtsum – Life of Pi, 2001
- U-996 – An Operational Necessity by Gwyn Griffin, 1967
- HMS Ulysses – HMS Ulysses, by Alistair MacLean, 1955
- HMS Undine – Command a King's Ship by Alexander Kent, 1973
- HM Virago – The Bomb Vessel by Richard Woodman, 1984
- Vital Spark – The Collected Stories from The Vital Spark by Neil Munro, 1906
- The Walrus –Treasure Island by Robert Louis Stevenson, 1883
- USS Walrus – Run Silent, Run Deep by Edward L. Beach Jr., 1955
- Water-Witch – The Water-Witch by James Fenimore Cooper, 1830
- We're Here – Captains Courageous by Rudyard Kipling, 1897
- White Witch – Tai-Pan by James Clavell, 1966
- HMS Witch of Endor – Flying Colours, 1938 by C. S. Forester
- Wonderful Fanny – Snuff by Terry Pratchett

=== Poetry ===
- Alice May – "The Cremation of Sam McGee" by Robert W. Service, 1907
- Argo – "Argonautica" by Apollonius of Rhodes, 3rd century BCE
- Prydwen – "Preiddeu Annwfn", 14th century

=== Short stories ===
- Marie Celeste – "J. Habakuk Jephson's Statement" by Arthur Conan Doyle, 1884

== Radio ==
- HMS Goliath – Deep Trouble, 2005–2007
- The Scarlet Queen – Voyage of the Scarlet Queen, 1947–1948
- HMS Troutbridge – The Navy Lark, 1959–1976

== Stage ==
- SS American – Anything Goes by Cole Porter, Guy Bolton, P. G. Wodehouse, Howard Lindsay, and Russel Crouse, 1934
- Coronia – Sail Away by Noël Coward, 1961
- Cotton Blossom – Show Boat by Jerome Kern and Oscar Hammerstein II, 1927
- Flying Dutchman – Der fliegende Holländer (The Flying Dutchman) by Richard Wagner, 1843
- SS Hendrik Hudson – Over Night by Philip Bartholomae, 1911
- Hibernia – The Defender by Charles Dennée and Allen Lowe, 1902
- HMS Pinafore – H.M.S. Pinafore by Gilbert and Sullivan, 1878
- The Pirate Queen – The Pirate Queen by Claude-Michel Schönberg, Alain Boublil, Richard Maltby Jr., and John Dempsey; 2006
- USS Reluctant (AK-601) – Mister Roberts by Joshua Logan and Thomas Heggen, 1948
- SS Majestania – The Beauty Prize by Jerome Kern, George Grossmith, and P. G. Wodehouse, 1923
- Mauretania – The Greyhound by Paul Armstrong and Wilson Mizner, 1909
- Zong – The Meaning of Zong by Giles Terera, 2022

== Television ==
- HMAS Ambush – Patrol Boat, 1979–1984
- Argonaut – Sea Hunt, 1958–1961
- USS Appleby – Ensign O'Toole, 1962–1963
- Bárbara de Braganza – High Seas
- Black Pig – Captain Pugwash, 1957–1966
- Charlotte Rhodes – The Onedin Line, 1971–1980
- USS Colorado (SSBN-753) – Last Resort, 2012–2013
- HMAS Defiance – Patrol Boat, 1979–1984
- HMAS Hammersley – Sea Patrol, 2007–2011
- HMS Hero (F42) – Warship, 1973–1978
- Kerberos – 1899
- USS Kiwi – The Wackiest Ship in the Army, 1965–1966
- S. S. Minnow – Gilligan's Island, 1964–1967; Rescue from Gilligan's Island, 1978
- Nautilus – The Return of Captain Nemo, 1978, and Nautilus, 2024
- USS Nathan James (DDG-151) – The Last Ship, 2014– 2018
- Persephone – The Beachcombers, 1972–1990
- Prometheus – 1899
- PT-73 – McHale's Navy, 1962–1966
- USS Reluctant (AK-601) – Mister Roberts, 1965–1966
- St. Vitus Dance – Miami Vice, 1984–1990
- seaQuest DSV 4600 – seaQuest DSV, 1993–1996
- USS Sea Tiger – Operation Petticoat, 1977–1979
- USOS Seaview – Voyage to the Bottom of the Sea, 1964–1968
- USS Shackleton (DDG-162) –The Last Ship, 2016
- Soren Larsen – The Onedin Line
- Stingray – Stingray, 1964–1965
- Terrorfish – Stingray, 1964–1965
- Theodore – Theodore Tugboat, 1993–2001
- Thunderbird 4 – Thunderbirds, 1964
- Tiki III – Adventures in Paradise, 1959–1962
- SS Tipton – The Suite Life on Deck
- Toot – Toot the Tiny Tugboat, 2014–2015
- Vast Explorer – Adventure Inc., 2002–2003
- USS Wayne – Assault on the Wayne, 1971
- X-2 – hydrofoil in The Venture Bros.
- Zuko's Fire Nation ship – Avatar: The Last Airbender

== Video games ==
- Jackdaw – Assassin's Creed IV: Black Flag
- King of Red Lions – The Legend of Zelda
- The Maw – Little Nightmares
- Outer Gear – Metal Gear Solid 4: Guns of the Patriots

== See also ==
- Flying submarine
- Submarine films
- List of fictional spacecraft
- List of fictional vehicles
- List of underwater science fiction works
