= Leander-class cruiser (1931) =

UK class of light cruisers

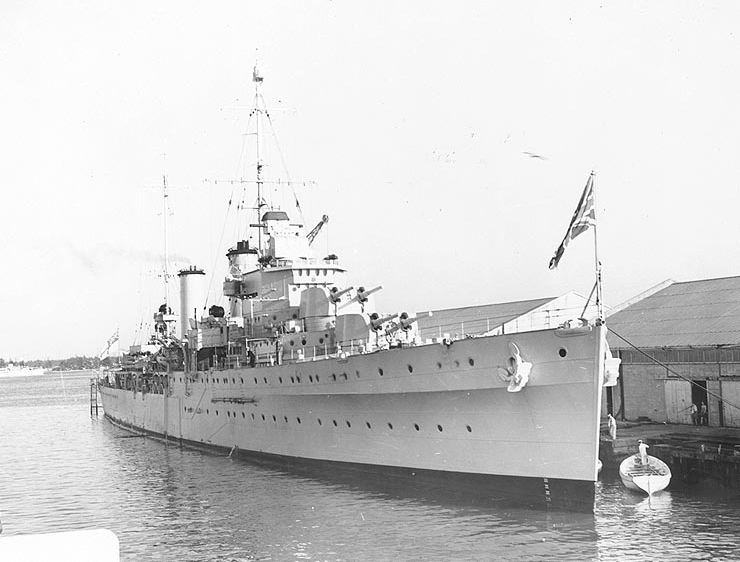
- HMS Apollo in 1938 at Miami, Florida prior to transfer to Royal Australian Navy

Class overview
- Name: Leander class
- Builders: Devonport Dockyard (3); Portsmouth Dockyard (2); Cammell Laird (1); Swan Hunter (1); Vickers-Armstrongs (1)
- Operators: Royal Navy; Royal Australian Navy; Royal New Zealand Navy; Indian Navy
- Preceded by: Emerald class
- Succeeded by: Arethusa class
- Subclasses: Leander; Amphion / Perth
- In commission: 1933–1948 (Royal Navy); 1935–1947 (Royal Australian Navy); 1937–1946 (Royal NZ Navy); 1948–1978 (Indian Navy)
- Completed: 8
- Lost: 3

General characteristics (as-built)
- Type: Light cruiser
- Displacement: 7,270 long tons (7,390 t) (standard); 9,740 long tons (9,900 t) (full load) (9,000 long tons (9,100 t) in Amphions)
- Length: 554.9 ft (169.1 m)
- Beam: 56 ft (17.1 m)
- Draught: 19.1 ft (5.8 m)
- Installed power: 6 × (Leander) or 4 × (Amphion) Admiralty 3-drum boilers; 72,000 shp (54,000 kW)
- Propulsion: 4 shafts; 4 geared steam turbines
- Speed: 32.5 knots (60.2 km/h; 37.4 mph)
- Range: 5,730 nmi (10,610 km; 6,590 mi) at 13 knots (24 km/h; 15 mph)
- Complement: 570
- Armament: 4 × twin BL 6 in (152 mm) guns; 4 × single QF 4 in (102 mm) guns; 3 × quadruple 0.5 in (12.7 mm) AA machineguns; 2 × quadruple 21 in (533 mm) torpedo tubes
- Armour: Magazine: 3 in (76 mm) box; Deck: 1 in (25 mm); Gun turrets: 1 in (25 mm)
- Aircraft carried: 1 × seaplane
- Aviation facilities: 1 × catapult & crane

The Leander class was a class of eight light cruisers built for the Royal Navy in the early 1930s that saw service in World War II. They were named after mythological figures, and all ships were commissioned between 1933 and 1936. The three ships of the second group were sold to the Royal Australian Navy (RAN) before World War II and renamed after Australian cities.

== Design ==
The design was led by Charles Lillicrap of the Royal Corps of Naval Constructors. The Leander class was influenced by his York-class heavy cruiser and was an attempt to better provide for the role of commerce protection. The 7,000-7,200 ton Leanders were armed with eight BL 6 inch Mk XXIII naval guns in twin turrets, two forward and two aft. Their secondary armament consisted of four high-angle QF 4 inch Mk V naval guns, which were later replaced by twin mountings for eight guns (the later high angle QF 4 inch Mk XVI naval gun). Their close-range anti-aircraft weaponry consisted of twelve 0.5-inch (13 mm) Vickers machine guns in three quadruple mounts. They also shipped a bank of four 21-inch (530 mm) torpedo tubes on each beam and provision was made in the design for the carriage of two catapult-launched Fairey Seafox aircraft.

Speed was 32 knots (59.3 km/h; 36.8 mph), and 845 tons of armour was provided. During trials in December 1932 Leander made 32.45 knots (60.1 km/h; 37.3 mph) with 72,430 shaft horsepower (54,010 kW) at 7265 tons displacement and 31.4 knots (58.2 km/h; 36.1 mph) with 73,140 shp (54,540 kW) at 9010 tons deep displacement. The first five vessels did not contain dispersed machinery; the boiler rooms were arranged together and exhausted into a single funnel, a unique feature amongst British cruisers. This meant that damage amidships was more liable to disable all the boiler rooms. In service their machinery proved to be highly reliable and exceeded trials output by a wide margin as evidenced by Achilles on 13 December 1939 during The Battle of the River Plate:

The main engines of the Achilles, it was recorded, ‘were manoeuvred with far greater rapidity than would have been attempted under any conditions but those of emergency. All demands on the machinery were met more than adequately, all material standing up to the strain in such a manner that nothing but confidence was felt during the action. … The behaviour of both men and machinery left nothing to be desired. When all the machinery of the Achilles had worked up to full power, readings gave a total of almost exactly 82,000 horse-power, with the four propellers turning at an average of 283 revolutions a minute.’ This tribute to the soundness of design and the excellence of British shipyard workmanship is underlined by the statement of Captain Woodhouse of the Ajax that steam had been shut off the main engines of his ship for only five days since 26 August 1939.

=== Wartime modifications ===
During the war, significant modifications were made to the vessels. Various additional anti-aircraft armament was added, and the two New Zealand vessels removed a turret to carry heavier 20 mm and 40 mm anti-aircraft guns in its place. Changes to the aircraft launching capability were reported, although use is unclear.

== Ships in class ==
Construction data for Leander group
Name	Pennant	Namesake	Builder	Ordered	Laid down	Launched	Commissioned	Fate
Leander	75	Leander of Abydos	HM Dockyard, Devonport	18 February 1930	8 September 1930	24 September 1931	24 March 1933	Transferred to Royal New Zealand Navy as HMNZS Leander, 1941–1945; Broken up at Blyth, 1950
Orion	85	Orion the Hunter	HM Dockyard, Devonport	24 March 1931	26 September 1931	24 November 1932	18 January 1934	Broken up at Dalmuir, 1949
Neptune	20	Neptune, God of the Sea	HM Dockyard, Portsmouth	2 March 1931	24 September 1931	31 January 1933	23 February 1934	Sunk in minefield off Tripoli, 19 December 1941
Ajax	22	Ajax the Great	Vickers Armstrong, Barrow-in-Furness	1 October 1932	7 February 1933	1 March 1934	12 April 1935	Broken up at Newport, 1949
Achilles	70	Achilles	Cammell Laird, Birkenhead	16 February 1931	11 June 1931	1 September 1932	10 October 1933	Transferred to Royal New Zealand Navy as HMNZS Achilles, 1941–1946; Sold to Indian Navy as HIMS Delhi, 1948

Construction data for Amphion group
Name	Pennant	Namesake	Builder	Ordered	Laid down	Launched	Commissioned	Fate
Perth (ex-Amphion)	29	Amphion of Thebes	HM Dockyard, Portsmouth	1 December 1932	22 June 1933	27 July 1934	15 June 1936	Sold to Royal Australian Navy as HMAS Perth, 1939; Sunk in torpedo attack, 1 March 1942
Hobart (ex-Apollo)	63	Apollo, God of Light	HM Dockyard, Devonport	1 March 1933	15 August 1933	9 October 1934	13 January 1936	Sold to Royal Australian Navy as HMAS Hobart, 1938; Broken up at Osaka, 1962
Sydney (ex-Phaeton)	48	City of Sydney; Phaeton, son of Helios	Swan Hunter, Wallsend	10 February 1933	8 July 1933	22 September 1934	24 September 1935	Sunk in surface action, 19 November 1941 with all hands

=== Leander group ===
- Leander

Loaned to New Zealand, commissioned as HMNZS Leander in September 1941. At the Battle of Kolombangara, Leander was heavily damaged by a Long Lance torpedo, causing many casualties, and sending the ship to repairs for two years.

- Achilles, later HMIS/INS Delhi.

Achilles was the second vessel loaned to New Zealand, commissioned as HMNZS Achilles in September 1941. She had earlier participated in the Battle of the River Plate. Achilles was sold to India in 1948, and was known as HMIS Delhi for a few years, then served as INS Delhi, until 1978.

- Ajax

Ajax participated in the Battle of the River Plate. The town of Ajax, Ontario was named after the ship, with street names in the town named after members of the crew. Ajax also participated in the Battle of Cape Matapan and took part in shelling the mainland of Normandy during the beach landings. Chile wanted to buy HMS Ajax in 1948–9, but the opposition leader in the UK, Winston Churchill thought the ship should be retained for the RN and it became a political issue. The Leander class cruisers were very well built in the early 1930s and in the case of Achilles proved capable of more than 40 years service. After the rest of the class, including HMS Ajax, were scrapped, there was regret in the RN, because in many ways with their long 12,000-mile range and generous hull they were ideal for use as ocean radar pickets.

- Neptune

Manned by New Zealand crew, although not part of the Royal New Zealand Navy. Neptune was sunk by an Italian mine off the coast of Tripoli.

- Orion

Orion spent much of the early war in the Mediterranean providing escort to convoys and was also at the Battle of Cape Matapan in March 1941. She participated in the evacuation of Crete in 1941 and was heavily damaged. Orion's repairs were completed in March 1942, after which she was widely employed, in home waters and on convoy escort duties to Africa and the Indian Ocean. Orion returned to the Mediterranean in October 1942 and was involved in convoy escort duties and supported the army in the invasion of Sicily. She also took part in the Normandy Landings in June 1944, where she fired the first shell. Orion received 13 battle honours, a record only exceeded by HMS Warspite and matched by two others.

=== Modified Leander group ===
The last three ships of the class, referred to as the "Modified Leander", "Amphion", or "Perth" class, had their machinery and propulsion equipment organised in two self-contained units (separated fore and aft), allowing the ship to continue operating if one set was damaged. The two exhaust funnels, one for each machinery space, gave the modified ships a different profile from the early Leanders, which had a single funnel. To cover the separate machinery spaces, the side armour was extended from 84 to 141 feet (26 to 43 m), negating the weight reduction created by the separation. During design, it was planned to modify the forward-most and aft-most 6-inch turrets to be fitted with three guns instead of two, but the plan was cancelled when it was determined that the required alterations would cause several negative side effects, including reducing the ship's top speed and causing problems with effective fire control. All three ships were sold to the RAN, Sydney while under construction and Perth and Hobart after a few years of British service.

- Perth (ex-Amphion)

Completed 1936 as HMS Amphion and transferred to the RAN as HMAS Perth in 1939. She operated with British ships in the Battle of the Mediterranean, participating in the Battle of Cape Matapan in March 1941. Lost in the Battle of Sunda Strait in early 1942.

- Hobart (ex-Apollo)

Completed 1936 as HMS Apollo and transferred to the RAN in 1938 as HMAS Hobart, she took part in the East African Campaign, the Battle of the Coral Sea and provided fire support at Guadalcanal. After being badly damaged by a torpedo strike in 1943, she returned to action in the Philippines landings (1944), followed by the Borneo and Aitape-Wewak campaigns. She was put into reserve after the war and was not decommissioned until 1962.

- Sydney (ex-Phaeton)

Laid down as HMS Phaeton, the ship was acquired by the RAN, launched as HMAS Sydney and was commissioned in 1935. Also involved in the Mediterranean campaign. Sydney sank the Italian cruiser Bartolomeo Colleoni at the Battle of Cape Spada in 1940. Later that year, Sydney took part in the Battle of Cape Matapan and Battle of Calabria, participating in the sinking of the Italian destroyer, the Espero. In 1941, off Western Australia, Sydney encountered the German auxiliary cruiser Kormoran; the two ships destroyed each other and Sydney was lost with all hands; the wrecks of both ships were located in 2008.

== In fiction ==
Warren Tute's novel The Cruiser features HMS Antigone, a Leander-class cruiser with a striking similarity to Ajax.

Douglas Reeman's novel A Ship Must Die is set aboard the titular fictional Leander-class cruiser Andromeda pitted against a German surface raider operating in the Indian Ocean.
