= Flight of the Intruder (video game) =

1990 video game

- Home computer cover art
- Developers: Rowan Software; Imagineering (NES)
- Publishers: Spectrum HoloByte; Mindscape (NES)
- Platforms: MS-DOS, Amiga, Atari ST, NES
- Release: 1990: MS-DOS, Amiga, ST; 1991: NES
- Genre: Flight simulation
- Mode: Single-player

Flight of the Intruder is a flight simulation video game developed by Rowan Software and published by Spectrum HoloByte in 1990 for MS-DOS, Amiga, and Atari ST. A conversion to the Nintendo Entertainment System by Imagineering was published by Mindscape in 1991. The game is based on the novel of the same name and received as the successor of the first game of the Falcon video game series.

== Gameplay ==
This combat flight simulator allows players the choice of flying either the Grumman A-6 Intruder or the McDonnell Douglas F-4 Phantom II from aircraft carriers against targets in North Vietnam. Players are challenged both by the comprehensive enemy defenses and the restrictive and complex rules of engagement of the period. Realistic features include unreliable missiles and smokey engines for the Phantom (as in real life, the trail would disappear in afterburner). At lower realism settings, the F-4 has an internal cannon in addition to the missiles, in contrast to real USN F-4's that were armed only with missiles. A wide range of mission types is available, from simple bomb runs or combat air patrols to SEAD missions requiring close cooperation between the call signs involved. The player can plan each mission in detail. Based on the given number of planes in their flight, they are able to choose from various armament options for each plane. A mission editor allows for changes in waypoints and also how friendly AI is supposed to behave in each phase of the mission. There is also the option to use a default loadout and keep the waypoints unchanged.

In flight, the player is allowed to switch between the planes at will, taking control over the respective airplane or leave the AI flying and just spectate. The game also comes with a fast-forward feature, e.g., to shorten the waiting time for the transit leg from the aircraft carrier and back, which is slowed to normal time progression if there is a hostile plane in visual range. The aircraft cockpits, especially the different modes and settings of radar and targeting systems, as well as flight controls are complex. The game offers different levels of realism and difficulty and a manual giving background stories quoting real life pilots of the era. Carrier landings can be left to the AI or flown manually, the latter requiring the player to maintain the aircraft in a very small envelope to safely land, increasing the difficulty of completing a mission.

== Plot ==
The game is loosely based on the novel Flight of the Intruder by Stephen Coonts. The player flies several missions off one of the aircraft carriers on Yankee Station. The game does not have a real story line but instead is set in the historic conflict of the Vietnam war. In campaign mode the player progresses through the different air campaigns of the Vietnam war, with the first mission being the notorious Tonkin Gulf incident, the casus belli escalating the conflict.

== Reception ==
The game was received as a successor to the first game of the Falcon series, but was never as successful or prominent as the latter. Computer Gaming World in 1990 stated that the player controlling wingmen distinguished the game from other flight simulators, and favorably reviewed the flight models and other realistic features. The magazine concluded that the game "is a tour de force in simulation programming ... for the moment, at least, Flight of the Intruder is the king of the flight simulations". A 1992 survey in the magazine of wargames with modern settings gave the game three and a half stars out of five, and a 1994 survey gave it three stars.

== See also ==
- Turn and Burn: The F-14 Dogfight Simulator
