= The Forth Road Bridge =

1965 British documentary film by Gordon Lang

- Opening titles
- Directed by: Gordon Lang
- Written by: Vincent Mulchrone; Warren Tute
- Produced by: Peter Mills
- Narrated by: Alec Clunes
- Edited by: Edward Bond; Christine Garner; Cy Roth
- Production company: Random Productions
- Distributed by: Films of Scotland and Shell-Mex and BP
- Release date: 1965
- Running time: 55 minutes
- Country: United Kingdom
- Language: English

The Forth Road Bridge is a 1965 British documentary film directed by Gordon Lang, about the Forth Road Bridge. Warren Tute wrote the treatment, with Vincent Mulchrone writing the commentary which is read by Alec Clunes.

It was nominated for an Academy Award for Best Documentary Feature.
