= Flight of the Intruder (novel) =

1986 novel by Stephen Coonts

- First edition
- Author: Stephen Coonts
- Language: English
- Genre: Techno-thriller novel
- Publisher: Naval Institute Press
- Publication place: United States
- Media type: Print (hardback & paperback)
- ISBN: 0-87021-200-1
- Followed by: Final Flight

Flight of the Intruder is a novel written by Stephen Coonts in 1986, telling the stories of United States Navy aviators flying the A-6 Intruder – a two-man, all-weather, aircraft carrier-based strike aircraft on missions during the Vietnam War. The main character is Jake "Cool Hand" Grafton, a naval aviator who appears in a series of sequels. The book, which was made into a film of the same name and adapted into a video game, marked the beginning of Stephen Coonts' career as a best-selling novelist.

== Plot summary ==
Flight of the Intruder begins with a night attack mission flown by Jake Grafton and his navigator Morgan "Morg" McPherson from the USN aircraft carrier, USS Shiloh, striking a target in North Vietnam. Although there are many militarily valuable targets in North Vietnam, Grafton and other aviators are instead routinely ordered to hit worthless targets—typically "suspected truck parks". The pilots are barred from hitting the more valuable targets because of restrictive "rules of engagement" imposed on American forces. Despite the minimal damage even a successful strike will inflict on the enemy (whom the aviators refer to as "Gomers"), North Vietnamese airspace is heavily defended, making the missions extremely dangerous for the aviators. Grafton and Morg elude most of the defenses, but a stray shot fired by a lone farmer on the ground fatally wounds Morg.

Traumatized by the loss of his good friend, Grafton begins to question whether his efforts have been worth it. He is eventually paired up with Virgil 'Tiger' Cole as his new navigator. Cole, an aggressive veteran with experience over the most heavily defended areas of North Vietnam, becomes aware of Grafton's frustrations, and the two begin to plan an unauthorized mission against a Communist Party center in Hanoi, which will be a serious violation of the restrictive rules of engagement. With the help of one of the Shiloh's intelligence officers, Cole and Grafton locate and plan the mission. Flying the mission nearly proves fatal due to problems with the A-6's weapons system. Once completed, they don't even know if they successfully hit anything.

Grafton's superiors soon learn of the unauthorized strike—there is no way to hide the fact that Grafton's plane was shot at by surface to air missiles, yet no SAM sites were positioned near the target they were supposed to hit.

Both Grafton and Cole are prosecuted by the Navy, with a conviction being certain. The charges are dropped however, as the Richard Nixon administration is about to authorize a massive new air war campaign against Hanoi, "Linebacker II". The Navy decides that they can't prosecute pilots for flying a mission against Hanoi when the President is about to order an escalation along the same lines.

The remainder of the novel follows Grafton's exploits in what became known as The Christmas Bombings. He also romances Callie, his future wife. He is shot down during the offensive, and is forced to confront the horror of war on the ground, and the story closes with Grafton being rescued.

== Characters ==
- Jake "Cool Hand" Grafton: Naval aviator and the protagonist.
- Virgil "Tiger" Cole: An experienced aviator. He has flown in missions over Hanoi at least twice, and his favorite missions are those against missile sites.
- Commander Frank Camparelli: The commanding officer of Grafton's A-6 squadron.
- "Cowboy" is a naval aviator. A man of few words, Cowboy's persona hides a man of above average intelligence.
- Morgan "Morg" McPherson: Grafton's navigator and close friend.
- Callie is Grafton's love interest. They meet when Grafton tours Hong Kong.
- "Rabbit" Wilson: A naval aviator with seniority over Grafton, but hobbled by his fear of night flying, which has led to his being mocked by other pilots. Wilson avoids many night missions by "finding" technical faults with his assigned aircraft. Eventually, his "downing" of a night mission aircraft comes to the attention of superior officers. His fate is never specified, though it is presumed that he is removed from flying status.

== Aircraft appearing or mentioned ==
- The Grumman A-6 Intruder is a two-man, twin-engine bomber flown from aircraft carriers. The Intruder uses sophisticated electronics to find and attack targets in bad weather and/or at night, though the equipment often proves unreliable. The Intruder also lacks any defensive weapons against fighters.
- The McDonnell Douglas F-4 Phantom II, also a two-man, twin-engine warplane flown from USN aircraft carriers. It lacks the sophisticated ground attack capability of the Intruder, but is also more capable than that plane against enemy fighters. An enemy pursuing Grafton is driven off by a Phantom.
- The Vought A-7 Corsair II is a simple, one-man, carrier-borne, ground-attack aircraft. Grafton compares his own Intruder to the Corsair, wishing the Intruder were armed with an internal gun like the Corsair was.
- Mikoyan-Gurevich MiG-19 Farmer, a twin-engine, supersonic interceptor flown by the air force of North Vietnam. In one mission, Grafton is tasked to attack a group of MiG-19's on the ground. The MiG-19 is derided as a day fighter that would be "mincemeat" if caught in the air by Phantoms.
- Douglas A-1 Skyraider, (formerly known as AD Skyraider) is an American single-seat attack aircraft that saw service between the late 1940s and early 1980s. The Skyraider had a remarkably long and successful career; it became a piston-powered, propeller-driven anachronism in the jet age, and was nicknamed "Spad", after the French World War I fighter. It was a pivotal aircraft for helicopter rescue supporter as it could loiter over the objectives for many hours, much longer than jet aircraft of the day.

== Video game ==
Flight of the Intruder, a video game based on the novel, was released for personal computers in 1990 and re-released for the Nintendo Entertainment System around the same time as the film adaptation. Certain boxed copies of the personal computer versions included a copy of the novel as well. Developed by Rowan Software, Ltd. and published by Spectrum Holobyte, the game allowed players the choice of flying either the A-6 intruder or the F-4 from aircraft carriers against targets in the Democratic Republic of Vietnam. Players were challenged both by the comprehensive enemy defenses and the restrictive and complex rules of engagement. Realistic features included unreliable missiles and smokey engines for the Phantom (as in real life, the trail would disappear in afterburner). At lower realism settings, F-4's had missiles and an internal cannon - in contrast to real USN whose F-4's were armed only with missiles.

== Sequels ==
Flight of the Intruder lays the groundwork for other Stephen Coonts novels. The Intruders details Grafton's flying in the immediate aftermath of the Vietnam War, and Final Flight (written before the other sequels) shows Grafton as CAG of an aircraft carrier boarded by terrorists. In other books, the character of Jake Grafton eventually continues serving the USN into the 1990s, following the collapse of the Soviet Union and Desert Storm.

Eventually, he finds himself serving as an assistant to the Joint Chiefs, and is last heard from in the book The Disciple, working for the CIA (by this time in his late 50s to early 60s).
