= We Joined the Navy =

1962 British film by Wendy Toye

- Directed by: Wendy Toye
- Written by: Howard Dimsdale
- Based on: We Joined the Navy by John Winton
- Produced by: Daniel M. Angel; Vivian Cox
- Starring: Kenneth More; Lloyd Nolan; Joan O'Brien
- Cinematography: Otto Heller
- Edited by: Richard Best
- Music by: Ron Grainer
- Production companies: Angel Productions; Associated British Picture Corporation
- Distributed by: Warner-Pathé Distributors
- Release date: 29 November 1962 (London)
- Running time: 106 minutes
- Country: United Kingdom
- Language: English

We Joined the Navy (also known as Ankles Away) is a 1962 British comedy film directed by Wendy Toye and starring Kenneth More, Lloyd Nolan, Joan O'Brien, Derek Fowlds, Graham Crowden, Esma Cannon and John Le Mesurier. Produced by Daniel M. Angel, it was written by Howard Dimsdale (as Arthur Dales) based on the 1959 novel of the same name by John Winton, a former Royal Navy lieutenant commander.

In addition to the credited cast, the film features uncredited cameos by Michael Bentine, Sidney James, Rodney Bewes and Dirk Bogarde.

Director Wendy Toye said "it was a fun film to do it really was, because it is always lovely to work with Kenny More, it always was. And Lloyd Nolan was such an excellent actor."

== Plot ==
Lieutenant Commander Robert Bollinger Badger, known everywhere in the Royal Navy as The Artful Bodger, is an excellent naval officer with one major problem: he speaks the truth at the most inopportune times. As a result, he is transferred to shore duty and then to instruct at the Royal Naval College. When his remarks are repeated by one of his students to the student's father, an anti-military member of Parliament, Badger has one last chance: he and three problem midshipmen are sent as exchange officers to the flagship of the United States Sixth Fleet. Their antics set back Anglo-American relations until they go ashore to a nation in the midst of a revolution.

== Cast ==
- Kenneth More as Lieutenant Commander Robert Badger
- Lloyd Nolan as Vice Admiral Ryan
- Joan O'Brien as Lieutenant Carol Blair
- Mischa Auer as Colonel & President
- Jeremy Lloyd as Dewberry Jr.
- Dinsdale Landen as Bowles
- Derek Fowlds as Carson
- Denise Warren as Collette
- John Le Mesurier as George Dewberry Sr.
- Lally Bowers as Cynthia Dewberry, his wife
- Laurence Naismith as Admiral Blake
- Andrew Cruickshank as Admiral Filmer
- Walter Fitzgerald as Admiral Thomas
- John Phillips as Rear Admiral
- Ronald Leigh-Hunt as Commander Royal Navy
- Arthur Lovegrove as Chief Petty Officer Froud
- Brian Wilde as Petty Officer Gibbons
- David Warner as sailor painting ship
- John Barrard as Consul
- Esma Cannon as Consul's wife
- Sean Kelly as Sinjett
- Marie France as Francoise
- Alexis Kanner as Gerrit
- Warren Mitchell as 'Honest' Marcel
- Kenneth Griffith as orator
- Neil McCarthy as the Sergeant
- Tutte Lemkow as the Corporal
- Dirk Bogarde as Dr Simon Sparrow (from original Doctor in the House film)
- Sid James as dance instructor
- Michael Bentine as psychologist
- Graham Crowden as naval officer
- Guy Standeven as American naval officer
- Andrew Sachs as US seaman
- Rodney Bewes as recruitment interviewee
- Richard Vernon as government official
- Wanda Ventham as Dartmouth girl

== Production ==
The 1959 novel of the same name was written by John Winton, a pseudonym for Royal Navy Lieutenant Commander John Pratt. He based the character of Robert Badger on Captain John Ronald Gower, whom he had served under in the Royal Navy. In early 1959, producer Daniel Angel bought the film rights as a vehicle for Kenneth More.

Angel was blacklisted by cinema chains in England for two years for selling his films to television. We Joined the Navy was his comeback film. "They held out longer than I thought they would," said Angel. "The reasons for the unbanning are unspecified. I was just made to understand that if I produced films, the exhibitors would consider showing them."

In 1961 Daniel Angel signed a deal to produce a number of movies for Associated British of which this was to be the first (West 11 was the second).

More made it after his attempts to star in a film based on the book White Rabbit fell through. He called We Joined the Navy "the funniest script I've ever read" and said "it will be the I'm Alright Jack of the navy."

Toyes said Dirk Bogarde did a cameo as a favour to More and Danny Angel. "He was wonderful," said the director. "He came down, he only had had one very short scene to do, there were lots and lots of little cameo parts. And he never put a foot wrong, never had to have another tape, just came in and did it and had gone in about half an hour."

Filming started on 1 May 1962 on location in Villefranche-sur-Mer, near Nice and Monaco, on board the Royal Naval College, Dartmouth, and USS Springfield as well as at ABPC Elstree Studios.

The film's sets were designed by art director John Howell. It was shot in CinemaScope by cinematographer Otto Heller.

It was Mischa Auer's first English language film in a number of years.

Toye later said "the first half" of the film with "the boys being at Dartmouth and then being accepted for the navy and taking their various jobs and being, they became the three midshipmen... all that worked splendidly." However she said in the second half "it all took a funny turn and it became a bit political and by that time the mood of the film was comedy and it just, I don’t think it worked really. But it was the most fantastic cast."

== Reception ==
The Monthly Film Bulletin wrote: "Opening with a couple of acid scenes guying Naval procedure when a junior officer proves a superior wrong, and a genuinely witty sequence of a selection board for Dartmouth cadets, We Joined the Navy settles down comfortably to routine farce. At moments of desperation, a guest star is introduced for easy laughs (Kenneth More, visiting his nurse, is told that an English doctor at the hospital is anxious to see him; who else but Dirk Bogarde, his door helpfully labelled "Dr. Simon Sparrow"?). Neither of the two main comic set-pieces works very well: the Moronia revolution sequences are overlong and painfully unfunny, while the striptease which Dewberry organises as entertainments officer, and which lands him in trouble with the admiral, is not only dull but mild enough for the U-est of U certificates. Most of the acting, though, is skilfully and amiably amusing, especially Derek Fowlds' pottrait of an intellect-and seasick-prone midshipman."

Variety wrote: "As inconsequential as its title, this lighthearted frolic provides an easygoing vehicle for the charm and comedy knowhow of Kenneth More. His popularity alone should insure ready patrons for a piece of pleasantly mounted frivol which makes the minimum assault on the brain. Casting of dependable Lloyd Nolan, Joan O'Brien and vet Mischa Auer (in a dual role) plus three new young male faces, adds useful support to More's smooth endeavors. Wendy Toye, one of Britain's few women directors, has helmed the pic with brisk gaiety but Arthur Dales' screenplay never adds up to a really cohesive yarn."

The Guardian called it "a good romp".

Filmink argued the film "was lopsided: the action should focus on the new recruits but they have to share time with Kenneth More, who plays their officer."

== Home media ==
A Region 2 DVD of We Joined the Navy was released by Network on 16 February 2015. The disc features a 2.35:1 anamorphic transfer.
