= Under Siege (novel) =

1990 novel by Stephen Coonts

First edition (publ. Pocket Books)

Under Siege is a 1990 novel by Stephen Coonts.

== Plot ==
A drug cartel chief is captured and brought to Washington, DC for trial. The cartel tries various tactics to avenge him, including portable anti-air missiles, snipers, bomb trucks, and suicide squads armed with sub-machine guns.

Grafton is now a member of a joint service team that plans military aid for anti-drug campaigns. He is assigned to a local National Guard unit to battle the cartel in Washington DC. The president is shot down in his helicopter. Snipers shoot a senator, the chief judge of the Supreme Court, and the attorney general. Local drug dealers use the opportunity to battle among themselves with grenade launchers.

The Army, National Guard, police, FBI, and Secret Service hunt the assassins. The cartel strikes back at a National Guard armory. Washington DC's population, fed up with drugs, rally and lynch hundreds of addicts.

== Characters ==
- Jake Grafton - U.S. Navy Captain, former pilot, Medal of Honor recipient, and main character
- Lieutenant "Toad" Tarkington - on shore duty and Grafton's aide
- Lieutenant Rita Moreno - U.S. Navy test pilot and love interest of Lt. Tarkington
- Jack Yocke - Washington Post reporter
- Chano Aldana - Colombian drug kingpin, on trial in Washington DC
- Thanos Liarakos - defense attorney for Chano Aldana
- Henry Charon - New Mexico hunting guide and assassin
- Freeman McNally - major Washington DC crack cocaine dealer
- T Jefferson Brody - attorney for Freeman McNally
- Harrison Ronald Ford (aka "Sammy Z") - undercover anti-drug FBI agent in the employ of Freeman McNally
- George H. W. Bush - himself
- Dan Quayle - himself

== Reception ==
Kirkus Reviews found the novel to be "pessimistic", with an "implausible end", and noted that Coonts' characters are "more comfortable and convincing in the air than in the streets of Washington and the corridors of power".
