= Journey Ahead =

1947 film

- Directed by: Peter Mills
- Screenplay by: Warren Tute
- Production company: Random Film Productions
- Release date: 1947
- Running time: 64 minutes
- Country: United Kingdom
- Language: English

Journey Ahead is a 1947 British second feature ('B') film directed by Peter Mills and starring Nora Gordon, John Stevens, Howard Douglas and Ruth Haven. It was written by Warren Tute.

== Plot ==
Brothers Mike and Adam Baxter spedn their time on a boat belonging to the late husband of landlady Mrs Deacon. Mike falls in love with her convalescing houseguest Ann Franklin, a young war widow who begins to suspect that Mike and Adam are smugglers. They turn out, however, to be government agents.

== Cast ==
- Nora Gordon as Mrs. Deacon
- Ruth Haven as Ann Franklin
- John Stevens as Mike Baxter
- Howard Douglas as Adam Baxter

== Reception ==
The Monthly Film Bulletin wrote: "Made on modest lines, amidst picturesque scenery, the film is refreshingly free from studio artificialities. Local colour is ably supplied by Nora Gordon as the homely Mrs. Deacon and Howard Douglas as her Customs officer beau. Ruth Haven and John Stevens are pleasantly natural as Ann and Mike."

Kine Weekly wrote: "Unpretentious yet picturesquely mounted adventure melodrama. ... Ruth Haven is an engaging and appealing, though slightly 'refeened,' Ann, and John Stevens, also a little 'tony,' is adequate as Mike. The support is sound. The staging is obviously authentic and it is the impressive scenery as much as its modern swashbuckling that keeps the film's end up. A modest diamond in the rough, it should prove acceptable to the majority of picturegoers."

In British Sound Films: The Studio Years 1928–1959 David Quinlan rated the film as "average", writing: "Modest drama with refreshing settings."
