= Badge of Glory =

1982 novel by Douglas Reeman

- First edition
- Author: Douglas Reeman
- Language: English
- Publisher: Hutchinson
- Publication date: 1982
- Publication place: United Kingdom
- Media type: Print (hardback & paperback)
- Pages: 366
- ISBN: 0091504708

Badge of Glory is a nautical historical novel by Douglas Reeman. It forms the initial part of the multi-volume Blackwood saga. which follows the adventures of several generations of Royal Marine officers over 150 years.

== Plot ==
The year is 1850 and a young Queen Victoria is on the throne. Philip Blackwood, a captain in the Royal Marines, and son and grandson of marine officers, rejoins his ship, HMS Audacious, which is to sail to West Africa to help stamp out the remains of the slave trade. The ship is part of a squadron commanded by Vice-Admiral Sir James Ashley-Chute. Blackwood’s younger step-brother Harry, a marine second lieutenant, is also aboard, as is Sir Geoffrey Slade, a senior government official.

At Gibraltar, disquieting news reaches Slade by despatch-boat concerning a possible native uprising north of Freetown. Slade needs to proceed as quickly as possible to investigate. He and a detachment of marines transfer to HMS Satyr, a new and faster steam ship, of the type being newly constructed for the Royal Navy; admired by some but derided by others including Ashley-Chute.

After coaling at Tenerife, they arrive in the Bight of Benin. Following the marines dictum of ‘First to Land-Last to Leave’, Blackwood lands a detachment of marines. They find themselves facing a superior force of natives, led by King Mdlaka. They are clearly trained and armed by white slavers. Despite the British government’s attempts to persuade the natives to take up palm oil production, they have returned to the vastly more lucrative slave trade. Many marines are killed and wounded in the battle, but they are able to relieve the besieged trade fortress, finding few survivors.

Major Rupert Fynmore takes command for the next landing, and further battles take place with the well-entrenched slavers. They are well-armed with cannon and newer rifle-bored weapons that the marines have not yet been issued with. Blackwood is badly wounded and evacuated to ship, initially to Freetown and then back to England. But the hard-fighting marines are victorious, and Lessard, the leader of the slavers, falls, or is pushed, into the hold of a laden slave ship, where he’s torn apart. Slade’s niece, Davern Seymour, who Blackwood had met in Portsmouth and is fascinated with, is also rescued. She had been captured and ill-treated by the slavers. Her father, a doctor, has been horribly killed.

Blackwood’s recovery is slow. His domineering step-mother insists that he will recover better at the family home of Hawks Hill. and he is taken there, with his faithful valet, Private Smithett. He finds his father, the Colonel, bedridden but in good spirits and happy to hear of his son’s exploits.

Blackwood decides to leave home and stay at his club. He accidentally overhears a conversation in which he learns that his step-mother was the mistress of the late Lord Lapidge, from whom she inherited her wealth. He reports for duty in Portsmouth.

The marines are posted to Malta, where Blackwood finds the climate even more stifling than that of West Africa. They spend most of their time on ceremonial duties and drilling with new weapons. Harry Blackwood has an affair with Fynmore’s young wife. Then under Ashley-Chute’s command, they sail for the Black Sea to participate in the Crimean War.

From the port of Varna, the squadron joins battle with Russian ships off the coast near Odessa. The flagship, HMS Tenacious, is almost overwhelmed, but Blackwood’s marine sharpshooters manage to save the day. Ashley-Chute is killed in the battle.

The marines are ordered to Crimea and land at Balaclava. They march inland, where they are to support the army in storming a well-defended Russian redoubt.

The marines are put into the attack. Fynmore, who has learned that his wife has given birth to a baby, almost certainly Harry’s, angrily gives the latter a dangerous assignment with a grenade party. Harry not only survives, but distinguishes himself.

Blackwood is again badly wounded and wakes up in hospital where he finds Davern nursing him. He is evacuated home to England; the doctors fear for his life, but he does survive. He returns home to Hawks Hill, his marine career almost certainly over. The Colonel has died and he takes up his family inheritance, whilst his step-mother leaves for France. Davern, now amicably separated from her husband, comes to him.
