= The Bolitho novels =

Series of historical novels by Alexander Kent

The Bolitho novels are a series of nautical war novels by Alexander Kent, the pseudonym of British author Douglas Reeman. They focus on the military careers of the fictional Richard Bolitho and Adam Bolitho in the Royal Navy, from the time of the American Revolution past the Napoleonic Era.

== Richard Bolitho ==
Richard Bolitho is a fictional Royal Navy officer who is the main character in Reeman's novels. Bolitho was born in 1756 in Falmouth, Cornwall, in Great Britain, the second son of a prestigious naval family. He joined the navy in 1768 and served in the wars against France and the United States. He was promoted to lieutenant in 1774, captain in 1782, and admiral in 1812. He died in action against the French in 1815. He played a significant role in driving the Americans back to Brooklyn Heights in 1776, helping to secure a decisive British victory in the largest battle of the entire American Revolution.

The name Bolitho is a common Cornish surname, but Reeman says that he borrowed the name Richard Bolitho from a real person, "a distinguished old chap" he had met in the Channel Islands when he sailed his boat there. Reeman also states that the real Richard Bolitho was the brother of the Lord Lieutenant of Cornwall.

Among his fellow officers, Bolitho is known for his tactical ingenuity, his daring, and his disregard of both convention and political expediency. He rises to high rank—despite the opposition of less competent men—because of his ability to win crucial victories against seemingly impossible odds. Among the men of the fleet, Bolitho is known as a demanding but scrupulously fair and humane captain. The men sometimes refer to him, though never to his face, as "Equality Dick". His reputation as a paragon of decency in a brutal world creates a fierce sense of loyalty among those who serve under him.

Officers and men who serve under Bolitho frequently choose, when given the chance, to do so again. Ships in the squadrons he commands as a senior officer are frequently commanded by men who had served as his lieutenants when he was a captain. His most lasting relationships are with Thomas Herrick—a fellow officer and his oldest friend—and John Allday, a former Cornish shepherd who became Bolitho's coxswain and de facto bodyguard.

Bolitho had a number of romances. One of the first was Viola Raymond, the wife of an English diplomat. She died while Bolitho and a small number of his crew were stranded in a boat in the tropics, but it was her courage and sacrifice that rallied the crew. Bolitho married twice. His first wife, Cheney Seton, died in a carriage accident whilst carrying their unborn child. His relationship with the second, Belinda, the mother of his child Elizabeth, deteriorated when it became clear that she was nothing like the person he thought he married and was a very selfish individual. Estranged from her and his daughter, he carried on an increasingly public affair with Lady Catherine Somervell, who was his wife in all but name until his death.

Douglas Reeman uses some real locations as settings for his stories. The fictitious Bolitho ancestral home near Falmouth, Cornwall was inspired by a house which Reeman saw and photographed in the 1960s at Philleigh near the King Harry Ferry in Cornwall. In reality, the house is not near Falmouth at all, so Reeman "relocated" it for his novels. However, the Church of King Charles the Martyr, which is mentioned in the books, really does exist in Falmouth.

Reeman's own Royal Navy career and lifelong interest in sailing informed his seafaring novels. He saw active service with the Royal Navy during the Second World War, serving in the North Sea, Arctic, Atlantic and Mediterranean campaigns. Starting as a midshipman on destroyers, he later transferred to motor torpedo boats, where he was twice mentioned in dispatches.

== Adam Bolitho ==
Adam Bolitho is a fictional Royal Navy officer who is another main character in Reeman's novels, succeeding the previous main character, Richard Bolitho.

In Enemy in Sight, Richard Bolitho is joined by his nephew Adam Pascoe, who is later renamed Adam Bolitho when he becomes Richard's heir. Adam, the only son of Richard's disgraced older brother Hugh, was born in 1780 in Penzance, Cornwall, shortly after his father joined the revolution in America. Having been sent to Richard at the age of 14 by his dying mother, he joined the Royal Navy, rising through the ranks to establish himself as a daring and resourceful frigate captain, as his uncle had once done.

Adam's role in the series steadily increases as Richard ages and achieves high rank. After Richard's death, he becomes the principal character in the series.

== Books in the series ==
Novels of the series
Internal chronology	Title	Publication date	ISBN	Set in
01	Richard Bolitho, Midshipman	1975	ISBN 0-399-61004-9	1772
02	Midshipman Bolitho and the Avenger	1978	ISBN 0-399-20652-3	1773
03	Band of Brothers	2006	ISBN 0-434-01010-3	1774
04	Stand into Danger	1980	ISBN 0-09-925380-1	1774
05	In Gallant Company	1977	ISBN 0-09-916970-3	1777
06	Sloop of War	1972	ISBN 0-09-908820-7	1778
07	To Glory We Steer	1968	ISBN 978-0-09-952786-2	1782
08	Command a King's Ship	1973	ISBN 978-0-09-954985-7	1784
09	Passage To Mutiny	1976	ISBN 978-0-09-126330-0	1789
10	With All Despatch	1988	ISBN 978-0-09-949388-4	1792
11	Form Line of Battle	1969	ISBN 978-0-09-908850-9	1793
12	Enemy in Sight!	1970	ISBN 0-09-905520-1	1794
13	Flag Captain	1971	ISBN 0-09-907180-0	1797
14	Signal – Close Action!	1974	ISBN 0-09-912940-X	1798
15	The Inshore Squadron	1978	ISBN 0-09-134580-4	1800
16	A Tradition of Victory	1981	ISBN 978-0-09-949767-7	1801
17	Success to the Brave	1983	ISBN 0-09-936370-4	1802
18	Colours Aloft!	1986	ISBN 978-0-09-954339-8	1803
19	Honour This Day	1987	ISBN 978-0-09-954341-1	1804
20	The Only Victor	1990	ISBN 0-330-31840-3	1806
21	Beyond The Reef	1992	ISBN 0-330-31957-4	1808
22	The Darkening Sea	1993	ISBN 0-330-32917-0	1809
23	For My Country's Freedom	1995	ISBN 0-330-34474-9	1811
24	Cross of St. George	1996	ISBN 978-0-09-949773-8	1813
25	Sword of Honour	1998	ISBN 0-09-942168-2	1814
26	Second to None	1999	ISBN 0-09-928059-0	1815
27	Relentless Pursuit	2001	ISBN 978-0-434-00884-1	1815
28	Man of War	2003	ISBN 978-0-434-01008-0	1817
29	Heart of Oak	2007	ISBN 978-0-434-01351-7	1818
30	In the King's Name	2011	ISBN 978-1-84605-543-0	1819

Several omnibus editions have also been released which collect multiple books from the series into one volume:

Anthologies of the series
Title	Publication date	ISBN	Volumes included
Midshipman Bolitho		ISBN 0-09-986350-2	Richard Bolitho, Midshipman; Midshipman Bolitho and the Avenger
Captain Richard Bolitho, RN	1978	ISBN 978-0-09-134130-5	Sloop of War; To Glory We Steer; Command a King's Ship
Bolitho			Colours Aloft; Honour This Day; The Only Victor
The Bolitho Omnibus	1991	ISBN 0-09-175118-7	Stand into Danger; In Gallant Company; Sloop of War
Bolitho	1993	ISBN 0-434-00024-8	With All Despatch; Honour This Day; The Only Victor
The Complete Midshipman Bolitho	2006	ISBN 978-1-59013-127-5	Richard Bolitho, Midshipman; Midshipman Bolitho and the Avenger; Band of Brothers

== Ships in which Bolitho serves ==
Ships served in by Richard Bolitho
Book	Ship	Guns	Class	Commanding Officer	Rank	Year
	HMS Manxman	80	Third-rate ship of the line	Captain Sir Henry Langford	Midshipman	1768–1772
Richard Bolitho, Midshipman	HMS Gorgon	74	Third-rate ship of the line	Captain Beves Conway	Midshipman	1772
Midshipman Bolitho and the Avenger	HM Cutter Avenger	10–6 lb guns	Cutter	Lieutenant Hugh Bolitho	Midshipman	1773
Band of Brothers	HM Schooner Hotspur	14	Armed schooner	Lieutenant Montagu Verling	Midshipman	1774
Stand into Danger	HMS Destiny	28	Frigate	Captain Henry Dumaresq	Lieutenant	1774
In Gallant Company	HMS Trojan	80	Third-rate ship of the line	Captain Gilbert Pears	Lieutenant	1777
Sloop of War	HM Sloop Sparrow	18	Sloop-of-war	Commander Richard Bolitho	Commander, junior captain	1778–1781
To Glory We Steer	HMS Phalarope	32	Frigate	Captain Richard Bolitho	Post captain	1782
Command a King's Ship	HMS Undine	32	Frigate	Captain Richard Bolitho	Post captain	1784
Passage To Mutiny	HMS Tempest	36	Frigate	Captain Richard Bolitho	Post captain	1789
With All Dispatch	HM Cutter Telemachus	12	Cutter	Lieutenant Jonas Paice	Captain-in-chief	1792
With All Dispatch	HM Cutter Snapdragon	12	Cutter	Lieutenant Hector Vatass	Captain-in-chief	1792
With All Dispatch	HM Cutter Wakeful	12	Cutter	Lieutenant Charles Queely	Captain-in-chief	1792
Form Line of Battle! Enemy in Sight!	HMS Hyperion	74	Third-rate ship of the line	Captain Richard Bolitho	Post captain	1793
The Flag Captain	HMS Euryalus	100	First-rate ship of the line	Captain Richard Bolitho	Post captain	1797
Signal – Close Action!	HMS Lysander	74	Third-rate ship of the line	Captain Thomas Herrick	Commodore	1798
The Inshore Squadron; A Tradition of Victory	HMS Benbow	74	Third-rate ship of the line	Captain Thomas Herrick	Rear-admiral	1800–1801
Success to the Brave	HMS Achates	64	Third-rate ship of the line	Captain Valentine Keen	Vice-admiral	1802
Colours Aloft!	HMS Argonaute	74	Third-rate ship of the line	Captain Valentine Keen	Vice-admiral	1803
Honour This Day	HMS Hyperion	74	Third-rate ship of the line	Captain Edmund Haven; Captain Valentine Keen	Vice-admiral	1804–1805
The Only Victor	HMS Truculent	36	Frigate	Captain Daniel Poland	Vice-admiral	1806
The Only Victor; Beyond The Reef	HMS Black Prince	94	Second-rate ship of the line	Captain Valentine Keen	Vice-admiral	1806–1809
The Darkening Sea	HMS Valkyrie	42	Frigate	Captain Aaron Trevenen	Vice-admiral	1809–1810
For My Country's Freedom; Cross of St George	HMS Indomitable	44	Razee	Captain James Tyacke	Admiral	1811–1813
Sword of Honour	HMS Frobisher	74	Third-rate ship of the line	Captain James Tyacke	Admiral	1814

Ships served in by Adam Bolitho
Book	Ship	Guns	Class	Commanding Officer	Rank	Year
Enemy in Sight!	HMS Hyperion	74	Third-rate ship of the line	Richard Bolitho	Midshipman	1794
	HMS Impulsive	64	Third-rate ship of the line	Thomas Herrick	Midshipman	1795–1797
Signal -Close Action!	HMS Lysander	74	Third-rate ship of the line	Richard Bolitho (commodore)	Lieutenant	1798–1800
The Inshore Squadron	HMS Benbow	74	Third-rate ship of the line	Thomas Herrick (Flag Captain)	Lieutenant	1800–1801
A Tradition of Victory	HMS Phalarope	32	Frigate	Daniel Emes	Lieutenant	1801
Success to the Brave	HMS Achates	64	Third-rate ship of the line	Valentine Keen (Flag Captain)	Flag Lieutenant	1802
Colours Aloft! Honour This Day	HMS Firefly	14	Brig	Adam Bolitho	Commander/captain	1803–1805
The Only Victor; Beyond the Reef; The Darkening Sea; For My Country's Freedom	HMS Anemone	38	Frigate	Adam Bolitho	Captain	1806–1812
Cross of St George; Sword of Honour	HMS Valkyrie	42	Frigate	Adam Bolitho	Flag captain	1813–1814
Second to None; Relentless Pursuit	HMS Unrivalled	46	Frigate	Adam Bolitho	Captain	1815
Man of War	HMS Athena	74	Third-rate ship of the line	Adam Bolitho	Flag captain	1817
Heart of Oak; In The King's Name	HMS Onward	38	Frigate	Adam Bolitho	Captain	1818–1819

== See also ==
- Horatio Hornblower
- Douglas Reeman
