= The Captain from Connecticut =

1941 novel by C. S. Forester

The captain from Connecticut
- First edition cover
- Author: C. S. Forester
- Publication date: 1941
- Pages: 344
- ISBN: 9781877853302

The Captain from Connecticut is a novel, published in 1941, by C. S. Forester, the author of the novels about fictional Royal Navy officer Horatio Hornblower. The Captain from Connecticut is set at the tail end of the Napoleonic Wars, and the War of 1812. It was written at the beginning of World War II. Forester wanted to write a novel where both American and British sailors could be heroic and admirable.

== Plot ==
Captain Josiah Peabody, United States Navy, in command of the USS Delaware, is the viewpoint character. Peabody has served in the Navy since its earliest days; He also overcame alcoholism by sheer will power, having come from a family of alcoholics. To help save his brother from the same fate, he ships him aboard as captain's clerk with the rank of midshipman.

The Delaware escapes from blockaded New York City in the winter of 1813-1814 and sails south to destroy British commerce in the Caribbean. In doing so, a French vessel appears, and neither the Americans nor the British know that Napoleon has surrendered, the French monarchy has been restored, and France is now at peace with Britain. The French vessel carries the new Royalist French governor of a Caribbean island and some of his beautiful relatives.

The Delaware proceeds to capture a British post-office packet carrying the pay for the British Army in Canada, then raids several islands, including St. Kitts. In the course of action, off the weather shore of Martinique, Delaware encounters the frigate HMS Calypso, Sir Hugh Davenant, commanding, accompanied by two smaller ships. The action between the four is interrupted when the French inform both parties that they will not allow French neutrality to be violated.

Both belligerents are trapped by a rule of international law which requires twenty-four hours to pass before ships of one belligerent power can sail after a ship of the opposing side can sail. Davenant, a man of hot-tempered speech, insists he sail first, because he cannot allow the Americans a free hand at sea; to do so would lead to his court-martial. Peabody replies "We have courts-martial in our service, too." The Governor suggests anchoring overnight.

The next morning, at the exact minute of dawn, both the Calypso and the Delaware cast loose and set sail for international waters. They are so closely matched that the French fire on both ships, warning them to come about. This time, the Governor suggests an armistice of a week.

During the week, Peabody falls in love with Anne de Villebois, the daughter of the Governor, and marries her. Unfortunately, his young brother, who hates the rigid discipline of naval life, deserts the ship and marries a wealthy French widow.

Both sides accept a temporary agreement to work together to eliminate a pirate who is plaguing local commerce under the assumption neither frigate can chase him. Peabody is wounded, though not seriously; Davenant insists that his surgeon examine the wound. Both ships return to Martinique under the terms of the previous armistice. During this period, two British sailors desert the Calypso for the Delaware. Davenant requests that they be returned, but Peabody must refuse. Davenant comments that American deserters marry rich planters, especially if they are captain's brothers. Peabody demands a duel.

The duel is fought. Neither man is wounded, to each other's relief. Peabody then challenges Davenant to a ship-to-ship duel, as the only way the Delaware can be free to take action against a British convoy forming to attack New Orleans. The novel ends with the Americans and British learning that peace has been declared in their war. The American and British captains both end up marrying beautiful French women, becoming friends and in-laws.

== Reception ==
Beverly Britton wrote in the Richmond Times-Dispatch that the book "has enough virility and swift, sudden danger about it to make it more than acceptable as a top-drawer novel in ordinary circumstances ... but coming as it does from Forester's pen it seems a bit too calm, and somehow lacking in the good red-blooded qualities that made 'Hornblower' so uniquely compelling". In his review for The Associated Press, John Selby wrote that Forester "has the gift of making the adventurous men seem like the exploits of an intimate friend", and that the "Captain is another of those shrewd men who handle a ship like Ralph de Palma used to handle a racing car".

Ralph Thompson wrote in The New York Times that he wished he "could write a hymn in praise of Forester, or at least hang out a few flags in honor of his latest historical novel ... his seagoing yarns ... have always been good, but to come upon 'The Captain from Connecticut' in a season spotted with some of the worst historical fiction since the days of the late Lydia Maria Child is like finding a bottle of brandy in a carton of sweet coal-tar-dye soda pop". Howard Mumford Jones wrote in The Saturday Review that Forester's novel is a "frank return to the sea-yarn formula of Captain Marryat and James Fenimore Cooper both with respect to the time and substance of the story and with respect to the technique". He went on to say the "story bears marks of haste and improvisation ... and the characters are sufficient for romantic narrative, but they are without depth and have only elementary psychology".
