= HMS Berkeley =

Several ships of the Royal Navy have been named HMS Berkeley

- HMS Berkeley (L17), a Hunt-class destroyer built in 1940 and destroyed during the Dieppe Raid in 1942
- HMS Berkeley (M40), a Hunt-class mine countermeasures vessel commissioned in 1986 and sold to Greece in 2001

== See also ==
- HMS Berkeley Castle
