= Nora Gordon =

British actress (1893–1970)

Nora Gordon (29 November 1893 – 11 May 1970) was a British film and television actress. She was married to Leonard Sharp. Her daughter was actress Dorothy Gordon. She also appeared in several British Ministry of Information films, particularly during World War II.

Gordon was born in West Hartlepool on 29 November 1893 and died in London on 11 May 1970 at the age of 76.

== Selected filmography ==
- Facing the Music (1941)
- Danny Boy (1941) - Mrs. Maloney
- Old Mother Riley's Circus (1941) - 1st Charwoman
- Sheepdog of the Hills (1941) - Mrs. Weeks, Varney's housekeeper (uncredited)
- Somewhere in Camp (1942) - Matron (uncredited)
- Front Line Kids (1942) - Evacuee organiser
- Green Fingers (1947) - Mrs. Green (uncredited)
- Death in High Heels (1947) - Miss Arris
- The Mark of Cain (1947) - Guard (uncredited)
- Journey Ahead (1947) - Mrs. Deacon
- My Brother Jonathan (1948) - Mrs. Stevens
- The Fallen Idol (1948) - Waitress (uncredited)
- Floodtide (1949) - Mrs. Dow (uncredited)
- Once a Sinner (1950) - Mrs. Barker (uncredited)
- The Woman in Question (1950) - Neighbour (uncredited)
- Blackmailed (1951) - Sine's Housekeeper
- Circle of Danger (1951) - Sheila (uncredited)
- Night Was Our Friend (1951) - Kate
- The Woman's Angle (1952) - (Guest House Owner) - (uncredited)
- Sing Along with Me (1952)
- Murder at 3am (1953) - Nanna
- Twice Upon a Time (1953) - Emma
- Murder by Proxy (1954) - Casey's Mother
- Radio Cab Murder (1954) - Fred's landlady (uncredited)
- The Glass Cage (1955) - Marie Sapolio
- The Constant Husband (1955) - Housekeeper (uncredited)
- Police Dog (1955) - Mrs. Lewis
- A Kid for Two Farthings (1955) - Customer (uncredited)
- Woman in a Dressing Gown (1957) - Mrs. Williams
- Sapphire (1959) - Newsagent's Wife (uncredited)
- Horrors of the Black Museum (1959) - Woman in Hall
- High Jump (1959) - Mrs. Barlow
- Top Floor Girl (1959) - (uncredited)
- The Grass Is Greener (1960) - Housekeeper (uncredited)
- Sentenced for Life (1960) - (uncredited)
- Ticket to Paradise (1961) - Mrs. Withers
- Victim (1961) - Farr's housekeeper (uncredited)
- Konga (1961) - Lady at Party (uncredited)
- Four Winds Island (1961) - Mrs. Bennett
- Twice Round the Daffodils (1962) - Cleaner
- The Piper's Tune (1962) - Theresa
- Heavens Above! (1963) - Old lady in garden (uncredited)
- Carry On Spying (1964) - Elderly Woman (uncredited)
- The Curse of the Mummy's Tomb (1964) - Sir Giles's Housekeeper (uncredited)
- The Nanny (1965) - Mrs. Griggs
