= HMS Dorsetshire =

Three ships of the Royal Navy have been named HMS Dorsetshire, after the traditional county of Dorsetshire:

- HMS Dorsetshire (1694) was an 80-gun third rate launched in 1694, rebuilt in 1712, and sold in 1749.
- HMS Dorsetshire (1757) was a 70-gun third rate launched in 1757 and broken up in 1775.
- HMS Dorsetshire (40) was a County-class heavy cruiser launched in 1929 and sunk in 1942.
