= Midshipman Bolitho and the Avenger =

1978 novel by Douglas Reeman

First edition (publ. Hutchinson)

Midshipman Bolitho and the Avenger is a historical fiction novel written by Douglas Reeman under the pseudonym Alexander Kent. Set in the late-18th-century Royal Navy, the book is part of the Bolitho series and follows the main character Richard Bolitho.

== Plot ==
Bolitho and Dancer are given leave from the Gorgon after its return to Plymouth for a refit. They decide to spend this holiday at the Bolitho estate. However, soon after they arrive a taxman is killed. Because they are the only agents of the King locally, they must investigate the body and suspect that he was killed by either smugglers or wreckers. Soon after, Hugh Bolitho arrives, charged with finding and capturing whoever committed the crime, and Bolitho and Dancer are ordered temporarily under his command. With the midshipman aboard, they hunt the wreckers. They capture a vessel smuggling guns and learn that they are connected to the shipwreckers. Trying to set a trap, they send the guns in a small convey under the command of Dancer. The convey runs into an ambush in which Dancer is captured. The smugglers release Dancer who recognizes the voice of their leader, as a local member of the landed gentry. He attempts to flee to France in a private yacht, however a lucky suggestion by Bolitho allows Hugh to catch the yacht in flight, which the Avenger captures with little resistance.

== Characters ==
- Richard Bolitho - a 17-year-old midshipman aboard HMS Gorgon and the son of a long line of Naval Officers.
- Martyn Dancer - Friend of Bolitho and also a midshipman aboard the Gorgon
- Hugh Bolitho - Lieutenant and commander of HMS Avenger and short-tempered brother of Richard Bolitho

== Ships ==
- His Majesty's Ship Avenger - a 70-foot cutter armed with ten 6-pounders and having a crew of 60

== Publication history ==
The book was originally published in 1978 as an independent novel. However, it later appeared published with other novels omnibuses titled Midshipman Bolitho, which included Richard Bolitho, Midshipman, and that omnibus was republished in The Complete Midshipman Bolitho in 2006 with the addition of the 2006 tale Band of Brothers.
