= Richard Bolitho, Midshipman =

1975 novel by Alexander Kent

- First edition
- Author: Alexander Kent
- Published: 1975 by Hutchinson
- Followed by: Midshipman Bolitho and the Avenger

Richard Bolitho, Midshipman is a novel in the Bolitho series of nautical fiction set in the late-18th-century Royal Navy, written by Douglas Reeman under the pseudonym Alexander Kent. The book was published in 1975. It was the eighth novel in the series, though it is set earlier than the others, at the start of the career of Richard Bolitho.

== Plot ==
The book opens with Richard Bolitho arriving at a Portsmouth inn frequented by midshipmen. There he meets another midshipman, Martyn Dancer. A lieutenant recalls them to their ship, HMS Gorgon, a 74-gun ship of the line. Sailing towards West Africa, they encounter an empty merchantman, City of Athens. Dancer and Bolitho are sent aboard the ship and discover that it has been pillaged and the crew killed. The officers soon deduce that the ship was raided by pirates and Captain Conway announces that the Admiralty had dispatched them to investigate the disappearance of ships in the region. In company with the captured City of Athens, Gorgon approaches a coastal fort surrounded by treacherous reefs and shoals. They sight two ships in the nearby harbour. The fort then opens fire and disables City of Athens. Gorgon withdraws and returns after dark to salvage the ship. Dancer and Bolitho are sent on the mission, commanded by the 4th lieutenant, Mr. Tregorren, who holds a grudge against Bolitho's prestigious heritage. They succeed at taking the ship, and also capture a slave dhow in the escape, with the help of Gorgon. The ships, under the guise of being members of the pirate fleet, raid the castle which the pirates had been using as a base.

== Characters ==
- Richard Bolitho – 16-year-old midshipman and a son and grandson of Royal Navy admirals
- Martyn Dancer – 16-year-old midshipman with only three-months experience in the navy
- Captain Conway – Captain of HMS Gorgon

== Publication history ==
Richard Bolitho, Midshipman was first published in 1975 as an independent novel. Later it was included in the anthology Midshipman Bolitho, which also contained the novel Midshipman Bolitho and the Avenger. A collection, The Complete Midshipman Bolitho included both Midshipman Bolitho and the Avenger and Band of Brothers.
