= Mark Joseph (author) =

American novelist

Mark Joseph is an American novelist. He is the author of To Kill the Potemkin, originally published in 1986. As a paperback, it spent four weeks on The New York Times bestseller list in July and August 1987.

He later published the novels Alpha 7 (1990), Typhoon (1991), Deadline Y2K (1999), and The Wild Card (2011).

Born in 1946 in Vallejo, California, he is a 1967 graduate of the University of California, Berkeley.

== Reviews ==
- Krystal, Arthur. "The Cold War Takes a Dive; To Kill the Potemkin", The Washington Post, Page C3, 1 September 1986.
- Clark, G. "Silent war beneath the waves", The Courier-Mail, Brisbane, Australia, 19 September 1987.
- van Rjndt, Phillip. "Shattering myths of US might", Toronto Star, Page M7, 27 September 1986.
- Goodreads Ratings and Reviews of Mark Joseph's 5 novels, Mark Joseph Author Page
