= HMS Manxman =

Two ships of the Royal Navy have borne the name HMS Manxman, after the term for an inhabitant of the Isle of Man:

- HMS Manxman (1916) was a ferry launched in 1903 and requisitioned by the Royal Navy in 1915 for conversion to a sea plane carrier. Returned to civilian service in 1920, the ship was requisitioned as a radar training vessel, HMS Caduceus, during World War II and scrapped in 1945.
- HMS Manxman (M70) was an Abdiel-class minelayer launched in 1940, converted to a minesweeper support ship in 1963, and sold for breaking up in 1972.
