= List of people with Royal Navy ships named after them =

This is an incomplete list of people that have or had ships or ship classes named after them, or the name is associated with the person. The ships are currently or were previously in service with the Royal Navy, the United Kingdom's naval warfare force; or with predecessor fleets formally in the service of the Kingdom of England; or of the English Commonwealth. The list also includes fictional vessels which have prominently featured in literature about the Royal Navy.

== Active Commissioned Ships ==
=== Ship classes ===
Some people have had Royal ship classes named after them, the following are a list of people who had such classes named after them.

==== Queen Elizabeth I ====
The following ship class was named after HMS Queen Elizabeth the first aircraft carrier commissioned in the class which was named after the dreadnought battleship HMS Queen Elizabeth in service from 1914 to 1948 which itself was named after the Tudor monarch Queen Elizabeth I.

Class	Preceded by	Type	Planned	Completed	Active	Commissioned	Decommissioned	Displacement	Homeport	Note
Queen Elizabeth class	Invincible class	Aircraft carrier	2	2	2	2017–present	n/a	65,000	Portsmouth	

=== Ships ===
==== Monarchs ====
The following are British monarchs who have had Royal navy ships named after them.

===== Queen Elizabeth II =====
There are no ships named after Queen Elizabeth II.

===== King Charles III =====
The following are ships named after King Charles III the former Prince of Wales and Duke of Cornwall and Edinburgh.

Ship	Class	Pennant No.	Commissioned	Decommissioned	Displacement	Type	Homeport	Note
HMS Prince of Wales	Queen Elizabeth class	R09	2019	n/a	65,000 tonnes	Aircraft carrier	Portsmouth	

==== Dukes ====
===== Dukes of Northumberland and the Percy Family =====
The following are ships named after Dukes of Northumberland as well as the Percy Family, also known of the House of Percy.

====== Duke of Northumberland ======
The following are named after the title of Duke of Northumberland rather than any holder of that title.

Ship	Class	Pennant No.	Commissioned	Decommissioned	Displacement	Type	Homeport	Note
HMS Northumberland	Type 23 (Duke class)	F238	1994	n/a	4,900 tonnes	Guided missile frigate	Devonport	

====== Sir Henry Percy (Hotspur) ======
The following are ships named Hotspur the nicknamed for the 14th century noblemen Sir Henry Percy.

Ship	Class	Pennant No.	Commissioned	Decommissioned	Displacement	Type	Homeport	Note
HMS Hotspur	Fifth-rate	n/a	1810	1821	n/a	Frigate	n/a	
HMS Hotspur	Fifth-rate	n/a	1828	1902	n/a	Frigate	n/a	
HMS Hotspur	unknown	n/a	1828	1902	unknown	Ironclad Ram	n/a	

===== Other Dukes =====
The following are Dukes with ships named after them.

Named After	Ship	Class	Pennant No.	Commissioned		Homeport	Note
Arthur Wellesley, 1st Duke of Wellington	HMS Iron Duke	Type 23 (Duke class)	F234	1993	4,900 tonnes	Portsmouth	
John Churchill, 1st Duke of Marlborouh	HMS Marlborough	Type 23 (Duke class)	F235	1993	4,900 tonnes	Devonport	
James Scott, 1st Duke of Monmouth	HMS Monmouth	Type 23 (Duke class)	F235	1993	4,900 tonnes	Devonport	

===== Dukedom Title =====
The following are named after various Dukedom titles rather than any holder of those titles.

Named After	Holder at time of Commissionship	Current Holder	Ship	Class	Pennant No.	Commissioned	Displacement	Type	Homeport	Note
Duke of Argyll	Ian Campbell, 12th Duke of Argyll	Torquhil Campbell, 13th Duke of Argyll	HMS Argyll	Type 23 (Duke class)	F231	1991	4,900 tonnes	Guided missile frigate	Devonport	
Duke of Lancaster	Queen Elizabeth II	King Charles III	HMS Lancaster	Type 23 (Duke class)	F229	1992	4,900 tonnes	Guided missile frigate	Portsmouth	
Duke of Montrose	James Graham, 8th Duke of Montrose		HMS Montrose	Type 23 (Duke class)	F236	1994	4,900 tonnes	Guided missile frigate	Devonport	(Note: HMS Montrose is forward deployed, operating from HMS Jufair in Bahrain.)
Duke of Westminster	Gerald Grosvenor, 6th Duke of Westminster	Hugh Grosvenor, 7th Duke of Westminster	HMS Westminster	Type 23 (Duke class)	F237	1994	4,900 tonnes	Guided missile frigate	Portsmouth	
Duke of Richmond	Charles Gordon-Lennox, 10th Duke of Richmond	Charles Gordon-Lennox, 11th Duke of Richmond	HMS Richmond	Type 23 (Duke class)	F239	1995	4,900 tonnes	Guided missile frigate	Devonport	
Duke of Somerset	John Seymour, 19th Duke of Somerset		HMS Somerset	Type 23 (Duke class)	F82	1996	4,900 tonnes	Guided missile frigate	Devonport	
Duke of Sutherland	Francis Egerton, 7th Duke of Sutherland		HMS Sutherland	Type 23 (Duke class)	F81	1997	4,900 tonnes	Guided missile frigate	Devonport	
Duke of Kent	Prince Edward, Duke of Kent		HMS Kent	Type 23 (Duke class)	F78	2000	4,900 tonnes	Guided missile frigate	Portsmouth	
Duke of Portland	Victor Cavendish-Bentinck, 9th Duke of Portland	Title Extinct (1990)	HMS Portland	Type 23 (Duke class)	F79	2001	4,900 tonnes	Guided missile frigate	Devonport	
Duke of St Albans	Murray Beauclerk, 14th Duke of St Albans		HMS St Albans	Type 23 (Duke class)	F83	2002	4,900 tonnes	Guided missile frigate	Devonport	

=== Royal Navy Admirals ===
Named After	Ship	Class	Pennant No.	Commissioned	Displacement	Type	Homeport	Note
Adam Duncan, 1st Viscount Duncan	HMS Duncan	Type 45 (Daring class)	D37	2013	8,500 tonnes	Guided missile destroyer	Portsmouth	
George Anson, 1st Baron Anson	HMS Anson	Astute-class submarine	S123	2022	7,000 to 7,400 tonnes	Nuclear submarine		

=== Mythological/Semi-Mythological ===
Named After	Class	Ship	Pennant No.	Commissioned	Displacement	Type	Homeport	Note
Gaius Mucius Scaevola	Type 45 (Daring class)	HMS Daring	D32	2009	8,500 tonnes	Guided missile destroyer	Portsmouth	
Agamemnon	HMS Agamemnon	Astute-class submarine	S124	2025	7,000 to 7,400 tonnes			

=== Explorers ===
Named After	Class	Ship	Pennant No.	Commissioned	Displacement	Type	Homeport	Note
Robert Falcon Scott	Echo class	HMS Scott	H131	1997	13,500 tonnes	Ocean survey	Devonport	

== Fictional RN ship names ==
=== Deities ===
The following fictional ships are named after deities.

Name	Ship	From	Created By	Medium	Published	Type	Note
Pluto	HMS Pluto	A Ship of the Line	C. S. Forester	Novel	1938		
Venus	Venus	Good Ship Venus		Song			

=== Other ===
Name	Ship	From	Created By	Medium	Published	Type	Note
Hotspur	HMS Hotspur	Hornblower and the Hotspur	C. S. Forester	Novel	1962	Sloop	
Caligula	Caligula	A Ship of the Line	C. S. Forester	Novel	1938		
