= To Kill the Potemkin =

1986 novel by Mark Joseph

- Author: Mark Joseph
- Language: English
- Genre: Historical fiction
- Publisher: Hardcover, paperback
- Publication date: 1986
- Media type: Print
- Pages: 255 (hardcover)
- ISBN: 9780917657801

To Kill the Potemkin (ISBN 978-0917657801) is a novel by Mark Joseph, set during the Cold War, that relies on historical American and Soviet tensions. New technology escalates pressure between the super powers, leading to a duel. It was originally published in 1986, and the paperback spent four weeks on The New York Times bestseller list in July and August 1987.

== Plot summary ==
In 1968, U.S. and Soviet forces are engaging in brinkmanship across the seas. As submarines play a dangerous cat-and-mouse game, To Kill the Potemkin tells the story of a confrontation between these vessels - one being a new and advanced class of submarine whose existence must remain a secret.

Jack Sorensen, one of the Navy's best sonar operators, is sonar chief of USS Barracuda, a nuclear-powered Skipjack-class submarine. He has demons - drink and drugs - but it's tolerated because he is an expert technician. Sorensen can find and identify submarines as few others can. Fogarty, a promising but inexperienced sonar analyst newly assigned to Barracuda, is determined to learn from Sorensen.

The novel begins as the Barracuda departs its east coast base for the Mediterranean. Once there, Barracuda engages in anti-submarine warfare exercises with other Western submarines. Its mission is to "hunt" the U.S. Navy's 6th Fleet and the flagship, the aircraft carrier. The Barracuda "sinks" several of the American submarines playing the Soviet Navy vessels. But the drill is interrupted by the appearance of a submarine that Fogarty correctly identifies as a Soviet sub, using masking technology to appear as an American vessel.

The first of its kind, Potemkin is equipped with experimental stereo/sonar systems, designed to reproduce signatures of American, British, and other submarines, to fool the sonar nets stationed in the Pacific and Atlantic Oceans. As the Potemkin inserts itself into the Western navies' exercise, the political officer takes command of the vessel and places the captain under arrest for his repeated insults against the political officer and what he deems "un-Soviet remarks". Unfortunately, his incompetence leads to a collision with Barracuda, damaging the Barracuda's bow. Sorenson records the Soviet vessel being crushed by the water pressure as it sinks. To his amazement, he hears what he thinks is torpedo being fired from the sinking vessel before it plunges to the ocean floor. Sorenson's recording is sealed under orders from the submarine's captain, and the damaged American vessel makes its way back to port and dry-dock for repairs.

While Barracuda survives, and reports the accident to higher authorities, it is revealed that the Soviet ship was damaged by the collision, but did not sink. It was able to duplicate the sound of an actual submarine breaking up and playing it through the sophisticated stereo system.

Sorenson soon comes to suspect that the mystery sub did not really sink. Unbeknownst to the superior officers of the ship, he made a separate recording of the collision and the sinking, and after listening to it, suspects something is wrong - the sound mistaken for the torpedo firing was actually the Soviet's electric motors driving the submarine away. When titanium fragments are found on a repaired portion of the bow that came contact with the other submarine during the collision, the crew realize that there is a revolutionary class of submarine. The new class is designated an Alfa class submarine. The American vessel is assigned the top-secret mission of tracking down the Potemkin.

With the Soviet sub's political officer under arrest for negligence, and the captain back in command, the Potemkin sails for the Atlantic Ocean, and a rendezvous with Soviet vessels in Cuba. The environmental system was damaged, leading to a build-up of carbon dioxide. Once in the Atlantic Ocean, the Soviet ship reaches full speed, and outpaces Barracuda.

The Potemkin reaches Cuba, and makes a rendezvous with the secret submarine stationed off the coast. This was supposed to be a top-secret meeting because of the Cuban Missile Crisis. Just as the two vessels are about to make contact, Barracuda arrives on the scene. Crew members on all three vessels realize the disastrous consequences of the Barracudas arrival at that exact time. The Soviets realize that the American sub must be sunk before reporting the presence of Soviet vessels in Cuban waters. Potemkin fires first, but the torpedo misses. The Soviet vessel is too deep to shoot with the standard American torpedo, so Sorenson orders the firing of a nuclear Mk 45 ASTOR torpedo. The explosion from the nuclear torpedo destroys the Potemkin. Sorenson and Fogarty retire to Sorenson's bunk. The torpedo that was fired earlier by the Russian sub malfunctions and goes to "active seeking" mode and homes in on the noise made by Barracuda's reactor pumps.

== Historical basis ==
While To Kill the Potemkin is a work of fiction, the novel shares parallels with the true story of the loss of USS Scorpion (SSN-589), a Skipjack-class nuclear fast-attack submarine which sank in the Atlantic on May 22, 1968, under circumstances that have yet to be explained. The time and place setting of To Kill the Potemkin parallel those of the Scorpion, which had been involved in operations in the Mediterranean Sea in 1968. A real scorpion is kept aboard Barracuda as the boat's mascot.

Since 1968, a willful Soviet attack has been offered as one of several explanations for the loss of Scorpion. At least two books - All Hands Down: The True Story of the Soviet Attack on the USS Scorpion by Kenneth Sewell and Jerome Preisler, and Scorpion Down: Sunk by the Soviets, Buried by the Pentagon: The Untold Story of the USS Scorpion by Ed Offley - claim that the Soviets sank Scorpion in retaliation for the loss of one their submarine K-129 earlier that year.

== Reviews ==
- Krystal, Arthur. "The Cold War Takes a Dive; To Kill the Potemkin", Washington Post, Page C3, 1 September 1986.
- Clark, G. "Silent war beneath the waves," The Courier-Mail, 19 September 1987.
- van Rjndt, Phillip. "Shattering myths of US might," Toronto Star, Page M7, 27 September 1986.
