= HMS Penzance =

There have been four ships of the Royal Navy name HMS Penzance, named for the port of Penzance in Cornwall. The ships motto is Diligenter Pensa (Diligent thought).

- The first HMS Penzance (1665) was a frigate of 1665
- The second HMS Penzance (1747) was a frigate of 1747
- The third HMS Penzance (L28) was a Hastings-class sloop launched in 1930 and torpedoed and sunk in 1940 whilst on convoy protection duty by U-37.
- The fourth HMS Penzance (M106) was a Sandown-class minehunter launched in 1997, commissioned in 1998 and decommissioned in 2024.
