= HMS Leviathan =

Four ships of the Royal Navy have been named HMS Leviathan:

- The first Leviathan was a 70-gun third-rate ship of the line launched in 1750 as Northumberland, renamed in 1777 and sunk in 1780 in the Atlantic.
- The second HMS Leviathan (1790) was a 74-gun third rate launched in 1790. She fought at the Battle of Trafalgar, was used as a convict ship from 1816 and sold in 1848.
- The third HMS Leviathan (1901) was a Drake-class armoured cruiser launched in 1901 and sold for scrap in 1920.
- The fourth Leviathan was a Majestic-class aircraft carrier. She was launched in 1945 but never completed and scrapped in 1968.

== Other uses ==
HMS Leviathan was also the subject of John Winton's 1967 novel of the same name, concerning a troubled aircraft carrier and its new executive officer. The novel details the trials and tribulations of Commander Bob Markready who tries to inspire his sailors and airmen alike to get the warship back on track. He is let down by air staff, his captain, and the British Admiralty. Very few of his colleagues appreciate the work put in by him and his achievements. At the end, he is quite unceremoniously transferred from the ship and posted as a naval attaché in Washington, D.C.
