= The Intruders (novel) =

1994 novel by Stephen Coonts

The Intruder
- Author: Stephen Coonts
- Language: English
- Genre: Techno-thriller novel
- Publisher: Pocket Books
- Publication date: October 1994
- Publication place: United States
- Media type: Print (hardback & paperback)
- ISBN: 0-67187-060-2
- OCLC: 1355363757

The Intruders is a 1994 novel by Stephen Coonts and is a sequel to his 1986 novel Flight of the Intruder.

== Plot ==
After two combat cruises, Grafton is now a flight instructor on a naval base. While visiting his girlfriend Callie, he has an argument with her father, who is anti-war. Distraught, Grafton is later involved in a bar brawl with another man who is anti-war. His shore duty is cut short and he is sent on another cruise to help train a USMC A-6 squadron.

Grafton witnesses accident after accident, some with fatal results. He encounters a faulty arresting cable, an in-flight fire, a night landing in bad weather, a cold shot and lightning striking his aircraft. Grafton is thinking about quitting the Navy but eventually makes up his mind to stay.

The book ends when Grafton is shot down by a weapons smuggler and is captured. He and his BN survive, although injured, and escape from their captor.

== Characters ==
- Lt. Jake "Cool Hand" Grafton – Naval aviator, protagonist
- Capt. Clarence Odysseus "Flap" Le Beau – Grafton's bombardier/navigator, an ex-Marine recon officer
- "Real McCoy" – Navy landing signal officer, also A-6 pilot
- Callie McKenzie – Grafton's girlfriend, repeated character

== Aircraft appearing/mentioned ==
- Grumman A-6 Intruder – two-man, twin-engine bomber flown from aircraft carriers
- McDonnell Douglas F-4 Phantom II – two-man, twin-engine fighter bomber flown from aircraft carriers
- LTV A-7 Corsair II – one-man, carrier-borne, light bomber
- North American A-5 Vigilante – two-man, twin-engine, carrier-borne, reconnaissance aircraft
