= Vincent Mulchrone =

20th century English journalist

Vincent Joseph Mulchrone (1923 – 1 October 1977) was an English journalist active during the post-war period. After nearly three decades at the Daily Mail, he died of leukaemia at the age of 54.

== Early life ==
Mulchrone grew up in Morley, West Yorkshire and was educated at Morley Grammar School. He left school at 16 and took a job dressing window dummies before he joined his local paper, the Morley Observer.

== Second World War ==
During the Second World War Mulchrone was a pilot in the Royal Air Force with active service in Burma, reaching the rank of flying officer.

== Daily Mail ==
After the war he joined the Daily Mail in Manchester before moving to Fleet Street in 1950. During his career in journalism, he covered events including the withdrawal of American forces from Vietnam, numerous royal tours, and social commentary such as the decline of the English sausage. He was awarded the Descriptive Writer of the Year award in 1964 and again in 1970 when he shared it with Keith Waterhouse.

In 2005 he was entered into a Hall of Fame as one of the 40 greatest journalists by Press Gazette magazine, and his likeness was displayed at the National Portrait Gallery.

== Family life ==
Married to Louie, the couple had three sons. Mulchrone died on 1 October at St Bartholemews's Hospital in London aged 54.
