= HMS Manchester =

Three ships of the Royal Navy have borne the name HMS Manchester after the city of Manchester in the north-west of England.

- HMS Manchester was a hired store ship in 1814.
- HMS Manchester (15) was a Town-class cruiser launched in 1937 and lost in action in 1942.
- HMS Manchester (D95) was a Type 42 (Batch 3) destroyer launched in 1980. She participated in the 1991 Gulf War and was decommissioned on 17 February 2011.

== Battle honours ==
- Norway 1940
- Spartivento 1940
- Malta 1942
- Arctic 1942
- Kuwait 1991
