= HMS Beaufort =

Two ships of the Royal Navy have been named HMS Beaufort:

- HMS Beaufort (1919) was a Hunt-class minesweeper ordered as Ambleside but renamed in 1918 and redesignated as a survey ship. She was launched in 1919 and sold for scrap in 1938.
- HMS Beaufort (L14) was a Hunt-class destroyer launched in 1941 and transferred to Norway in 1952. She was renamed HNoMS Haugesund in 1954 and scrapped in 1965
