= The Cruiser =

Book by Warren Tute

- First edition
- Author: Warren Tute
- Publisher: Cassell
- Publication date: 1955
- Media type: print
- Pages: 381
- ISBN: 0330240196

The Cruiser is a novel of war at sea by Warren Tute. It follows the story of HMS Antigone, a fictional British Leander-class cruiser of the Second World War named after the mythical Greek character Antigone. The novel paints a realistic picture of life on a cruiser in the late 1930s and early war years: the principal character is the ship herself, with many members of her crew (from the captain to the "three fat men of the sea") as supporting actors. The author had served on HMS Ajax, a real Leander-class cruiser, during the 1930s.

Published in 1955, The Cruiser ran to three editions in a matter of weeks.

HMS Antigone is not to be confused with HMS Antigone of the Nathaniel Drinkwater series by Richard Woodman.
