= Victor Suthren =

Canadian writer and historian

Victor Suthren (born March 2, 1942) is a Canadian writer and novelist with an interest in colonial and maritime history.

== Career ==
Born in Montreal, Suthren was educated at Bishop's University (BA, 1965) and Concordia University (MA, 1970). He joined the Civil Service and rose to serve as Director General of the Canadian War Museum, Ottawa (1986-1997) before leaving to pursue a writing career. A former university naval reservist, he was appointed an Honorary Captain(N) in the Royal Canadian Navy (1997-2014), to do heritage event planning. He has been President of the international Captain Cook Society since May 2023, and has been an occasional film adviser and voyage crew in the replica of HM Bark "Endeavour" and other ships. From 1983 to 1993 he sang in the chorus and in some minor lead roles with the Ottawa Savoy Society's Gilbert and Sullivan productions. In 1969 he married Lindsay Scott of Montreal, an artist and teacher of biology, and they have three children, who also have families.

== Publications ==
=== Paul Gallant series ===
Set in mid-18th century

1. The Black Cockade (1977) (ISBN 0-8125-8862-2)
2. A King's Ransom (1980) (ISBN 0-8125-8866-5)
3. In Perilous Seas (1983) (ISBN 0-8125-8868-1)

=== Edward Mainwaring series ===
Starts in 1739

1. Royal Yankee (1987) (ISBN 0-586-20429-6)
2. The Golden Galleon (1988) (ISBN 0-312-02216-6)
3. Admiral of Fear (1991) (ISBN 0-340-63840-0)
4. Captain Monsoon (1993) (ISBN 0-312-08728-4)

=== Non-fiction ===
- "The Oxford Book of Canadian Military Anecdotes" (1989) ISBN 0195407113
- "Canadian Stories of the Sea" (1993) ISBN 0195408497
- "The War of 1812" (1999)(ISBN 0-7710-8317-3)
- "To Go Upon Discovery: James Cook And Canada" (2000) (ISBN 1-55002-327-6)
- "The Sea Has No End: The Life of Louis-Antoine de Bougainville" (2004) (ISBN 1-55002-519-8)
- "The Island Of Canada" (2009) (ISBN 0887624065)
- "Black Flag of the North: Bartholomew Roberts, King of Atlantic Pirates" (2018) ISBN 9781459736009
