= Warren Tute =

English sailor, author and television executive

Warren Tute (1914–1989) was an English sailor, author and television executive. He was born in 1914 in West Hartlepool, County Durham in the north of England and joined the Royal Navy in 1932, at one time serving on HMS Ajax. During the Second World War he served on Lord Louis Mountbatten's staff and took part in amphibious landings in North Africa, Sicily and Normandy.

Following his retirement in 1946 he wrote for television and radio, under contract to Ted Kavanagh, famous for the radio series ITMA. At London Weekend Television he was Head of Scripts. For BBC television he originated The Commanding Sea series and wrote the book with co-author Clare Francis. His other film and television credits include The Forth Road Bridge (nominated for an Oscar for Best Documentary), Journey Ahead and ITV Play of the Week.

Global sales of his more than 30 books are well over the million copies, the most successful of his novels being The Rock (set in Gibraltar during the Second World War), The Cruiser (in which the fictional HMS Antigone bears a striking resemblance to HMS Ajax), The Admiral, The Golden Greek and Leviathan, favourably reviewed by the Montreal Gazette who described Tute as "a gifted writer".

He died in 1989 in south-west France.
