= Final Flight =

1988 novel by Stephen Coonts

- First edition
- Author: Stephen Coonts
- Language: English
- Genre: Techno-thriller novel
- Publisher: Doubleday
- Publication place: United States
- Media type: Print (hardback & paperback)
- ISBN: 0-385-24555-6

Final Flight is a 1988 techno-thriller novel by Stephen Coonts.

== Plot ==
Jake "Cool Hand" Grafton is now a CAG on a cruise in the Mediterranean. A group of terrorists kidnap some Navy crew members and learn how to penetrate the ship. Led by Qazi, they intend to steal nuclear bombs from the carrier. Meanwhile, Grafton deals with two accidents, leadership problems, and himself facing being grounded due to deteriorated night sight. An anti-terror-team led by Judith Farrell is after Qazi.

The terrorist successfully penetrate the ship during a port visit using uniform deception and helicopters. After taking the ship, with Admiral Parker as a hostage, they load six nuclear weapons onto three helicopters. The crew of the ship does not want them stolen, and in independent actions, contrary to orders, they destroy two helicopters. One gets away with two devices and Kazhi on board. Grafton is the surviving senior officer after Admiral "Cowboy" Parker, Captain James (CO of the ship), and the XO of the ship are killed. The admiral commanding the Mediterranean fleet is hesitant to hunt the helicopter which contains the nuclear weapons. Grafton disobeys him and pilots an F-14 hunting for the terrorists. He surmises that both weapons were transferred from the helicopters onto airplanes. He destroys the first aircraft, but the second aircraft is bound for Israel and has a fighter escort. He is able to down three of the six fighter aircraft, and is trying to down the other transport aircraft containing the missing nuclear missile. Running out of missiles and with his cannon jammed, Grafton opts to ram his F-14 into the enemy aircraft.

In the end it is not clear if Grafton survives. A later novel, The Minotaur, describes the events after Grafton rammed the aircraft.

== Characters ==
- Jake "Cool Hand" Grafton: Naval aviator and the protagonist
- Robert "Toad" Tarkington: F-14 RIO pilot; appears later in a sequel novel
- "Cowboy" Parker: Grafton's former squadron mate; admiral and commanding officer of the task force
- Reed: Grafton’s navigator; wanted to quit flying and died in an accident
- Callie: Grafton's wife; they meet when Grafton tours Hong Kong
