= Stephen Coonts =

American novelist (born 1946)

- Born: July 19, 1946 (age 80); Buckhannon, West Virginia, U.S.
- Education: West Virginia University (BA)
- Occupation: Novelist
- Spouse: Deborah Coonts (m. 2011; died 2025)
- Writing career
- Language: English
- Years active: 1984–present
- Genre: Spy fiction
- Website: www.coonts.com

Stephen Coonts (born July 19, 1946) is an American spy thriller and suspense novelist.

== Early life, education, and military career ==
Stephen Coonts grew up in Buckhannon, West Virginia, a small coal mining town. Following high school graduation, he earned a B.A. degree in political science at West Virginia University in 1968. After joining the Navy upon graduation and then going to officer candidate school, Coonts went to flight school at Naval Air Station Pensacola and earned his wings as a naval aviator in 1969.

Coonts was later assigned to Naval Air Station Whidbey Island and VA-128 to train in the A-6 Intruder, a medium attack, all-weather, carrier-based jet. After training, he was attached to and deployed with VA-196 to Vietnam. With 196, he served aboard the USS Enterprise (CVN-65) on two cruises and accumulated 1600 flying hours in the A-6. Coonts was awarded several commendations, including the Distinguished Flying Cross.

After Vietnam, Coonts served as an A-6 flight instructor for two years, then was assigned as an assistant catapult and arresting gear officer aboard USS Nimitz (CVN-68). He separated from the active duty Navy as a lieutenant in 1977 but remained as reserve officer, retiring as a commander with a total of 21 years of service.

== Post military career ==
=== Lawyer ===
After leaving active duty, Coonts pursued a Juris Doctor (J.D.) degree at the University of Colorado, graduating in 1979. He then worked as a lawyer for several oil and gas companies, pursuing his writing interests in his free time.

=== Writer ===
Coonts began writing Flight of the Intruder in 1984; it was published by the US Naval Institute Press in 1986. The novel, based in part on his experiences as an A-6 pilot during the Vietnam War, remained for 28 weeks on the New York Times bestseller list, and in 1991 was made into a movie. This launched his career as a novelist, and he continued writing adventure-thrillers, most of them based on the main character from his first book, Jake Grafton. Coonts has also written several other series and stand-alone novels, but is best known for the Grafton books.

In 1992, he was inducted into the Academy of Distinguished Alumni at his alma mater, West Virginia University. In 2014, West Virginia University awarded him an honorary Doctor of Letters degree.

As of 2013, Coonts continues to write, having had 16 New York Times bestsellers (out of 36 books). He lives in Colorado. He was married to romantic mystery novelist Deborah Coonts, his third wife, from September 2011 until her death on February 1, 2025.

== Bibliography ==
=== Jake Grafton series ===
Note: The list below represents Stephen Coonts' suggested reading order.

#	Title	Publication date	ISBN	Notes
1	Flight of the Intruder	1986	0-87021-200-1	Adapted into a film in 1991
2	The Intruders	1994	1-59114-128-1	
3	Final Flight	1988	0-385-24555-6	
4	The Minotaur	1989	0-440-20742-8	
5	Under Siege	1990	0-671-72229-8	
6	The Red Horseman	1993	0-671-74887-4	
7	Cuba	1999	0-312-20521-X	Also featuring Tommy Carmellini
8	Hong Kong	2000	0-312-25339-7	Also featuring Tommy Carmellini
9	America	2001	0-312-25341-9	Also featuring Tommy Carmellini
10	Liberty	2003	0-312-28361-X	Also featuring Tommy Carmellini

=== Jake Grafton and Tommy Carmellini series ===
Note: The list below represents Stephen Coonts' suggested reading order.

#	Title	Publication date	ISBN	Notes
1	Liars and Thieves	2004	0-312-28362-8	Also known as Wages of Sin
2	The Traitor	2006	0-312-32359-X	
3	The Assassin	2008	0-312-99446-X	Also featuring Jake Grafton
4	The Disciple	2009	0-312-37283-3	Also featuring Jake Grafton
5	Pirate Alley	2013	0-312-37284-1	Also featuring Jake Grafton
6	The Art of War	2016	1-786-48363-8	Also featuring Tommy Carmellini
7	Liberty's Last Stand	2016	1-621-57507-8	Also featuring Tommy Carmellini
8	The Armageddon File	2017	1-621-57659-0	Also featuring Tommy Carmellini
9	The Russia Account	2019	1-621-57660-0	Also featuring Jake Grafton

=== Saucer series ===
#	Title	Publication date	ISBN
1	Saucer	2002	0-312-98321-2
2	Saucer: The Conquest	2004	0-312-99448-6
3	Saucer: Savage Planet	2014	1-250-06198-9

=== Anthologies ===
#	Title	Publication date	ISBN
1	Combat	2002	0-8125-7615-2
2	Combat Vol. 2	2002	0-8125-7616-0
3	Combat Vol. 3	2002	0-8125-7617-9
4	On Glorious Wings	2005	0-8125-7863-5
5	Victory	2003	0-7653-0581-X
6	Victory: Call to Arms	2004	0-8125-6167-8
7	Victory: Into the Fire	2004	0-8125-6168-6
8	Victory: On the Attack	2004	0-8125-6169-4
9	War in the Air	1999	0-6718-8191-4

=== Deep Black series ===
#	Title	Publication date	ISBN	Co-authored with
1	Deep Black	2003	0-312-98520-7	Jim DeFelice
2	Biowar	2004	0-752-86117-4	Jim DeFelice
3	Dark Zone	2004	0-752-87785-2	Jim DeFelice
4	Payback	2005	0-312-93698-2	Jim DeFelice
5	Jihad	2007	0-312-93699-0	Jim DeFelice
6	Conspiracy	2008	0-312-93700-8	Jim DeFelice
7	Arctic Gold	2009	0-312-94695-3	William H. Keith
8	Sea of Terror	2010	0-312-94696-1	William H. Keith
9	Death Wave	2011	0-312-67113-X	William H. Keith

=== Others ===
- Fortunes of War (1998), ISBN 0-312-18583-9, ISBN 0-312-96941-4
- The Garden of Eden (2006) (writing as Eve Adams)
- The Sea Witch (May 2012), ISBN 0-7653-3231-0, ISBN 978-0-7653-3231-8

=== As editor ===
- The 17th Day (1999)
- Combat (2001) ISBN 0-312-87190-2
- Victory (2003) ISBN 0-312-87462-6 OCLC 51322993

=== Non-fiction ===
- The Cannibal Queen: A Flight into the Heart of America (1992), ISBN 0-671-74884-X
- War In The Air: True Accounts (1996), ISBN 0-671-88190-6
- On Glorious Wings: The Best Flying Stories (2003), ISBN 0-312-87724-2
- Victory (2003), ISBN 0-312-87462-6
