= HMS Berkeley Castle =

Two ships of the British Royal Navy have been named HMS Berkeley Castle after Berkeley Castle in the town of Berkeley, Gloucestershire.

- Berkeley Castle was a 48-gun wooden warship captured by the French Navy on 25 October 1695.
- HMS Berkeley Castle (K387) was a Castle-class corvette which was built during the Second World War.
