= Douglas Reeman =

British writer

Douglas Edward Reeman (15 October 1924 – 23 January 2017), who also used the pseudonym Alexander Kent, was a British author who wrote many historical novels about the Royal Navy, mainly set during either World War II or the Napoleonic Wars. He wrote a total of 68 novels, selling 34 million copies in twenty languages.

== Biography ==
Reeman was born in Thames Ditton, Surrey, son of Charles "Percy" and Ada Reeman.

At the beginning of the Second World War he joined the Royal Navy's boys' training establishment HMS Ganges. In 1940 Reeman was appointed Midshipman, at the age of 16. His initial service was in destroyers on convoy duty in the North Atlantic. During this time his ship was sunk and Reeman was injured by exploding depth charges. Later he transferred to Motor Torpedo Boats and was present subsequently at D-Day in a landing craft. It was then that he was injured badly when his landing craft was hit by shellfire. He finished the war in Kiel repairing damage to make the port usable again, with the rank of Lieutenant.

After the war, Reeman joined the Metropolitan Police, serving as a beat officer and later in the Criminal investigation department. At the beginning of the Korean War he rejoined the Navy. At the end of the war he joined London County Council as a child welfare officer, but remained a Lieutenant-Commander in the Royal Naval Reserve.

== Novels ==
Reeman's debut novel, A Prayer for the Ship, was published in 1958. Reeman is most famous for his series of Napoleonic naval stories, the main character of which is Richard Bolitho, and, later, his nephew, Adam Bolitho. Reeman also wrote a series of novels about several generations of the fictional Blackwood family who served in the Royal Marines from the 1850s to the 1980s, and a non-fiction account of his own Second World War experiences, D-Day: A Personal Reminiscence (1984). He used the pseudonym Alexander Kent (the real name of a friend and naval officer who died during the Second World War) for his Bolitho novels and his real name for his other novels and non-fiction.

== Teacher and advisor ==
In addition to being an author, Reeman also taught navigation for yachting and served as a technical advisor for movies.

== Personal life ==
Reeman was married twice; first to Winifred Melville, and later, after he was widowed, to Canadian author Kimberley Jordan in 1985.

== Bibliography (with publication dates) ==
=== World War II novels ===
Title	Original publication	Reference
A Prayer for the Ship	1958	ISBN 0-515-05783-5
Dive in the Sun	1961	ISBN 0-09-111300-8
The Hostile Shore	1962	ISBN 0-09-907880-5
With Blood and Iron	1964	ISBN 0-09-105660-8
HMS Saracen	1965	ISBN 0-09-906260-7
The Pride and the Anguish	1968	ISBN 0-09-087440-4
To Risks Unknown	1969	ISBN 0-09-097520-0
Rendezvous – South Atlantic	1972	ISBN 0-09-109270-1
His Majesty's U-Boat (also named Go in and Sink!)	1973	ISBN 0-399-11195-6; ISBN 0-09-114620-8
The Destroyers	1974	ISBN 0-09-119940-9
Winged Escort	1975	ISBN 0-09-124740-3
Surface with Daring	1976	ISBN 0-09-127630-6
Strike from the Sea	1978	ISBN 0-09-918780-9
A Ship Must Die	1979	ISBN 0-09-138150-9
Torpedo Run	1981	ISBN 0-688-00133-5
The Volunteers	1985	ISBN 0-09-160070-7
The Iron Pirate	1986	ISBN 0-7737-2105-3
In Danger's Hour	1988	ISBN 0-434-62632-5
The White Guns	1989	ISBN 0-434-62634-1
Killing Ground	1991	ISBN 0-434-62638-4
Sunset	1994	ISBN 0-434-62635-X
A Dawn Like Thunder	1996	ISBN 0-434-00215-1
Battlecruiser	1997	ISBN 0-434-00291-7
For Valour	2000	ISBN 0-434-00719-6
Twelve Seconds to Live	2002	ISBN 0-434-00874-5
The Glory Boys	2008	ISBN 978-0-434-01352-4

=== The Blackwood Saga ===
aka The Royal Marines Saga

- Badge of Glory (1982) (1st in plot sequence)
- The First to Land (1984) (2nd)
- The Horizon (1993) (3rd)
- Dust on the Sea (1999) (4th)
- Knife Edge (2004) (5th)

=== Other settings ===
- High Water (1959)
- Send a Gunboat (1960)
- The Hostile Shore (1962)
- The Last Raider (1963)
- Path of the Storm (1966)
- The Deep Silence (1967)
- The Greatest Enemy (1970)

=== The Bolitho novels ===
==== Richard Bolitho novels ====
(using the name Alexander Kent)

Novels of the series
Internal chronology	Title	Publication date
01	Richard Bolitho, Midshipman	(1975)
02	Midshipman Bolitho and the 'Avenger'	(1978)
03	Band of Brothers	(2005)
04	Stand into Danger	(1980)
05	In Gallant Company	(1977)
06	Sloop of War	(1972)
07	To Glory We Steer	(1968)
08	Command a King's Ship	(1973)
09	Passage To Mutiny	(1976)
10	With All Despatch	(1988)
11	Form Line of Battle!	(1969)
12	Enemy in Sight!	(1970)
13	Flag Captain	(1971)
14	Signal – Close Action!	(1974)
15	The Inshore Squadron	(1977)
16	A Tradition of Victory	(1981)
17	Success to the Brave	(1983)
18	Colours Aloft	(1986)
19	Honour This Day	(1987)
20	The Only Victor	(1990)
21	Beyond The Reef	(1992)
22	The Darkening Sea	(1993)
23	For My Country's Freedom	(1995)
24	Cross of St. George	(1996)
25	Sword of Honour	(1998)

==== Adam Bolitho novels ====
n.b. these follow directly the Richard Bolitho novels

- Second to None (1999)
- Relentless Pursuit (2001)
- Man of War (2003)
- Heart of Oak (2007)
- In the King's Name (2011)
