= John Winton =

British navy officer and writer

John Pratt, pen name John Winton (3 May 1931 in London – 27 April 2001) was an English author and obituarist, following a career in the Royal Navy in which he rose to Lieutenant-Commander. He was born in London and served in the Korean War and during the Suez Crisis. Whilst still in the Navy, he wrote the comic novel We Joined the Navy and its sequels, featuring the character of "The Artful Bodger". Several other novels, and a number of non-fiction works on naval subjects, followed, including a biography of Admiral John Jellicoe, 1st Earl Jellicoe. Pratt also served for 14 years as an obituarist for The Daily Telegraph.

== Works ==
=== Fiction ===
- We Joined the Navy (London: Michael Joseph, 1959)
- We Saw the Sea (London: Michael Joseph, 1960)
- Down the Hatch (London: Michael Joseph, 1961)
- Never Go to Sea (London: Michael Joseph, 1963)
- All the Nice Girls (London: Michael Joseph, 1964)
- HMS Leviathan (London: Michael Joseph, 1967)
- The Fighting "Téméraire" (London: Michael Joseph, 1971)
- One of our Warships (London: Michael Joseph, 1975)
- Good Enough for Nelson (London: Michael Joseph, 1977)
- Aircraft Carrier (London: Michael Joseph, 1980)
- The Good Ship Venus, or, The Lass who Loved a Sailor: a novel (London: Michael Joseph, 1984)
- A Drowning War: a novel (London: Michael Joseph, 1985)
- Polaris (London: Michael Joseph, 1989)
- The Night of the Scorpion (Sutton: Severn House, 1994)

=== Non-fiction ===
- Freedom's Battle: The War at Sea 1939–1945: An Anthology of Personal Experience (London: Hutchinson, 1967)
- The Forgotten Fleet (London: Michael Joseph, 1969) [account of the British Pacific Fleet]
- HMS Campbeltown (USS Buchanan) (Windsor: Profile Publications, 1971) [Profile Warship No. 5]
- The Little Wonder: the story of the Festiniog Railway (London: Michael Joseph, 1975)
- Sir Walter Ralegh (London: Michael Joseph, 1975)
- Air Power at Sea 1939-1945 (London: Sidgwick & Jackson, 1976)
- Hurrah for the Life of a Sailor: Life on the Lower-deck of the Victorian Navy (London: Michael Joseph, 1977)
- The Victoria Cross at Sea (London: Michael Joseph, 1978)
- War in the Pacific: Pearl Harbor to Tokyo Bay (London: Sidgwick & Jackson, 1978)
- Sink the Haguro!: The Last Destroyer Action of the Second World War (London: Seeley, 1979)
- Hands to Action Stations!: Naval Poetry and Verse from World War Two (Denbigh: Bluejacket, 1980)
- Find, Fix and Strike!: the Fleet Air Arm at War 1939-1945 (London: Batsford, 1980)
- Below the Belt: Novelty, Subterfuge and Surprise in Naval Warfare (London: Conway Maritime, 1981)
- Jellicoe (London: Michael Joseph, 1981) ISBN 978-0718118136 [biography of Admiral Earl John Rushworth Jellicoe]
- Captains and Kings: The Royal Family and the Royal Navy, 1901–1981 (Denbigh: Bluejacket, 1981)
- Convoy: The Defence of Sea Trade 1890-1980 (London: Michael Joseph, 1983)
- The Death of the Scharnhorst (Chichester: Antony Bird, 1983) ISBN 0907319068 [sinking of the Scharnhorst in the Battle of the North Cape]
- The Little Wonder: 150 years of Festiniog Railway (Revised edition) (London: Michael Joseph, 1986)
- Carrier Glorious: The Life & Death of an Aircraft Carrier (London: Leo Cooper, 1986)
- Air Power at Sea [1940 to Today] (London: Sidgwick & Jackson, 1987)
- Warrior The First and the Last (London: Maritime Books, 1987)
- ULTRA at Sea (London: Leo Cooper, 1988)
- The Naval Heritage of Portsmouth (Southampton: Ensign, 1989)
- For Those in Peril: Fifty Years of Royal Navy Search and Rescue (London: Robert Hale, 1992)
- Ultra in the Pacific: How Breaking Japanese Codes & Cyphers Affected Naval Operations Against Japan 1941–45 (London: Leo Cooper, 1993)
- Signals from the Falklands : the Navy in the Falklands Conflict: An Anthology of Personal Experience (London : Leo Cooper, 1995)
- Cunningham (London : John Murray, 1998) [biography of Admiral Sir Andrew Browne Cunningham]
- The Submariners : Life in British Submarines 1901–1999: An Anthology of Personal Experience (London : Constable, 1999)
- An Illustrated History of the Royal Navy (London: Salamander, 2000)
