= The Hand of Destiny =

The Hand of Destiny is a short story C.S. Forester wrote about his most popular character, Horatio Hornblower, written in 1940, and published in Collier's magazine. Sanford Sternlicht, author of C. S. Forester and the Hornblower Saga, notes the story has multiple inconsistencies with later stories. He also notes elements of the story that Forester re-used in later stories.

In the story Hornblower is 20 years old, and has just been promoted to Lieutenant. Sternlicht places the story in late 1796. Forester has Hornblower recently transferred from serving under Edward Pellew, the genuine naval hero who is Hornblower's first mentor. But Sternlicht notes that in Mr Midshipman Hornblower Hornblower served under Pellew until 1797.

== Plot summary ==
"The Hand of Destiny" has Hornblower serving on board the fictional HMS Marguerite, under the despotic Captain Courtney. Hornblower is shocked by Courtney's cruelty. Courtney has goaded some of his men to revolt and Hornblower is sent to negotiate. Courtney is careless in the instructions he gives Hornblower, and is very angry with him when Hornblower promises them Courtney will not retaliate against them.

Courtney plans to brutally punish the men without regard to Hornblower's assurances to them. A battle forces a delay in Courtney's plans. Hornblower leads the rebellious sailors in boarding the hostile Spanish warship, the Castilla.

Courtney is pleased with Hornblower, and assigns him the task of sailing the captured vessel to port. Hornblower seizes the opportunity that, instead of punishing the alleged mutineers he assigns them to serve as his prize crew.

== Place in the Hornblower stories ==
Sternlicht notes that Forester re-used the premise of Hornblower angering a senior officer whose instructions gave him the leeway to be lenient with mutineers.

Forester wrote the Hornblower stories out of order. The Happy Return, set in 1808 and the first Hornblower novel written, takes place relatively late in his career. In Chapter IX Hornblower dons his dress uniform, when preparing to meet an important person. His preparation includes strapping on his dress sword, "('a sword of the value of fifty guineas,' the gift of the Patriotic Fund for Lieutenant Hornblower's part in the capture of the Castilla six years ago)". In Chapter XIII Hornblower is embarrassed when Lady Barbara admires his hands, which he thinks are ugly. In particular he is embarrassed by an "ingrained powder stain" on his left hand, dating to his leading the boarding party that captured the Castilla.

Forester's second and third novels, A Ship of the Line, and Flying Colours also refer to the sword he was awarded for his role in the capture of the Castilla. In the fifth novel, Lord Hornblower, an older Hornblower reminds himself that he remains the brave officer who led the boarding of the Castilla.

Sternlicht notes that the eighth novel Forester wrote, HMS Atropos, set in 1805–06, contains a completely different account of the capture of the Castilla. In that novel Hornblower is a junior post-captain, and the capture occurs off the coast of Cartagena, Spain.
