= Hornblower in the West Indies =

1957 novel by C. S. Forester

- First edition
- Author: C. S. Forester
- Language: English
- Series: Horatio Hornblower
- Genre: Historical novel
- Publisher: Michael Joseph, London
- Publication date: 1957
- Publication place: United Kingdom
- Media type: Hardcover & paperback
- Pages: 255 pp
- OCLC: 16564559
- Preceded by: Lord Hornblower (1946)
- Followed by: The Last Encounter

Hornblower in the West Indies, or alternately Admiral Hornblower in the West Indies, is one of the novels in the series that C. S. Forester wrote about fictional Royal Navy officer Horatio Hornblower.

All the other novels in the series take place during the wars with revolutionary and Napoleonic France; this one, however, takes place when Britain is at peace, May 1821 – October 1823. Hornblower has been promoted rear-admiral and named in command of the West Indies Station (in the Caribbean) with a squadron consisting of three frigates and fourteen brigs and schooners. It is the last Hornblower novel chronologically, although the short story ("The Last Encounter") is set later.

The book's five long, titled chapters can be read as independent novellas, much as the ten titled chapters of Mr. Midshipman Hornblower are a sequence of largely independent short stories.

== Plot summary ==
=== St. Elizabeth of Hungary ===
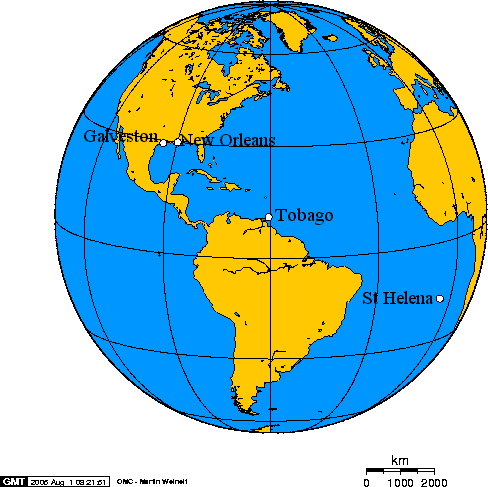
Hornblower left New Orleans and rushed to the channel between Trinidad and Tobago in order to intercept Napoleon's Old Guard on their way from Galveston to free Napoleon from his imprisonment at St Helena.

Hornblower raises his flag in the schooner HMS Crab and pays a courtesy call at New Orleans. There, he learns of a plot by Napoleon's most loyal followers to liberate him from his exile on the isolated island of St Helena. Hornblower intercepts their ship, the Daring, but is powerless to stop them by force; with no other choice, he is prepared to sacrifice his honour for the sake of peace in Europe. He lies to their leader, Count Cambronne, telling him that Napoleon has died. When he returns to port, he learns to his astonishment and relief that his lie was the truth, recalling Saint Elizabeth's miracle of the roses.

=== The Star of the South ===
While attempting to suppress the slave trade, HMS Clorinda, the vessel carrying Hornblower's flag, follows a faster slave ship, the Estrella del Sur, into a Puerto Rican port. Hornblower figures out a way to disable the slave ship, so that when it leaves port, the Clorinda will be able to catch it. Hornblower, characteristically, outsmarts his subordinate, the dim-witted, pompous Captain Fell of the Clorinda to the point he thinks the sabotage plan was his idea.

=== The Bewildered Pirates ===
Pirates kidnap Hornblower and his young secretary Spendlove and take them to their hideout near Montego Bay, in an attempt to extort a pardon for themselves. They send Hornblower with their demand, keeping Spendlove as hostage. Hornblower feels honour-bound to return to secure Spendlove's release, but finds the resourceful secretary has escaped. Free to act, Hornblower leads a sea-borne attack on the pirate's camp, using mortars to reduce their hideout. Forester takes artistic license with the geography of Jamaica.

=== The Guns of Carabobo ===
Hornblower is visited by a rich young wool merchant, named Ramsbottom, one of the first millionaires. The young man is on a tour of the Caribbean in his yacht, a converted ex-Royal Navy brig-sloop, the Bride of Abydos. Hornblower tours Ramsbottom's yacht during a dinner party on board. Ramsbottom explains his interest in Latin America by saying that he has a Venezuelan mother. He is cautioned to stay away from the South American coast, which is in a state of rebellion against Spain.

It turns out, however, that Ramsbottom, far from being a tourist, is dedicated to helping Spain's South American colonies to achieve their independence. While Hornblower and his squadron are conveniently away on manoeuvres, Ramsbottom, by pretending that his yacht is the Desperate, a Royal Navy brig enforcing a (bogus) blockade, captures the Helmond, an unsuspecting Dutch transport, and secures the Spanish artillery train forming its cargo. Hornblower hears the news on his return from manoeuvres and goes to investigate. He finds Ramsbottom's ship, empty, accompanied by the Helmond, anchored off the coast of Venezuela. The captured cannons have been instrumental in the defeat of the Spanish forces. Hornblower secures Bride of Abydos just before the arrival of a Spanish and a Dutch frigate, from where Spanish and Dutch naval officers swiftly arrive to demand its surrender. Hornblower by verbal trickery manages to avoid both surrendering the Bride of Abydos and starting a war.

=== The Hurricane ===
Hornblower's wife Barbara comes out to Jamaica for Hornblower's final days as Commander in Chief, and to accompany him home. Hornblower is troubled by the case of a young marine bandsman, Hudnutt, a naturally gifted musician who refuses to play what he feels is a wrong note. Hornblower is sympathetic to the man's plight, and endeavours to help him, but is constrained by the demands of naval discipline. As the couple leave the island he hears Hudnutt has escaped; later he finds Barbara had arranged it. On the voyage back, they endure a hurricane; Hornblower needs to use his skill as a seaman to ensure their survival. In the middle of the hurricane, Barbara drops her final wall of reserve as she assures him she has never loved another man.

== Chapter order ==
Chapter 4 of the novel, "The Guns of Carabobo," belongs historically immediately after Chapter 1, "St. Elizabeth of Hungary" and, in the original serialisation in John Bull from 1957, "Hornblower and the Guns of Carabobo" was the second episode published. (Napoleon died on 5 May 1821 and the Battle of Carabobo took place on 24 June 1821.) This is the only Hornblower novel where events are not presented in chronological order.

== Inaccuracies ==
In the Royal Navy of the early nineteenth century, promotion from captain to admiral was based solely on seniority; Hornblower would not have been sufficiently senior to be a rear-admiral in 1821.
