= Sixth-rate =

Historic category for Royal Navy ships

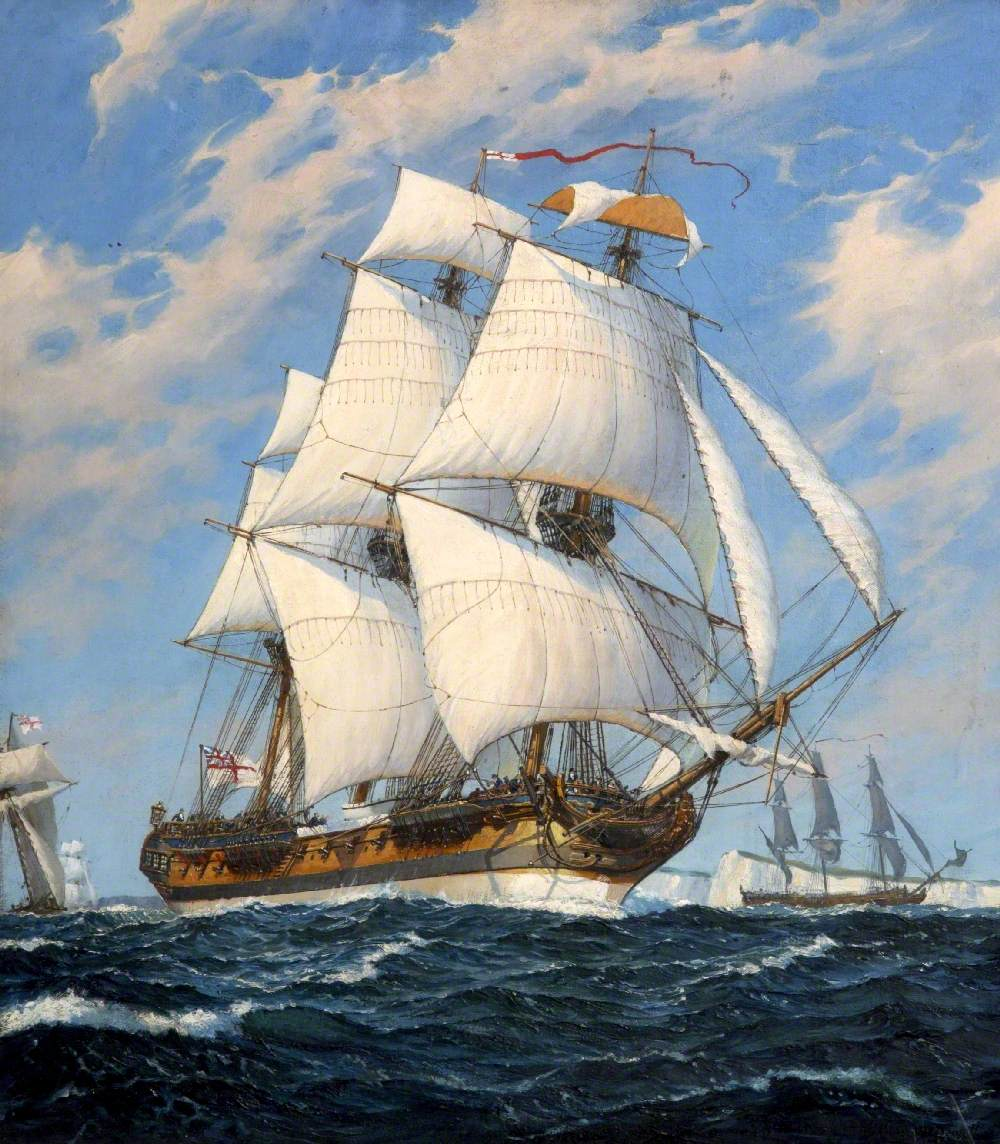
HMS Liverpool, a Coventry-class sixth-rate

In the rating system of the Royal Navy used to categorise sailing warships, a sixth-rate was the designation for small warships mounting between 20 and 28 carriage-mounted guns on a single deck, sometimes with smaller guns on the upper works and sometimes without. It thus encompassed ships with up to 30 guns in all. In the first half of the 18th century the main battery guns were 6-pounders, but by mid-century these were supplanted by 9-pounders. 28-gun sixth-rates were classed as frigates, those smaller as 'post ships', indicating that they were still commanded by a full ('post') captain, as opposed to sloops of 18 guns and less, which were under commanders.

== Rating ==
Sixth-rate ships typically had a crew of about 150–240 men, and measured between 450 and 550 tons. A 28-gun ship would have about 19 officers; commissioned officers would include the captain, and two lieutenants; warrant officers would include the master, ship's surgeon, and purser. The other quarterdeck officers were the chaplain and a Royal Marines lieutenant. The ship also carried the standing warrant officers, the gunner, the bosun and the carpenter, and two master's mates, four midshipmen, an assistant surgeon, and a captain's clerk. The rest of the men were the crew, or the 'lower deck'. They slept in hammocks and ate their simple meals at tables, sitting on wooden benches. A sixth-rate carried about 23 marines, while in a strong crew the bulk of the rest were experienced seamen rated 'able' or 'ordinary'. In a weaker crew there would be a large proportion of 'landsmen', adults who were unused to the sea.

The larger sixth-rates were those of 28 guns (including four smaller guns mounted on the quarterdeck) and were classed as frigates. The smaller sixth-rates with between 20 and 24 guns, still all ship-rigged and sometimes flush-decked vessels, were generally designated as post ships. These vessels could perhaps be considered comparable to the light cruisers and destroyers of more recent times, respectively.

Regardless of armament, sixth-rates were known as "post ships" because, being rated, they were still large enough to have a post-captain in command instead of a lieutenant or commander.

During the Napoleonic Wars (1803–1815), the now elderly sixth-rate frigates were found to be too small for their expected duties, which were more easily performed by fifth-rate frigates. Most were phased out without replacement, although a few lasted in auxiliary roles until after 1815.

== In fiction ==
The Aubrey–Maturin series of novels by Patrick O'Brian features the sixth-rate ship HMS Surprise as the frigate captained by Jack Aubrey. It is based on the actual historical frigate of the same name, formerly the French ship Unité, which was captured and renamed by the Royal Navy in 1796. The Surprise was portrayed in the 2003 film Master and Commander which was adapted from the novels.

In the novel Mason and Dixon by Thomas Pynchon, the title characters set sail for Sumatra in 1761 to view the Venus transit in the sixth-rate ship HMS Seahorse.

The novel The Watering Place of Good Peace by Geoffrey Jenkins includes a fictional sixth-rate ship called HMS Plymouth Sound, which is described as being one of the fastest sailing ships in the Royal Navy.

In Hornblower and the Atropos by C.S. Forester, the titular character – Horatio Hornblower – commands a sixth-rate ship of 22 guns.

== See also ==
- Rating system of the Royal Navy – for ships smaller than sixth-rate
