= Hornblower and the Widow McCool =

- Short story by C. S. Forester
- Country: United Kingdom
- Language: English
- Genre: Historical fiction

Publication
- Published in: Hornblower and the Crisis
- Publisher: Michael Joseph, London
- Media type: Hardcover and paperback
- Publication date: 1967
- Series: Horatio Hornblower

"Hornblower and the Widow McCool" is a short story by C. S. Forester featuring his fictional naval hero Horatio Hornblower. The story is set in the early days of Hornblower's career, when he was still a junior lieutenant on HMS Renown. Chronologically, it comes between Mr. Midshipman Hornblower and Lieutenant Hornblower, and as the third of three short stories set in this period, following "Hornblower and the Hand of Destiny" and "Hornblower and the Big Decision".

== Publishing history ==
The story was first published in the 9 December 1950 issue of The Saturday Evening Post as "Hornblower's Temptation". It was published as "Hornblower and the Widow McCool" in the volume Hornblower and the Crisis, along with the titular unfinished novel and another short story, "The Last Encounter", in 1967 after Forester's death.

== Reception ==
The Glasgow Herald called the story "a neat little tale", adding that "the fact that the conclusion is obvious halfway through in no way mars the enjoyment of reading it".

The Montreal Gazette said that both stories included in the volume "are Forester standard, and I can pay no higher praise than that".

== Plot summary ==
The story opens in the winter of 1799–1800 when "until three months before, [Hornblower] had been a prisoner in Spanish hands." He is the most junior of five lieutenants in the ship of the line HMS Renown. The ship has just captured a French vessel, and one of the prisoners is recognised as Irish revolutionary Barry McCool. Admiral William Cornwallis gives Hornblower the distasteful task of arranging McCool's execution for desertion from the Royal Navy.

Cornwallis insists that McCool is to make no final speech before his execution, so that he cannot try to incite mutiny among the Irish sailors in Renown's crew. Hornblower is unwilling to prevent McCool speaking by gagging him. However, in return for a promise by McCool not to speak before he is hanged, Hornblower agrees to send McCool's only possession, a sailor's sea chest with his name "B I McCOOL" in raised letters on the carved lid, to his widow, along with a covering letter. He is prevented from immediately doing so when Renown has to put hastily to sea after McCool is executed.

While at sea, Hornblower discerns a message hidden in an oddly clumsy poem in McCool's letter. By moving the letters of the carved name in a sequence and in a manner revealed by the poem, a secret compartment forming the lid of the chest is revealed. The compartment is stuffed with currency notes and secret correspondence to other Irish rebels, in fact "Everything one would need to start a rebellion," as Hornblower comments to himself. Hornblower, revolted at the spectacle of McCool's execution and suspecting the money could be French counterfeits, decides to spare other Irishmen from the gallows and throws the chest overboard.

Later, "when the Renown lay in the Hamoaze, completing for the West Indies," he discovers that McCool actually left no widow, and the chest was intended to reach an Irish revolutionary society. As McCool's letter said, he had remained "faithful unto death," though to the cause of Irish independence, not a woman. Hornblower now throws McCool's final letter overboard too. The setting of this final action links it to the opening of Lieutenant Hornblower which begins in mid-1800.
