= Hornblower's Charitable Offering =

"Hornblower's Charitable Offering" is a short story that C. S. Forester wrote about his fictional character Horatio Hornblower, when he was in command of HMS Sutherland.

== Plot ==
In the story, the Sutherland rescues naked and emaciated Frenchmen from a makeshift raft. The men had been prisoners of war who had been confined to the deserted island of Cabrera. In Forester's story, Cabrera was deserted because it had no ports and no foliage. Spanish authorities had landed 20,000 French prisoners on the island. With no ports, the Spanish authorities had left the prisoners unguarded, and the only care they provided were food shipments. The food they supplied was insufficient for the number of prisoners and bad weather could prevent the landing of the food for weeks at a time.

Spanish authorities provided no clothing or blankets to the prisoners and, after two years' confinement, all of their clothes had worn out.

The prisoners tell Hornblower that some of the more desperate men have resorted to cannibalism.

When Hornblower approaches the island he sees that the Spanish victualling ship has given up trying to land food, because the wind is in the wrong quarter for a landing on the island's single beach.

Through his superior seamanship, Hornblower is able to shoot a line to the prisoners and use it to let them tow to shore a casks of food from his own ship's stores.

== Historical context ==
Cabrera is a real island and Spanish authorities did confine French prisoners there. Over 10,000 French prisoners were confined on there in 1808. In 1814, when the war was over, only 3,700 were left to be repatriated.
