= Death to the French =

1932 historical novel by C. S. Forester

- First edition
- Author: C. S. Forester
- Cover artist: Gino d'Achille
- Language: English
- Genre: Historical novel
- Publisher: The Bodley Head
- Publication date: 1932
- Publication place: United Kingdom
- Media type: Print (hardback & paperback)
- ISBN: 978-1-931541-72-5
- OCLC: 74724893

Death to the French is a 1932 novel of the Peninsular War during the Napoleonic Wars, written by C. S. Forester, the author of the Horatio Hornblower novels. It was also published in the United States, under the more generic title Rifleman Dodd.

== Overview ==
The novel relates the adventures of a British rifleman of the 95th Regiment of Foot who is cut off from his regiment when the Allied army retreats behind the Lines of Torres Vedras. He is forced to survive for several months in territory that has been devastated by the Allies and occupied by the French. With some help from a few local Portuguese, Dodd wages guerrilla warfare against the French. The story is told from both the perspective of Dodd and the Frenchmen he is fighting. Its picture of the hero's resolution and devotion to duty in dangerous circumstances caused it to be put on the official reading list endorsed by the Commandant of the United States Marine Corps.

== Plot summary ==
The protagonist is Matthew Dodd, a rifleman of the 95th Regiment of Foot serving in the Peninsular War in the year 1810. The British had sent a small force of about 10,000 men to the aid of her ally, Portugal. Rather than face the numerically superior French forces under Marshal André Masséna, the British commander, Lord Wellington, secretly constructed the Lines of Torres Vedras and withdrew behind them after burning the countryside, leaving the French force no options but to lay siege to the lines, or retreat. For three months the French encamped outside the lines, waiting for reinforcements from the other side of the Tagus River, but in the end hunger and disease forced them to retreat.

During the British withdrawal, Dodd becomes separated from his regiment after coming under fire from French sergeant Gordinot's section, with the entire French army between him and the lines at Torres Vedras. In an attempt to get around the French, he heads for the Tagus River, hoping to follow it to Lisbon. However, the French are there ahead of him, and he has no option but to live off the land and try to survive. After a chance encounter with Portuguese guerillas, he joins them for two months in fighting and harassing the French; during this time, all but one of Gordinot's friends, a private named Dubois, are killed.

Looking for any opportunity to return to his regiment, Dodd takes his friend Bernadino to investigate sounds of artillery fire miles from their band. They meet another Portuguese guerrilla, whose name they never learn, who leads them to the site of the firing. There he sees British soldiers on the other side of the Tagus firing rockets at the town of Santarém, and the French returning cannon fire to stop them. Dodd investigates and finds French soldiers and engineers building a pontoon bridge for Masséna's forces. Gordinot and Dubois are also present, having been reassigned to help finish the bridge.

When the English fortify their firing positions, the French abandon Santarém and haul the unfinished bridge and its supplies upriver to a remote location not far from Dodd's guerillas. Dodd seizes the opportunity to strike a major blow for the English cause. He, Bernardino, and the unnamed guerrilla take shots at the French wagon train, killing several horses and disrupting the transport operation, before returning to their band's headquarters for resupply, only to find that while they were gone the soldiers of Marshal Ney had discovered and wiped out the entire band, taking all the food and putting to death all the men and women.

The three have nothing to eat, so the unnamed guerrilla infiltrates the French lines, stabs Dubois to death, and steals a mule which is slaughtered and processed into jerky. While marching to find the bridge-building camp, the three men are caught by French pursuers; Dodd escapes, but his companions are hanged. He resolutely goes on alone and finds the French encampment. After watching the camp's routines for two days, Dodd goes in under cover of night, kills two sentries, and spreads hot grease and oil (kept in cauldrons by the French for tarring rope, greasing cordage, and waterproofing their boats) over the unfinished bridge and supplies, and sets it all on fire. From his hideout in the rocks, he sees the whole encampment burn and is pleased with his success; he never learns that orders had arrived only that day for the French to burn the encampment themselves since Masséna had ordered a retreat.

In the midst of the chaotic retreat, Gordinot's starving men attack him and desert. With a broken foot, the sergeant is unable to so much as stand up and succumbs to madness before the Portuguese find him. Dodd, on the other hand, makes him way back to Santarém and happily rejoins his regiment; he is unacknowledged, unthanked and unconcerned about his months of demanding effort, but pleased to be given new clothes, a shave, and some bread and salt, which he eagerly devours while watching a distant light: Gordinot being set alight by his captors.

== Homages ==
In Sharpe's Escape (2004), a novel featuring Bernard Cornwell's Napoleonic hero Richard Sharpe (a character modeled after the protagonist of Death to the French), a soldier named Matthew Dodd is separated from Sharpe's company in a skirmish during the Peninsular Campaign in 1810. Cornwell has acknowledged on his website that his Dodd is meant to be the same one Forrester depicted in his original story, implying that both Sharpe and Dodd exist in the same fictional universe.
