= Hornblower and His Majesty =

- Short story by C. S. Forester
- Language: English
- Genre: Historical short story

Publication
- Published in: Collier's
- Publication date: 1940
- Series: Horatio Hornblower

Hornblower and His Majesty is a short story published in 1940 by C.S. Forester set during the War of 1812. Forester's fictional character Horatio Hornblower's is placed command of the Royal Yacht Augusta during a nautical expedition for King George III and his entourage, for the benefit of the King's health.

It was published in Collier's and Argosy magazine in 1940 and 1941 respectively.

George III had a medical condition that caused him to seem "mad" in his later years. The short story is set during the King's mad period. Forester portrays the King being fearful of brutal doctors, and Hornblower feeling sympathy for him.

Fog separates the Augusta from her warship escort. A far larger American vessel sights and chases the yacht, and there is an exchange of fire that damages the Augusta and prevents her escape. Hornblower is faced with surrender and the capture of the King by the Americans, but is saved by the arrival of the escort ship. Hornblower notices that the excitement and distraction seems to trigger an improvement in the King's condition.
