= HMS Hotspur =

Four ships of the British Royal Navy have been named HMS Hotspur after the nickname of Sir Henry Percy:

- HMS Hotspur (1810), a 36-gun fifth rate in service from 1810 to 1821
- HMS Hotspur (1828), a 46-gun fifth rate launched in 1828, a chapel hulk after 1859, renamed Monmouth in 1868, and sold in 1902
- HMS Hotspur (1870), an armoured ram launched in 1870 and sold in 1904
- HMS Hotspur (H01), an H-class destroyer launched in 1936 and transferred to the Dominican Republic in 1948

== Fictional ships ==
- A sloop called Hotspur, armed with twenty 9-pounder cannon and four carronades, appears in the Horatio Hornblower novel, Hornblower and the Hotspur, third in the series
- A Hotspur appears in Sir Arthur Conan Doyle's short story The Adventure of the Gloria Scott
- A schooner called Hotspur appears in the Richard Bolitho novel A Band of Brothers, written by Douglas Reeman (using the pseudonym Alexander Kent).
- A destroyer called Hotspur appears in the Honor Harrington novel The Short Victorious War written by David Weber
