= A Ship of the Line =

Second "Hornblower" novel by C.S. Forester

- First edition (UK)
- Author: C. S. Forester
- Language: English
- Series: Horatio Hornblower
- Genre: Historical novel
- Publisher: Michael Joseph (UK); Little, Brown (US)
- Publication date: 4 April 1938
- Publication place: United Kingdom
- Media type: Print
- Pages: 304
- OCLC: 611456337
- LC Class: PZ3.F75956 Shi2 PR6011.O56
- Preceded by: The Happy Return
- Followed by: Flying Colours

A Ship of the Line is a historical seafaring novel by C. S. Forester. It follows his fictional hero Horatio Hornblower during his tour as captain of a ship of the line. By internal chronology, A Ship of the Line, which follows The Happy Return, is the seventh book in the series (counting the unfinished Hornblower and the Crisis). However, the book, published in 1938, was the second Hornblower novel completed by Forester. It is one of three Hornblower novels adapted into the 1951 British-American film Captain Horatio Hornblower R.N..

== Plot summary ==
Hornblower has recently returned to England from the Pacific in the frigate HMS Lydia, having gained widespread fame (but no financial stability) as a result of sinking the superior ship Natividad in battle. As a reward for his exploits, he is given command of a seventy-four ship of the line, HMS Sutherland, once the Dutch ship Eendracht, (Note: Although the ship is fictional, Eendracht, meaning "Concord" or "Unity" was a common name for Dutch ships, taken from the motto of the Dutch Republic: Concordia res parvae crescunt) and which is, in Hornblower's estimation, "the ugliest and least desirable two-decker in the Navy List".

He is assigned to serve under Rear Admiral Leighton, Lady Barbara Wellesley's new husband. Throughout, Hornblower is torn between his love for Lady Barbara and his sense of duty and loyalty to his frumpy wife, Maria. His feelings for Maria are complicated by the previous loss of both of his children to smallpox.

Hornblower's first orders are to escort a convoy of East Indiamen off the Spanish coast. He successfully fights off simultaneous attack on the convoy by two fast, manoeuvrable privateer luggers. Since he has been forced to sail with an understrength crew, and had to make do with "lubbers, sheepstealers, and bigamists", he breaks Admiralty regulations and presses twenty sailors from each Indiaman just before they part company. With his ship now at full complement, Hornblower wreaks havoc on the French-occupied Spanish coast. He captures a French brig, the Amelie, by surprise, storms a French fort and takes several more vessels in its harbour as prizes, repeatedly fires upon several thousand Italian soldiers marching along a coastal road, and saves his Admiral's ship from certain ruin by towing it away from a French battery during a severe storm.

When Hornblower encounters a squadron of four French ships of the line that have broken through the English blockade of Toulon, he attacks them despite the odds of four to one, and manages to disable or heavily damage all of them. However, with many of his crew killed or wounded, including Bush, who loses a leg, and his ship dismasted, he is then forced to strike his colours and surrender. This novel ends as a cliffhanger.
