= Flying Colours (novel) =

Horatio Hornblower novel by C. S. Forester

- First edition
- Author: C. S. Forester
- Language: English
- Series: Horatio Hornblower
- Genre: Historical novel
- Publisher: Michael Joseph, London
- Publication date: 1938
- Publication place: United Kingdom
- Media type: Hardcover & paperback
- Pages: 190 pp
- Preceded by: A Ship of the Line (1938)
- Followed by: The Commodore (1945)

Flying Colours is a Horatio Hornblower novel by C. S. Forester, originally published 1938 as the third in the series, but now eighth by internal chronology. It describes the adventures of Hornblower and his companions escaping from imprisonment in Napoleonic France and returning to England. It is one of three Hornblower novels adapted into the 1951 British-American film Captain Horatio Hornblower R.N..

== Plot summary ==
At the end of the previous novel, A Ship of the Line, after attacking and severely damaging a superior French squadron with HMS Sutherland, Hornblower had to surrender his ship to the French. He and his surviving crew are imprisoned in the French-occupied Spanish fortress of Rosas on the Mediterranean Sea. From the walls of Rosas, Hornblower witnesses an English raid leading to the final destruction of the French ships he immobilised.

Soon afterwards, Hornblower is told that he is to be sent to Paris to be tried as a pirate for his previous actions, including the capture of a battery and some coastal vessels using a ruse of war. Hornblower, his first lieutenant, Bush, who is still recovering from the loss of a foot in the fighting, and his coxswain, Brown, are taken away in a carriage by an Imperial aide-de-camp.

The carriage becomes stuck in a snowstorm on a minor road close to the river Loire, and part of the escort leaves to get help from Nevers, the next town. Hornblower and Brown overpower the remaining guards and steal a small boat on the river. Taking Bush with them, they set out downstream, but the river is in spate, and the boat eventually capsizes in some rapids. Hornblower and Brown carry Bush towards the nearest building, which happens to be the Chateau de Graçay. The Comte de Graçay, a member of the old French nobility who has lost three sons in Napoleon's wars, and his widowed daughter-in-law Marie, welcome them and protect them from the authorities, who eventually abandon the search thinking them drowned.

The party spends the winter as guests of the Comte and prepare for an escape in late spring. During these months, Bush recovers and learns to walk with a wooden leg. Hornblower, Bush and Brown build a new boat to continue their voyage downstream. Meanwhile, Hornblower and Marie have a short but intense love affair.

Springtime comes and the river is in perfect condition for travel. Disguised as a fishing party, the escapees make their way to the port city of Nantes. There, they change their disguise to that of high-ranking Dutch customs officers in French service, using uniforms made for them by Marie and the staff of the Chateau. They manage to recapture the cutter Witch of Endor, taken as a French prize the year before. Manning it with a prison work gang, they take the ship out of the harbour and rendezvous with the British blockading fleet.

Here, Hornblower learns that his wife Maria had died in childbed; his son, Richard, survived and was adopted by his friend Lady Barbara, widow of Admiral Leighton and sister of Arthur Wellesley, the future Duke of Wellington.

Returning to Portsmouth, Hornblower, in common with any other captain who has lost his ship, faces a court martial for the loss of the Sutherland. However, he is 'most honourably' acquitted by the court and finds himself a celebrity for his exploits in the Mediterranean and his daring escape from France. He is received by the Prince Regent (the later King George IV), who makes him a knight of the Order of the Bath and a Colonel of Marines (a sinecure providing worthy officers with extra income). Together with the money from prizes taken while he was captain of the Sutherland and from his recapture of the Witch of Endor, he is finally financially secure and free to court and marry Lady Barbara.
