= Payment Deferred =

1926 crime novel by C.S. Forester

- First edition
- Author: C.S. Forester
- Language: English
- Genre: Crime fiction
- Set in: London
- Publisher: Bodley Head
- Publication date: 1926
- Publication place: England
- Media type: Print
- Pages: 304
- OCLC: 19049835

Payment Deferred is a crime novel by C.S. Forester, first published in 1926.

William Marble is a bank clerk living in south London with a wife, Annie, and two teenage children, Winifred ('Winnie') and John, desperately worried about money. One evening without warning they are visited by his recently orphaned and very rich young nephew, James Medland, who has a large amount of cash on him. Unable to resist the opportunity put in his way, William Marble sends his wife to bed early that night, saying that he wants to talk business and suggests she pleads a headache so as not to seem unsociable. He then slips poison in his nephew's drink, killing him, and William buries him in the back garden under cover of darkness that night.

Some lucky foreign-currency speculation with his ill-gotten gains brings William Marble untold fortune. Annie assumes at first that her husband was given or lent the money by James, and she says that now they can afford it, she wants them to move to a better house with an attractive garden. He is unable to move for fear of anyone discovering the terrible secret, hardly dares to leave the premises for fear that somebody will disturb the garden, and his character is transformed by what he has done.

Eventually Annie stumbles on the truth, but feeling that her husband still loves her, despite their dreary life together, she keeps her own counsel. But when she also finds that her husband has been having an affair with a local dressmaker who is really only interested in him because of his money, she is in despair. John returns home early from a family holiday one day, and discovers his father and his father's lover in a compromising position. In a state of shock he rides off on his motorcycle, crashing it and killing himself. Winnie has been sent to a better girls' school, becomes increasingly haughty and impatient with her parents, and walks out on them after a bitter argument. With nothing to live for, Annie falls ill with influenza, and becomes resigned to death. When nature does not take its course, she commits suicide by drinking the same poison that William used to murder his nephew. The doctor calls in the police, and the fate William has so long dreaded comes to pass when he is put on trial and hanged for her murder.

The novel was made into a 1931 Broadway play and a 1932 film, both starring Charles Laughton as William Marble. The character of John is written out of both play and film. A three-part radio adaptation of Payment Deferred, Plain Murder and The Pursued, adapted by Paul Mendelson and directed and produced by David Neville, was first broadcast on BBC Radio 4 in April 2014, most recently repeated on Radio 4 Extra in March 2019.
