= Payment Deferred (film) =

1932 film

- Lobby card
- Directed by: Lothar Mendes
- Screenplay by: Ernest Vajda; Claudine West
- Based on: Payment Deferred; 1931 play by Jeffrey Dell Payment Deferred; 1926 novel by C. S. Forester
- Starring: Charles Laughton; Maureen O'Sullivan; Dorothy Peterson; Verree Teasdale
- Cinematography: Merritt B. Gerstad
- Edited by: Frank Sullivan
- Music by: William Axt
- Production company: Metro-Goldwyn-Mayer
- Distributed by: Loew's Inc.
- Release date: November 7, 1932
- Running time: 81 minutes
- Country: United States
- Language: English
- Budget: $197,000
- Box office: $304,000

Payment Deferred is a 1932 American pre-Code crime drama film directed by Lothar Mendes and starring Charles Laughton, Maureen O'Sullivan and Dorothy Peterson. Laughton portrays a man so desperate for money, he resorts to murder. It was based on the 1931 play of the same name by Jeffrey Dell, which was in turn based on the 1926 novel of the same name by C. S. Forester. Laughton also played the lead role in the play, which opened on Broadway on September 30, 1931 and ran for 70 performances.

== Plot ==
London bank clerk William Marble is deeply in debt. When his boss learns of a lawsuit for an overdue bill, he warns Marble that he will be dismissed if he cannot settle the matter quickly. The same day, a co-worker provides Marble with a currency-market tip that could solve all his financial troubles if only he had any money to speculate with.

Then Marble is visited by a rich nephew from Australia whom he has not seen in many years, James Medland. All evening, Marble tries to convince Medland to lend him the necessary money, either to share in the currency profits or as a simple loan; but the increasingly uncomfortable Medland is not interested. Driven to desperation, Marble offers him a glass of whisky laced with some cyanide that he bought for developing photographs, and under cover of darkness buries his body in the back yard.

Marble uses the large amount of cash that the dead man was carrying to speculate on margin based on the tip he received, and makes £30,000, enough that he can immediately retire. However, fear of his crime being discovered makes him consistently nervous and irritable. He rejects any suggestion of moving to a more expensive home; he buys books about crime and poisons and keeps rereading a page about cyanide. His wife Annie knows something is wrong, but assumes he has embezzled from the bank. To relieve his nervous tension, he sends Annie and their daughter Winnie away on a three-week vacation. While they are gone, local shopowner Rita Collins seduces Marble into an affair so she can borrow £300 from him. Winnie returns a day early and discovers Collins in the house, but keeps quiet about it.

Despite their new financial wealth, troubles continue to grow for the Marble family. Annie sees a small newspaper advertisement asking about Medland's whereabouts, and notices how the book falls open to the page about cyanide. Glancing at her husband's bottle of cyanide, she realises what he has done, but stands by him. Meanwhile, Winnie becomes something of a snob, consorting with a higher social class of people and sneering at her parents. When she runs away one night, Annie chases after her in the rain and becomes very ill. However, under Marble's loving care, she begins to recover. Then Collins shows up and blackmails Marble for another £500. Annie overhears, learns about the affair, and commits suicide with some more of the same cyanide used on Medland.

After Marble is convicted for her murder, a tearful Winnie visits him in his cell on the day of his execution, he reassures her that he did not kill Annie, but says that he is nonetheless at peace with his fate. He is convinced he is paying a bill that was only deferred.

== Cast ==
- Charles Laughton as William Marble
- Maureen O'Sullivan as Winnie Marble
- Dorothy Peterson as Annie Marble
- Verree Teasdale as Marguerita (Rita) Collins
- Ray Milland as James Medland
- Billy Bevan as Charlie Hammond
- Halliwell Hobbes as Prospective Tenant
- William Stack as A Doctor
- Ethel Griffies as Customer in Madame Collins' Dress Shop
- Crauford Kent as Broker
- Doris Lloyd as Woman Exchanging Foreign Currency in Bank
- C. Montague Shaw as Mr. Edwards
- Carl Stockdale as Jailer
- Harry Stubbs as Mr. Evans

== Production ==
In the original novel, William and Annie also have a son John, who does not appear in the play or film.

== Box office ==
The film grossed a total (domestic and foreign) of $304,000: $169,000 from the US and Canada and $135,000 elsewhere resulting in a loss of $32,000.

== Preservation status ==
On December 14, 2011, Turner Classic Movies aired a print of this film which restored the five cuts in the film made for the 1939 re-release to satisfy the Production Code. Some local censorship boards had objected to the use of the word "cyanide" in its original 1932 release.
