= Captain Horatio Hornblower =

1951 film by Raoul Walsh

- Theatrical release poster
- Directed by: Raoul Walsh
- Screenplay by: C. S. Forester; Ivan Goff; Ben Roberts; Æneas MacKenzie
- Based on: Horatio Hornblower; 1939 novel by C. S. Forester
- Produced by: Gerry Mitchell
- Starring: Gregory Peck; Virginia Mayo
- Cinematography: Guy Green
- Edited by: Jack Harris
- Music by: Robert Farnon
- Production company: Warner Bros. Pictures
- Distributed by: Warner Bros. Pictures
- Release date: 10 April 1951
- Running time: 117 minutes
- Country: United Kingdom
- Language: English
- Budget: $2,462,000
- Box office: $5,333,000

Captain Horatio Hornblower is a 1951 naval swashbuckling war film produced in Technicolor in Great Britain by Warner Bros. Pictures, and starring Gregory Peck and Virginia Mayo. Directed by Raoul Walsh, the film is based on three of C. S. Forester's Horatio Hornblower novels: The Happy Return (also known as Beat to Quarters; 1937), A Ship of the Line (1938), and Flying Colours (1938). Forester is credited with the screen adaptation.

== Plot ==
In 1807, during the Napoleonic Wars, Royal Navy Captain Horatio Hornblower, in command of the 38-gun frigate HMS Lydia, is tasked with a secret mission to the Pacific coast of Central America. There he is to provide arms and support to the insurrectionist Don Julian Alvarado, who has organized a rebellion against the colonial authorities of Spain, an ally of Britain's enemy France. Alvarado proves to be a megalomaniac calling himself "El Supremo" ("The Almighty"). Hornblower learns that a much more powerful warship, the 60-gun Natividad, is en route to suppress the rebellion. When it anchors nearby, Hornblower and his crew board and capture it in a surprise night attack. He then reluctantly surrenders the ship to Alvarado, and they go their separate ways.

A Spanish lugger then delivers news that Spain has switched sides, which means Hornblower must deal with Alvarado. Two passengers board the Lydia, over Hornblower's strenuous objections: Lady Barbara Wellesley and her maid, fleeing a yellow fever epidemic. As Lady Barbara is the (fictitious) sister of Arthur Wellesley, 1st Duke of Wellington, Hornblower cannot refuse her request for passage to England.

Using superior seamanship and tactics, Hornblower sinks the much more powerful Natividad, killing Alvarado. When the Lydia's surgeon is killed during the battle, Lady Barbara insists on tending the wounded. She falls gravely ill, and Hornblower nurses her back to health. On the voyage home, they fall in love. However, when she reveals her feelings, Hornblower confesses that he is married. Though she promises her maid's discretion, he avers that they are not free.

After arriving home, Hornblower learns that his wife has died in childbirth, leaving him an infant son. Later, he is given command of the Sutherland, a 74-gun ship of the line captured from the French and is assigned to a squadron commanded by the antagonistic Admiral Leighton. Just returned from her honeymoon with Leighton, Lady Barbara tells Hornblower that she did not learn of his wife's death until too late. Leighton's squadron is ordered to help enforce the British blockade of France.

Hornblower learns that four French Navy ships of the line have broken through the blockade. Leighton assumes they will make for the Mediterranean, but Hornblower suggests that they intend to support Napoleon's campaign on the Iberian Peninsula. Leighton decides to cover both possibilities by detaching one ship to patrol the French coast. When he learns that Hornblower's Sutherland is best suited for the task, having the shallowest draught, he accuses Hornblower of pursuing glory and prize money and gives him strict orders not to engage the French without first summoning the rest of the squadron.

Hornblower's French-built ship is mistaken for a friendly vessel by a small French brig, which flies the enemy's recognition signal. After capturing the vessel, Hornblower learns from its captain that the four ships plan to sail to Spain. In violation of his orders, Hornblower uses a French flag, the recognition signal, and Sutherland's design, to enter the protected harbor where the French ships are anchored. His gun crews dismast all four ships before cannon fire from the fort forces Hornblower to scuttle his ship in the channel, bottling up the harbor. He and his crew are taken captive.

Before the rest of the British squadron can arrive, Hornblower and his first officer, Bush, are taken to Paris for trial and execution. They and Sutherland coxswain Quist escape and make their way to Nantes, where they overpower French-allied Dutch guards to hijack the captured British Witch of Endor. With a crew of British prisoners of war, they sail to England.

Hornblower is hailed as a national hero, and learns that Leighton was killed in the attack on the French squadron. Returning home to visit his young son, he finds Lady Barbara there, and the two embrace.

== Cast ==
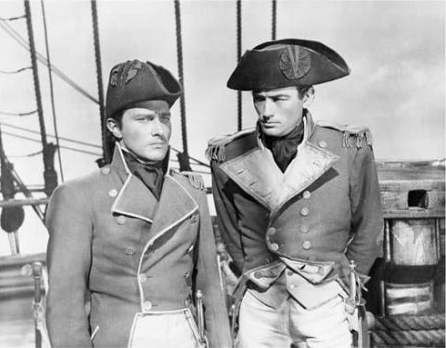
Publicity photo of Terence Morgan & Gregory Peck taken for film.

- Gregory Peck as Captain Horatio Hornblower, R.N.
- Virginia Mayo as Lady Barbara Wellesley
- Robert Beatty as First Lieutenant William Bush
- Terence Morgan as Second Lieutenant Gerard
- Moultrie Kelsall as Third Lieutenant Crystal
- James Kenney as Midshipman Longley
- James Robertson Justice as Quist
- Denis O'Dea as Rear Admiral Sir Rodney Leighton
- Richard Hearne as Polwheal
- Michael J. Dolan as Surgeon Gundarson
- Stanley Baker as Mr. Harrison
- Alec Mango as El Supremo/Don Julian Alvarado
- Christopher Lee as the Spanish captain of the Natividad
- Diane Cilento as the voice of Maria, Hornblower's wife
- Alan Tilvern as Admiral Don Jose Hernandez
- John Witty as Captain Entenza
- Anthony Marlowe as Captain Bolton

=== Casting ===
Warner Bros. Pictures acquired the film rights to the first three Hornblower novels – The Happy Return, A Ship of the Line, and Flying Colours – as a star vehicle for Errol Flynn when they were first published. For reasons that may have included the financial failure of the 1948 Adventures of Don Juan, the growing difficulties of working with the actor, and/or his advancing age, Flynn was not cast. Warner's was already building up Burt Lancaster as their new swashbuckling screen star, but the role of a British sea captain seemed to be outside his range, so Peck was ultimately cast on a loan-out from David O. Selznick, who received screen credit in the opening titles. Virginia Mayo was only cast after a number of high-profile British actresses were either not free or not interested. Peck's personal choice was Margaret Leighton. Studio head Jack Warner found Virginia Mayo more attractive.

== Production ==
The film was shot at studios inside the United Kingdom, on Mermaid Street in Rye, East Sussex, at HMS Victory and also on location in France. El Supremo's Fortress is Fort de Brégançon in France. To save costs, the Hispaniola set from the 1950 Disney film adaptation of Treasure Island was reused as the frigate HMS Lydia. Instead of moving the horizon background in order to simulate being at sea, the ship itself was rocked. This caused many problems because of the combined weight of ship, crew, and equipment. The Italian brigantine Marcel B. Surdo represented the Witch of Endor for all at-sea exterior footage. The Marcel B. Surdo would also appear in such seafaring films as The Crimson Pirate, The Master of Ballantrae, and John Paul Jones. The explosive and fire effects were supervised by Cliff Richardson.

== Release and reception ==
=== Premieres ===
The film had its worldwide premiere in the presence of Princess Margaret at the Warner Theatre, Leicester Square, London, on 12 April 1951. The event was in support of King George's Fund for Sailors and the "Foudroyant" appeal (the presently restored frigate renamed HMS Trincomalee afloat in the Historic Quay, Hartlepool, UK).

The US premiere was at Radio City Music Hall.

=== Box office ===
According to Warner Bros' accounts, the film earned $2,598,000 in the U.S. and $2,735,000 elsewhere. It was the studio's most expensive film of the year but also their most popular. It was the 9th most popular film at the British box office that year.

=== Critical reception ===
Bosley Crowther, critic for The New York Times, said it has "plenty of action ... It may be conventional action, routine in pattern and obviously contrived, with less flavor [of the books] in it than of the workshops of Hollywood. However, it should please those mateys who like the boom of the cannon and the swish of the swords." Bob Thomas said it "is excellent adventure stuff ... the dialogue and action can be stilted at times. But there is enough eye-catching excitement and color to offset that." TV Guide wrote that "Walsh's direction has no time to linger. Guy Green's camerawork and Robert Farnon's jolly score are helpful."

The film has been well received by modern critics. The film review aggregator website Rotten Tomatoes gives it 7.3 out of 10 and a 100% "fresh" rating.

=== Home media ===
On March 6, 2007, Warner Home Video released the film on DVD in its original aspect ratio of 1.37:1. The DVD release includes the audio of a one-hour Lux Radio Theater program broadcast on 21 January 1952, in which Peck and Mayo reprised their roles.
