= The Ship (novel) =

1943 novel by C. S. Forester

- First edition
- Author: C. S. Forester
- Cover artist: A. E. Barlow
- Publisher: Michael Joseph
- Publication date: 1943
- Publication place: United Kingdom
- Pages: 256 (paperback); 193 (hardback)

The Ship is a morale-booster propaganda novel written by British author C. S. Forester set in the Mediterranean during World War II, and first published in May 1943. It follows the life of a Royal Navy light cruiser for a single action, including a detailed analysis of many of the men on board and the contribution they made.

== Plot ==
A vital convoy is heading to Malta, escorted by five Royal Navy light cruisers, including HMS Artemis. It is afternoon, and Artemis, commanded by Captain Troughton-Harrington-Yorke, has just beaten off a number of air attacks. An Italian surface fleet, with the battleships San Martino and Legnano and several light cruisers, will intercept it soon. The convoy must get through, so the British ships must fight. The crew, from the command level officers on the bridge down to the ordinary seamen in the lower decks, prepares for the coming confrontation, while part of them is also occupied with their own, very colourful lives.

Upon receiving reports from the lookouts at the masthead of enemy ships ahead, the cruisers lay a smoke screen, then attack. The ship sustains two hits, the first of which kills the ship's surgeon and several other crewmembers, while the second one does more damage to the ship and requires the flooding of "X" gun turret aft. The other two turrets continue to fire upon the Italian fleet, while destroyers make a torpedo attack. A single shell, whose history from the mining of the ores to the firing of the gun is described in detail, hits the Italian flagship and strikes the final blow to the morale of the enemy commanders. With the San Martino being hit by a torpedo, the Italian fleet retires as night falls, and the convoy continues for Malta.

The captain remains on the bridge, more determined than ever to continue "the long struggle of sea power against tyranny", which so many naval commanders fought before him.

== Characters ==
=== HMS Artemis crew ===
- Captain the Honourable Miles Ernest Troughton-Harrington-Yorke – Commanding Officer
- Commander James Hipkin Rhodes – Executive Officer
- Paymaster Commander George Brown – Paymaster
- Lieutenant(E) Charles Norton Bastwick - Senior engineer
- Paymaster Sub-Lieutenant James Jerningham – Captain's secretary
- Commissioned Gunner Kaile – in charge of the ship's Admiralty Fire Control Table
- Chief Petty Officer Patrick O’Flaherty - Gunnery director
- Able Seaman Dawkins – Helmsman
- Able Seaman A. B. Presteign – a member of the gun crew
- Ordinary Seaman Harold Quimsby – Masthead lookout
- Ordinary Seaman Albert Whipple - Masthead lookout
- Ordinary Seaman Triggs – stationed in the magazine

=== Enemies ===
- Vice-Ammiraglio Gasparo Gaetano Nocentini, Italian Navy
- Kapitän zur See Helmuth von Bödicke, German Navy
- Korvettenkapitän Klein – Bödicke's translator
- Luogotenente Lorenzetti – Nocentini's translator

== Structure ==
The novel is divided into twenty-six short chapters, and describes a very short period of time - from 11.30 a.m. to nightfall on a single day. The narrative interweaves the stories of the men aboard, from the Paymaster Commander to the Captain to the gun crew that fires the shot that changed the course of history, with chapter headings that come from the Captain's official after-action report.

== Background ==
The author dedicated the book "with the deepest respect to the officers and crew of HMS Penelope", and the action described is based on the Second Battle of Sirte. Forester had been invited to a mission aboard that vessel by the Admiralty earlier. Less than a year after the book was published, the Penelope was torpedoed by a German submarine and sank with more than half her crew.
