= Hornblower and the Atropos =

Historical novel by C.S. Forester

- First edition cover
- Author: C. S. Forester
- Language: English
- Series: Horatio Hornblower
- Genre: Historical novel
- Publisher: Michael Joseph
- Publication date: 1953
- Publication place: United Kingdom
- Media type: Hardcover & paperback
- Pages: 285 pp
- Preceded by: Hornblower and the Crisis (1967)
- Followed by: The Happy Return (1937)

Hornblower and the Atropos is a 1953 historical novel by C.S. Forester.

Horatio Hornblower is posted to HMS Atropos, the smallest vessel in the Royal Navy that merits command by a post-captain, as he salvages treasure from the Mediterranean Sea.

== Plot summary ==
On a December day in 1805, Hornblower travels with his very pregnant wife and their son to London on a canal boat via the Thames and Severn Canal and the Thames. He is excited about getting his new orders and obtaining his first command as a post-captain. On the canal, the assistant boatman becomes incapacitated through drink, thus allowing Hornblower the opportunity to learn much of canal boat operation when he volunteers to take the man's place at the boat's helm.

Upon their arrival in London, Hornblower assumes command of the Atropos, a 22-gun sloop. His first assignment is a unique one: to organise Admiral Horatio Nelson's funeral. The Battle of Trafalgar had just taken place, in which Nelson was shot and killed by a musket. The whole nation is in deep mourning and all eyes are on the funeral. The funeral consists of a procession on the Thames between Greenwich Pier and Whitehall Steps, during which the ceremonial barge conveying Nelson's coffin springs a leak. The crew, after frantic bailing, barely manage to unload the coffin without disrupting the proceedings noticeably.

Once Hornblower finishes with the funeral, he is presented to the King at Court. He is informed that the King's nephew, a German prince driven out of his principality by Napoleon, is to be one of his midshipmen on the Atropos. Hornblower's treatment of the prince is a continuing subplot.

Hornblower is then sent to collect from Gibraltar three Sinhalese pearl divers and their quarrelsome salvage master to recover treasure from a sunken British ship, the Speedwell, which went down in Marmorice Bay in Turkey carrying a fortune in silver and gold – the pay chests of the British Army in Egypt. Hornblower is given the salvage operation. The Turks are already aware of the presence of the gold, and in the weeks Atropos is present in Marmorice become aware of the supposedly secret recovery operation. They bring a Turkish warship into the bay, and man a previously deserted fort, trapping Atropos. When the Turks demand all the money Hornblower has so far recovered, he puts them off until the following morning. In the middle of the night, he makes a daring escape by an extremely perilous route, avoiding both ship and fort, and outsmarting the Turks.

Following Hornblower's delivery of the treasure at Gibraltar, he helps capture a Spanish ship, the Castilla, and makes his way into a Sicilian port for repairs. He does such a fine job that his ship attracts the notice of the King of The Two Sicilies. The British government transfers the vessel to the Sicilian navy in return for the King's allegiance. Hornblower makes his way back to England, only to find both of his children mortally ill with smallpox.

== Inconsistencies ==
Other books in the series refer to Hornblower capturing the Castilla as a lieutenant, but he is a captain in this book, which actually describes the battle. Confusingly, the obscure short story "The Hand of Destiny" (1940) also describes an entirely different action featuring Lieutenant Hornblower capturing the Castilla. Forester, apparently, would retcon Hornblower's history, overwriting the events of his short stories in subsequent novel-length works. "The fact that he discouraged the re-publication of the short stories is an indicator that he gave the novels' events preference. Also, in this book it is mentioned that Hornblower is presented to King George III for the first time. However, In "Flying Colours" Hornblower mentioned to Frere that he was presented at court in "'98". 1798 should be somewhere in between being prisoner at Ferrol and sailing with "Renown" to the Caribbean, (see "Lieutenant Hornblower")".
