= The Commodore (Forester novel) =

1945 book by C. S. Forester

- First edition cover
- Author: C. S. Forester
- Language: English
- Series: Horatio Hornblower
- Genre: Historical novel
- Publisher: Michael Joseph
- Publication date: 1945
- Publication place: United Kingdom
- Media type: Print (hardback & paperback)
- Pages: 272 pp
- ISBN: 0-14-001116-1
- OCLC: 16550230
- Preceded by: Flying Colours (1938)
- Followed by: Lord Hornblower (1946)

The Commodore (published 1945) is a Horatio Hornblower novel written by C. S. Forester. It was published in the United States under the title Commodore Hornblower.

== Plot summary ==
Having achieved fame and financial security, Captain Sir Horatio Hornblower has married Lady Barbara Leighton (née Wellesley) and is preparing to settle down to unaccustomed life as the squire of Smallbridge in Kent. He still yearns to serve at sea and accepts with alacrity when the Admiralty appoints him a commodore, puts him in command of a squadron and sends him on a diplomatic and military mission to the Baltic. His primary aim is to bring Russia into the war against Napoleon.

Hornblower is shown dealing with the problems of squadron command, and using naval mortars (carried on special ships known as bomb vessels) to destroy a French privateer. This leads to the French invasion of Swedish Pomerania. Later his squadron calls at Kronstadt, where he meets with Russian officials, including Tsar Alexander I, who is favourably impressed by Hornblower and his squadron. Hornblower narrowly averts a major diplomatic incident when his secretary and interpreter (a Finnish refugee assigned to him by the Admiralty) attempts to assassinate the Tsar at a court function.

After Russia enters the war, Hornblower's squadron takes an important role in the defence of Riga, which is besieged by French forces. The bomb vessels again take an important role, and so do amphibious operations under the protection of the squadron.

At the end of the novel, the French and Prussian troops abandon the siege and retreat. Hornblower accompanies the pursuing Russian forces until they meet the Prussian army, which has halted to form a rearguard. Hornblower meets with the Prussian general – Ludwig Yorck von Wartenburg – and persuades him to change sides.

At this point it becomes clear to the accompanying Brown that Hornblower is gravely ill, apparently with typhus. In some editions of the novel the story ends here with the hallucinating Hornblower imagining himself being greeted in Hampton Court by Lady Barbara and his infant son. Forester however provided an additional chapter in which the convalescent Hornblower returns safely to Smallbridge in time for Christmas.

During the siege and pursuit, Carl von Clausewitz, a German officer in Russian service, who is later to become famous as a military theorist and writer, is a character.

== Discussion ==
The novel was first published as a serial in The Saturday Evening Post, and occasioned controversy with Hornblower in an implied sexual encounter with a married Russian Countess as the Post's first adulterers. As Forester says in his Hornblower Companion, "...it really caused quite a flutter". Forester wanted to give Hornblower the opportunity to catch typhus, although he does comment that he believes that Hornblower caught typhus during the siege rather than in bed.

The historical accuracy of this book is limited: Forester later wrote that he did not know what British naval forces, if any, were engaged at the siege of Riga. (Historically they were commanded by Thomas Byam Martin.) The technical detail of the bomb vessels is incorrect in almost every respect. British bomb vessels had not been ketch-rigged since the 1780s; the mortars were crewed not by the bomb-vessels' officers and men but by specialist detachments of the Royal Marine Artillery; and many other points. Ivan Essen is presented as the governor of Riga throughout the campaign, but he was actually replaced by Filippo Paulucci delle Roncole a few months before victory was achieved. Also Hornblower is given a pair of percussion cap pistols by his wife (one is stolen by his secretary in to use in his attempted assassination of the Tsar). This is anachronistic as the percussion cap was not invented until 1822.

The date of publication (1945) reveals Forester's preoccupation in The Commodore—he parallels the political situation with that in the Second World War. In both cases, Russia was originally allied with a continental dictator (Hitler/Napoleon) but changed sides after being treacherously invaded. In both cases, Sweden remained neutral and traded with both sides. Russia similarly occupied other Baltic territories (Estonia, Latvia and Lithuania) raising doubts about the correct response among the British government. In The Commodore (but not in the real Napoleonic period), as in the Second World War, the Royal Navy offered substantial help to Russia: at the siege of Riga, and by guarding the Arctic convoys. Less obviously, Forester draws parallels between the early 19th century and his own time in one or two of the other Hornblower novels.

== Ships ==
=== Hornblower's squadron ===
- HMS Nonsuch, 74-gun, Hornblower's flagship commanded by Captain Bush (Hornblower's former first lieutenant).
- HMS Lotus, a sloop, commanded by Commander Vickery.
- HMS Raven, a sloop, commanded by Commander Cole.
- HMS Harvey, a bomb ketch, commanded by Lieutenant Mound.
- HMS Moth, a bomb ketch, commanded by Lieutenant Duncan.
- HMS Clam, a cutter, commanded by Lieutenant Freeman.

=== Others ===
- Blanchefleur, a French privateer corvette

== See also ==
- Commodore (rank)
