= HMS Sutherland =

Three ships of the Royal Navy have borne the name HMS Sutherland:

- HMS Sutherland was a fourth rate of 54 guns launched in 1704 as HMS Reserve. She served as a hospital ship in the Mediterranean 1741, and was condemned in 1744. She was broken up in 1754.
- HMS Sutherland (1741) was a 50-gun fourth rate launched in 1741 and sold in 1770.
- HMS Sutherland (F81) is a Type 23 frigate launched in 1996 and on active service as of 2017.

== Fictional ship ==
HMS Sutherland also is the name of a fictional, Dutch-built, 74-gun ship of the line that appears in the Horatio Hornblower novels.

== Battle honours ==
Ships named Sutherland have earned the following battle honours:

- Louisburg 1758
- Quebec 1759
- Martinique 1762
- Havana 1762
