= The Last Encounter =

- Short story by C. S. Forester
- Country: United Kingdom
- Language: English
- Genre: Historical short story

Publication
- Publisher: Sunday Mirror
- Media type: Print (newspaper)
- Publication date: 1966
- Series: Horatio Hornblower

"The Last Encounter" is a short story by C. S. Forester which provides the final chapter in the life of his fictional naval hero Horatio Hornblower. It first appeared in the 8 May 1966 Sunday Mirror. The following year it was published together with the unfinished novel Hornblower and the Crisis and another short story, "Hornblower and the Widow McCool".

== Plot summary ==
In 1848, Hornblower, now 72, is enjoying a comfortable retirement on his country estate at Smallbridge, Kent. Recently promoted to the well-paid but honorary rank of Admiral of the Fleet, he reflects that life as a country gentleman is pleasant and secure but dull. Hornblower remains married to Lady Barbara, and his sailor-servant Brown still attends him, although now as a butler. The fear of financial insecurity that has haunted Hornblower throughout his career is now lifted and he is now able to consider further subsidising his son Richard's expenses as a colonel in the Guards.

Late one stormy night, a well-dressed Frenchman, claiming to be Napoleon, arrives at the front door of Hornblower's mansion. Perceived by Hornblower as speaking a mix of sanity and nonsense, the visitor had been travelling by rail to Dover to take ship for France. However a landslip has delayed the train near Smallbridge Park, and he is urgently seeking assistance to complete his journey. Barbara is favourably impressed with the man's charming manners and persuades her husband to provide a carriage, although Hornblower remains convinced that the Frenchman is a lunatic.

A month later, the Hornblowers learn that the man is Prince Louis Napoleon Bonaparte, nephew of Napoleon I, and the future Emperor Napoleon III. He was on his way to Paris to contest the office of President of France. After winning the election, the Prince-President confers on Hornblower the insignia of a Chevalier of the Legion of Honour and sends a sapphire to Barbara in gratitude for their timely aid.

== Publication ==
John Forester (son of C. S. Forester) recorded meeting with his father, then resident in Berkeley, California, on 7 August 1964. C. S. Forester confided that he had written the concluding Hornblower story but that it was under secure storage: "locked in my publisher's vault as a legacy to my wife and sons". John Forester confirmed that this was "The Last Encounter", subsequently published in May 1966 following his father's death the previous month.
