= The Happy Return =

1937 historical novel by C. S. Forester

- First edition cover
- Author: C. S. Forester
- Language: English
- Series: Horatio Hornblower
- Genre: Historical novel
- Publisher: Michael Joseph, London
- Publication date: 4 February 1937
- Publication place: United Kingdom
- Media type: Hardcover & paperback
- Pages: 287 pp
- OCLC: 752876668
- LC Class: PZ3.F75956 Hap PR6011.O56
- Preceded by: Hornblower and the Atropos (1953)
- Followed by: A Ship of the Line (1938)

The Happy Return (Beat to Quarters in the US) is the first of the Horatio Hornblower novels by C. S. Forester. It was published in 1937. The American title is derived from the expression "beat to quarters", which was the signal to prepare for combat. This book is sixth by internal chronology of the series (including the unfinished Hornblower and the Crisis). Hornblower's past history as described here does not entirely accord with his history as revealed in the stories written later, but Forester never revised the book.

It is one of three Hornblower novels adapted for the British-American film Captain Horatio Hornblower R.N., released in 1951.

== Plot summary ==
In June 1808, Captain Horatio Hornblower is in command of the 36-gun frigate HMS Lydia, with secret orders to sail to the Pacific coast of Nicaragua (near modern Choluteca, Choluteca) and supply a prominent landowner, Don Julian Alvarado ("descendant" of Pedro de Alvarado by a fictional marriage to a daughter of Moctezuma), with muskets and powder for a planned uprising against the Spanish authorities. Upon meeting Don Julian, Hornblower discovers that he is a megalomaniac who calls himself "El Supremo" (which Forester translates as "the Almighty"), views himself as a deity, and has been killing those who he regards as "unenlightened" because they do not recognise El Supremo's divine status.

While Hornblower replenishes his supplies, the 50-gun Spanish warship Natividad is sighted off the coast. Unwilling to risk fighting the much more powerful ship in a sea battle, Hornblower hides the Lydia behind an island at the entrance to the bay, and captures the Natividad as it enters the bay, in a surprise nighttime boarding. El Supremo demands that it be turned over to him so that he may have a navy. After hiding the captured Spanish officers to save them from being murdered by El Supremo, Hornblower honours the request. Off the coast of Panama he encounters a Spanish mail lugger, from which an envoy arrives to inform him of a new alliance between Spain and England against Napoleon.

When Hornblower visits Panama City to meet with the Spanish Viceroy, the Englishwoman Lady Barbara Wellesley, a (fictional) sister of Marquess Wellesley and Sir Arthur Wellesley (the future Duke of Wellington), comes aboard. The packet ship she was on in the Caribbean had been captured some time before. Freed when Spain changed sides, and fleeing a yellow fever epidemic ashore, she requests passage back to England. Hornblower reluctantly takes Lady Barbara and her maid Hebe aboard, warning her that he must first hunt and destroy the Natividad before El Supremo can capture a Spanish ship carrying funds crucial to the Spanish war effort from Manila to Acapulco.

In the subsequent battle Hornblower uses masterful tactics to sink the Natividad, though the Lydia herself is heavily damaged. Limping back to Panama to effect repairs, Hornblower is informed that, now that there is no further threat from the Natividad, he is not welcome in any Spanish American port. He manages to find a natural harbour on the island of Coiba, where he refits.

After completing repairs, Hornblower encounters the haughty Spanish envoy once again on the same lugger. He is invited aboard the lugger and finds El Supremo chained to the deck on his way to execution.

Hornblower sets sail for England. On the long voyage home he and Lady Barbara become strongly attracted to each other. She makes the first overt advances and they embrace passionately, but Barbara's maid Hebe walking in on them brings Hornblower to the realisation that a ship's captain must not indulge in sexual dalliance with a passenger. He tells Barbara, truthfully, that he is married. After being rejected, Barbara avoids him as best she can. The Lydia arrives at Saint Helena soon afterwards and Lady Barbara transfers to a more spacious ship.

== Historical References ==
The El Supremo character was inspired by a contemporary dictator of Paraguay, José Gaspar Rodríguez de Francia (1766-1840). His official title was "Supreme and Perpetual Dictator of Paraguay", but he was popularly known as El Supremo.
