= Lieutenant Hornblower =

1952 novel by C. S. Forester

- First edition
- Author: C. S. Forester
- Cover artist: Val Biro
- Language: English
- Series: Horatio Hornblower
- Genre: Historical novel
- Publisher: Michael Joseph, London
- Publication date: 1952
- Publication place: United Kingdom
- Media type: Print (Hardback & Paperback)
- Pages: 253
- ISBN: 1859989764
- OCLC: 22239426
- Preceded by: Mr. Midshipman Hornblower (1950)
- Followed by: Hornblower and the Hotspur (1962)
- Text: Lieutenant Hornblower online

Lieutenant Hornblower (published 1952) is a Horatio Hornblower novel written by C. S. Forester. It is the second book in the series chronologically, but the seventh by order of publication.

The book is unique in the series in being told not from Horatio Hornblower's point of view, but rather from Bush's. This helped Forester to explain Hornblower's unsuitable first marriage besides giving an objective view of Hornblower himself. This unusual narrative perspective also allows Forester to sustain a mystery, advanced hint by hint in the course of the novel, about how Captain Sawyer came to be injured—an event possibly witnessed by Hornblower.

== Plot summary ==
William Bush, who becomes Hornblower's faithful companion and best friend, is introduced boarding HMS Renown as the third lieutenant. Hornblower is the fifth and most junior lieutenant. It is quickly apparent that Captain James Sawyer suffers from paranoia, constantly suspecting plots to undermine his authority and inflicting irrational and arbitrary punishments upon Hornblower and the other officers. A young volunteer named Wellard suffers particularly badly. Four of the lieutenants meet in secret in the lower decks to discuss what can be done, but are interrupted when Wellard warns them that the captain is on his way to arrest "mutineers". The officers scatter. Then they learn that the captain has fallen head-first into the hold.

When the captain regains consciousness, he has entirely lost his reason due to the fall, and is incapable of resuming command. Buckland, the first lieutenant, takes charge. Ordered to capture an anchorage from which Spanish privateers are operating, he organises a clumsy frontal attack, which is repulsed. Hornblower suggests a surprise attack at night. Bush leads the successful attack, but it is Hornblower who is instrumental in negotiating the unconditional surrender of the remaining Spanish forces.

The Spanish base at Samaná is destroyed, a Spanish privateer and some small craft are captured and Buckland's promotion seems assured. Unfortunately for him, the Spanish prisoners seize control of the Renown during the night, taking Buckland prisoner while he is asleep in his cot. Hornblower alertly retakes the ship, but in the desperate fighting, Bush is severely wounded and the helpless Sawyer is killed.

Upon their return to port, there is an awkward court of enquiry. Hornblower repeatedly denies any knowledge of how Captain Sawyer came to fall into the hold. Anxious to protect Sawyer's reputation, the court convicts no one, but Buckland is passed over, and Hornblower is promoted to commander.

Unfortunately, the Peace of Amiens (1802) is signed before Hornblower's promotion can be confirmed, and he is restored to the rank of lieutenant. Moreover, the demotion is retroactive, so he must gradually repay the additional money he had received as commander. Reduced to poverty, he ekes out a living by playing whist for a modest stipend (plus whatever he wins or loses) at an upper-class gaming establishment. He resides in a lodging house, where he meets his future first wife Maria (née Mason), the daughter of the landlady. Bush meets him several times, and notes in a newspaper that Midshipman Wellard, a suspect in Sawyer's fall into the hold, has drowned in an accident.

The Peace of Amiens comes to an end in 1803. War has not yet begun, but is imminent, as evinced by a press gang Hornblower and Bush encounter. Hornblower's promotion is confirmed (by a Lord of the Admiralty he impresses with his exceptional cardplaying skills) and he is appointed commander of a sloop-of-war.

== Television adaptation ==
This novel provides the material for episodes 5 and 6 of the Hornblower series of television films, which concern the voyage of the Renown and the subsequent enquiry, and for some scenes at the beginning of episode 7.
