= Lord Hornblower =

1946 novel by C. S. Forester

- First edition
- Author: C. S. Forester
- Language: English
- Series: Horatio Hornblower
- Genre: Historical novel
- Publisher: Michael Joseph, London
- Publication date: 1946
- Publication place: United Kingdom
- Media type: Print (Hardback & Paperback)
- Pages: 224 pp
- OCLC: 16481131
- Preceded by: The Commodore (Commodore Hornblower) (1945)
- Followed by: Hornblower in the West Indies (1958)
- Text: Lord Hornblower online

Lord Hornblower (published 1946) is a Horatio Hornblower novel written by C. S. Forester, originally intended to be the last in the series.

Hornblower is tasked with suppressing a mutiny on board a Royal Navy ship. He succeeds, and with reinforcements captures Le Havre. There follow several adventures and a disastrous affair in France, with Hornblower's eventual repatriation and reconciliation with his wife.

== Background ==
Forester wrote the final chapter of the novel while on board a U.S. battleship.

== Plot summary ==
In 1814, Hornblower is delegated to deal with the Flame, a brig full of mutineers off the French coast, near the mouth of the Seine. It is a tricky situation because the mutineers' demands cannot be met, but they have threatened that if a Royal Navy force tries to force their hand, they will slip into a nearby French port.

Hornblower alters the appearance of his own vessel, the Porta Coeli, so it can masquerade as the mutinous vessel. As dusk falls, he follows a valuable blockade runner into port, pretending to be the Flame. Then, once the two vessels are moored, he captures it and takes it out to sea. He then pursues the Flame, which retreats to the French port. Believing the mutineers responsible, the French send four gunboats to take her. Hornblower manages to exploit the fighting to capture both the Flame and a gunboat.

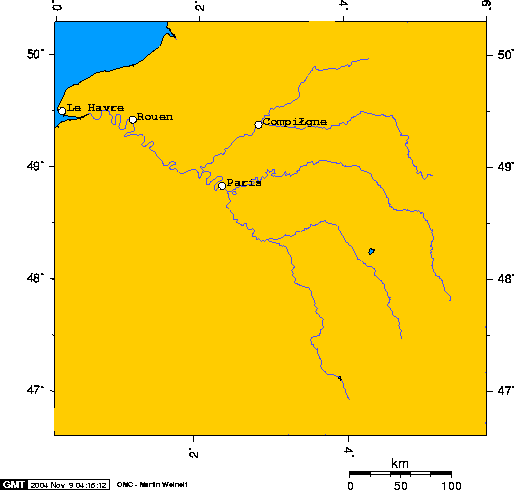
Seine River

Among the French prisoners is Lebrun, the young and ambitious assistant to the mayor of Le Havre. Lebrun asks to speak with Hornblower privately; he proposes to surrender Le Havre to the English fleet. Hornblower and Lebrun arrange a plan: Lebrun's role is to undermine those parties who would resist a British seizure of the city. Overcoming some tense moments with audacity, Hornblower is able to capture the city with a half battalion of Royal Marines and finds himself its military governor.

Hornblower finds his new duties different from that of commanding a naval vessel or squadron. He finds his role demanding, in part because he is such a demanding perfectionist. The Duke of Angoulême, one of the heirs to the Bourbon dynasty, is sent to assume control of the civil leadership.

Hornblower hears that Napoleon has been able to amass a strong force, to be transported by barge down the Seine to retake Le Havre. He sends a force, borne by half a dozen large ship's boats, to try to blow up the barges and ammunition. He puts his best friend, Captain William Bush, in command. The raid is a success and the French force is stopped, but an unexpected explosion kills most of the British, including Bush.

Hornblower is raised to the peerage, possibly in part to provide him with more dignity, gravitas, when dealing with the French heir's entourage, as well to reward him for his accomplishments.

During the following peace, Hornblower's wife Barbara accompanies her brother, the Duke of Wellington, to the Congress of Vienna, leaving Hornblower at loose ends. He decides to visit the Comte de Graçay, where he resumes his relationship with the Comte's widowed daughter-in-law, Marie. When Napoleon escapes from Elba and raises a new army, Hornblower, the Comte and Marie lead a guerrilla fight against the Imperial forces. They are eventually defeated, and Marie dies from a leg wound. Hornblower and the Comte are captured and condemned to death, but news of the Emperor's defeat at the Battle of Waterloo arrives just in time to save their lives.
