= Hornblower and the Crisis =

1967 novel by C. S. Forester

Hornblower and The Crisis
- First edition
- Author: C. S. Forester
- Language: English
- Series: Horatio Hornblower
- Genre: Historical novel
- Publisher: Michael Joseph
- Publication date: 1967
- Publication place: United Kingdom
- Media type: Hardcover & paperback
- Pages: 158 pp
- OCLC: 16499816
- Preceded by: Hornblower and the Hotspur (1962)
- Followed by: Hornblower and the Atropos

Hornblower and the Crisis is a 1967 historical novel by C. S. Forester. It forms part of the Horatio Hornblower series, and as a result of Forester's death in 1966, it was left unfinished. There is a one-page summary of the last several chapters of the book found on the final page, taken from notes left behind from the author. It was the eleventh and last book of the series to be published, but it is fourth in chronological sequence.

== Plot summary ==
Hornblower has just finished his tour blockading Brest in command of the Royal Navy sloop Hotspur. As he travels back to England for his next assignment (and his promised elevation to post rank), he is asked to participate in the court martial of Hotspur's new captain. Hotspur ran aground and was lost the day after Hornblower turned over command.

Following the court martial, the Hotspur's officers, now without a ship, travel back to England with Hornblower in a supply ship. On the way, they are pursued by a French brig, which they board and disable. During the battle, Hornblower finds important papers in the French captain's cabin. Back in England, he travels to the Admiralty with the documents. He arrives at the same time as the disappointing news that the French fleet under Admiral Pierre-Charles Villeneuve has escaped into Ferrol, Spain after an indecisive engagement.

Hornblower presents a daring plan to the first and second secretaries to the Admiralty - William Marsden and John Barrow. He proposes sending agents to Spain, posing as messengers, to deliver false orders from Napoleon Bonaparte to Villeneuve. These will command Villeneuve to take his fleet out of their safe harbour of Ferrol and so bring about a decisive engagement with Admiral Nelson. This plan has been made possible because the papers captured by Hornblower include a routine letter from Napoleon, whose form can be copied.

The plan is authorized. The Reverent Doctor Claudius - a disgraced clergyman and expert forger - is recruited to create the false letter from Napoleon. He was in prison awaiting execution for fraud and agrees to assist in exchange for a reprieve. The unfinished book stops at the point where Hornblower is persuaded to attempt the mission himself. Notes left by Forester indicate that Hornblower would carry out the mission accompanied by South American revolutionary Francisco de Miranda, with Hornblower posing as his servant. They deliver the false orders to Villeneuve without arousing suspicion, prompting him to take his fleet to sea; this ultimately leads the destruction of the Franco–Spanish fleet at the Battle of Trafalgar.

This book also includes two short-stories, "Hornblower and the Widow McCool" (a.k.a. "Hornblower’s Temptation"), set early in Hornblower's career, and "The Last Encounter", set in 1848 when he is living on his country estate in old age and retirement.

== Continuation ==
Forester never finished the book, which, while chronologically located in the middle of the Hornblower's series, was written last and interrupted by Forester's death. However, several other writers have written conclusions, notable efforts being the fanfiction of Adrian Taylor, published in the form of several short stories in several issues of Reflections, the newsletter of the C. S. Forester Society (from issue 5 in 2003 to issue 10 in 2005); a book by Bob Smith, published in 2010 as C S Forester's Hornblower & the Crisis. A novel finished by R W Smith; and another book, The Jamaican Affair by John Mahon, published in 2012. Out of those, Mahon's book has been authorized by the Forester's estate.
