= Mr. Midshipman Hornblower =

1950 novel by C. S. Forester

- First edition cover
- Author: C. S. Forester
- Language: English
- Series: Horatio Hornblower
- Genre: Historical novels
- Publisher: Michael Joseph, London
- Publication date: 1950
- Publication place: United Kingdom
- Media type: Paperback
- Pages: 253 pp
- OCLC: 39459179
- Dewey Decimal: 823/.912 21
- LC Class: PR6011.O56 M7 1998
- Preceded by: –
- Followed by: Lieutenant Hornblower (1952)

Mr. Midshipman Hornblower is a 1950 Horatio Hornblower novel written by C. S. Forester. Although it may be considered as the first episode in the Hornblower saga, it was written as a prequel; the first Hornblower novel, The Happy Return ("Beat to Quarters" in the U.S.), was published in 1937.

== Plot introduction ==
Horatio Hornblower commences his career in the Royal Navy as an inexperienced midshipman in January 1794. Through a series of challenges and adventures both in and out of combat, Hornblower discovers a natural talent for leadership, and earns the respect of many who had previously thought him to be a slow-witted dullard.

== Plot summary ==
This novel is episodic, with named chapters (US editions begin each chapter title with "Hornblower") that often focus on a self-contained incident.

=== The Even Chance ===
A gawky and seasick Hornblower comes aboard his first ship. He immediately earns the contempt of the other midshipmen. The young Hornblower is particularly despised by a midshipman named Simpson. Simpson, at age thirty-three, had failed his examination for lieutenant too many times to ever expect promotion. He takes out his bitterness and disappointment on his juniors. Hornblower is extremely unhappy. He takes the first opportunity for a way out, one way or another, by challenging Simpson to a duel. Hornblower insists on having one of the two pistols loaded and the other not, and to exchange shots at point-blank range, with neither Hornblower nor Simpson knowing which is which. The captain secretly frustrates this by having the officers of the duel load neither weapon and claiming a misfire when neither discharges. The captain later has him transferred to the frigate HMS Indefatigable.

=== The Cargo of Rice ===
Transferred aboard Indefatigable, Midshipman Hornblower is put in command of the French ship Marie Galante, carrying a cargo of rice from New Orleans, by order of Captain Pellew after it is taken as a prize. It is Hornblower's first time in command of a ship since joining the Royal Navy. He is instructed to take the captured French ship and her crew to a British port where he is to report for his next orders. Sailing is relatively smooth for Hornblower and his four seamen, until one of the crew (Matthews) informs him that the ship is taking on water from somewhere. Hornblower recalls that Marie Galante was struck below the hull's waterline by a cannonball from Indefatigable before her capture. They check for moisture but find none until it is pointed out that the dried rice will absorb all of it. They hastily attempt to patch the hole with a sail, but by then the rice has expanded so much that the ship is breaking apart. A massive attempt to jettison the rice comes too late and Hornblower commands all hands to abandon ship. Hornblower's crew and the French prisoners are left at sea in an open boat.

=== The Penalty of Failure ===
In The Penalty of Failure, Hornblower and his crew are still out at sea, between British and French ports. The captain of the recently sunk Marie Galante pleads with Hornblower to navigate to France and release him and his men, and promises safe passage for Hornblower and his crew. Hornblower promptly rejects the Captain's pleading in spite of their bleak situation and uses his pistols to prevent a mutiny. Not long afterward, Hornblower and his crew are caught by a privateer named Pique which was converted from a slave ship. This ship is commanded by Captain Neuville. Hornblower is now a prisoner of war, but Indefatigable falls in with them and makes chase. As Pique is the faster sailer, Hornblower devises a plan to slow her down: he sets a fire, which soon spreads to the very flammable paint locker. All hands are diverted to fighting the fire, which soon breaks out on the deck and spreads to the rigging, immediately slowing the vessel. The British ship ultimately overpowers Pique, extinguishes the fire, and Captain Neuville and his crew surrender. Hornblower's fears of reprimand for losing Marie Galante are quickly extinguished by the offhanded dismissal of the incident by Captain Pellew. However, instead of taking credit for the fire, Hornblower suggests that there may have been spontaneous combustion in the paint locker, as a way of punishing himself for losing Marie Galante in the first place.

=== The Man Who Felt Queer ===
Upon returning to Indefatigable, Hornblower is assigned a role of loosening the sail by Captain Pellew in his plan to take the French corvette Papillon. Hornblower is set to command Indefatigable's jolly boat. Before setting out, Hornblower practises his task on Indefatigable to try and calm his nerves. While reviewing his men prior to shoving off, a man named Hales says to Hornblower that he feels queer. After the boat crews depart, Hales begins having a seizure. Because silence was essential and was the only thing keeping the men alive, Hornblower strikes Hales and inevitably kills him. On boarding the ship Hornblower and his men are frustrated by the absence of a footrope along the yardarm. Hornblower's fear of heights terrifies him, but tries to assure himself that he was courageous in his situation with Hales. Motivated by this act of emotional self-flagellation Hornblower runs unaided along the yardarm and looses the topsail. During the fighting the jolly boat is lost, with Hales still aboard, but Papillon is taken as a prize of Indefatigable. Hornblower feels bad about the loss of Hales, without whom Hornblower believes he would never have found the courage to complete his task. Jackson claims that Hales would have never made a decent seaman anyway. Given the success of their mission Hornblower realises the loss of the jolly boat will not be held against him, but still regrets the inevitable death of Hales.

=== The Man Who Saw God ===
When Styles, a man in Hornblower's division, appears strangely marked with "boils" all over his face, Hornblower is suspicious. He gains a clue from Finch, another of his men, who has delusions and claims that "God's in the maintop, but the Devil's in the cable tier, but only in the dog watches". After thinking about what this means, Hornblower investigates the cable-tier in the dog-watch and discovers a group of men "rat fighting". Styles without use of his hands has to kill rats with his teeth, while the others bet. A horrified Hornblower, having gathered up his courage, orders them up on deck and threatens to report them. Later, in action against a French ship, Hornblower and Finch are firing a swivel gun from the mizzen-top when the mast is hit and begins to fall. Hornblower persuades Finch to jump to safety by telling him to "get to God". The two men make a desperate jump to safety.

=== The Frogs and the Lobsters ===
Hornblower takes part in the attempted invasion of France by British and French Royalist forces at Quiberon in order to support the failed Revolt in the Vendée. Hornblower is ordered ashore with his seamen acting as gunners, and gains his first experience of land warfare and the horrors of the Revolution, including the guillotine. The expedition ends in failure and Hornblower escapes back to his ship, saddened, but philosophical. The Frogs are the French and the Lobsters are the (red-coated) British regiment landed to support them.

=== The Spanish Galleys ===
Hornblower's ship, Indefatigable, is in Cádiz when Spain makes peace with France. Since Spain becomes officially neutral, the British ship of war is forced to leave, passing prisoner-rowed galleys still maintained by the conservative Spanish navy. Spain has completed its political turnaround and joined France in an alliance by the time Indefatigable is escorting another ship through the Straits of Gibraltar. When there is a lack of wind and the ships are becalmed, two Spanish galleys ambush them. The galleys are fought off and Hornblower, in command of the jolly boat, helps capture one of them, which gains him promotion to Acting-Lieutenant. Hornblower subsequently attributes the "fighting madness" with which he and his sailors attack the Spanish to an irrational hatred of the galleys.

=== The Examination for Lieutenant ===
After Indefatigable comes into port at Gibraltar, Acting-Lieutenant Hornblower reports to Santa Barbara where he and others are to take their examination for lieutenant. When asked a question by one of the captains conducting the examination, Hornblower freezes up and is about to fail the exam when an alarm of cannon fire interrupts the examination; fire ships have been sent by the enemy in an attempt to destroy the British ships at Gibraltar. Hornblower and Captain Foster, one of the examining captains, take heroic action and prevent a disaster for the British, and jump in the water. They are rescued by the crew of one of the fire ships, themselves escaping in a small boat, but then a British guard boat captures them in return. Since the Spanish crew saved his and Hornblower's life, Foster orders that they be released. The examining board does not reassemble since Foster falls out with another examining captain, who had been standing by with a boat but failed to reach them before the Spanish crew. Hornblower will need to wait for a later examining board. The chapter ends with Foster, impressed by Hornblower's actions, telling Hornblower that, since the attack prevented him from failing the examination, he should "Be thankful for small mercies. And even more thankful for big ones."

=== Noah's Ark ===
Acting-Lieutenant Hornblower accompanies the diplomat Mr. Tapling to buy cattle and grain from the Bey of Oran to resupply the fleet. However, an outbreak of the bubonic plague in the city forces Hornblower, Tapling and his boat-crew to take refuge aboard the transport ship Caroline and remain in quarantine for three weeks until they are clear of infection. Hornblower struggles with a tiny crew aboard a worn-out ship, but still manages to take a prize in the shape of an unsuspecting privateer lugger, and deliver the supply ship to the fleet's base at Gibraltar. There he is reprimanded by the Victualling Officer for having allowed his crew to feast on fresh beef over the last three weeks.

=== The Duchess and the Devil ===
Hornblower is given command of the French prize Le Reve and ordered to return to England with dispatches and, to his astonishment, a passenger – the Duchess of Wharfedale. In thick fog Hornblower sails his ship directly into the middle of a Spanish fleet off Cape St. Vincent. Anticipating capture Hornblower prepares to throw his dispatches overboard, but is persuaded by the Duchess, who also reveals her true identity as a popular actress, to allow her to conceal them under her clothes, as she is sure to be repatriated immediately. This he does. Much later, while in a Spanish prison at Ferrol, he receives a letter from her detailing her successful return to England, and another from the Admiralty confirming his promotion to lieutenant. Later, while on parole Hornblower rescues some sailors from a Spanish ship wrecked on the cliffs below him. After the rescue, he and his assistants, some Spanish fishermen, are forced out to sea by bad weather and found by another British frigate. Despite the temptation to stay aboard, Hornblower reminds the captain that he has given his parole and is returned to Spain under a flag of truce. Several months later, in recognition of his bravery, the Spanish authorities release him.

== Translations ==
Mr. Midshipman Hornblower was translated into German by Hanns-Georg Sommerwerck as Fähnrich Hornblower in 1952, and into French by Maurice Beerblock as M. l'aspirant de marine Horatio Hornblower in 1953. The book was also translated into Norwegian by Odd Feydt Midshipman Hornblower and Polish by Henryka Stępień "Pan midszypmen Hornblower".

== Adaptations ==
Four of the episodes form the basis for the first four instalments of the series of TV films Hornblower which were released both in the US and the UK, sometimes with alternate titles. Starring Ioan Gruffudd in the title role, they are :

- The Even Chance (aka, The Duel) (also includes material from "The Cargo of Rice", "The Man Who Felt Queer" and "The Man Who Saw God")
- The Examination for Lieutenant (aka, The Fire Ships) (also includes material from "Noah's Ark")
- The Duchess and the Devil
- The Frogs and the Lobsters (aka, The Wrong War)
