= Horatio Hornblower =

Protagonist of C. S. Forester's novels

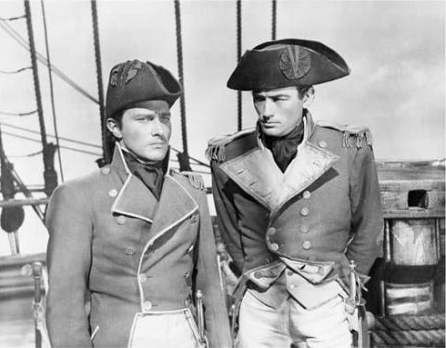
- Gregory Peck (right) as Horatio Hornblower
- First appearance: The Happy Return (1937)
- Last appearance: "The Last Encounter" (1967)
- Created by: C. S. Forester
- Portrayed by: Gregory Peck; David Buck; Michael Redgrave; Ioan Gruffudd

In-universe information
- Nicknames: Horry (by his first wife); Horny (by his shipmates)
- Gender: Male
- Occupation: Naval officer
- Spouses: Maria Mason (†); Lady Barbara Wellesley
- Children: Horatio Hornblower Jr. (†); Maria Hornblower (†); Richard Hornblower
- Nationality: British

Horatio Hornblower is a fictional officer in the British Royal Navy during the Napoleonic Wars, the protagonist of a series of novels and stories by C. S. Forester. He later became the subject of films and radio and television programmes, and C. Northcote Parkinson elaborated a "biography" of him, The True Story of Horatio Hornblower.

Forester's series about Hornblower tales began with the novel The Happy Return (US title: Beat to Quarters), published in 1937. Herein, Hornblower is a captain on a secret mission to Central America in 1808. Later stories fill out his career, starting with his unpromising beginning as a seasick midshipman. As the Napoleonic Wars progress, he steadily gains promotion as a result of his skill and daring, despite his initial poverty and lack of influential friends. After surviving many adventures in a wide variety of locales, he rises to become admiral of the fleet.

== Inspirations ==
Forester's original inspiration was an old copy of the Naval Chronicle that described the effective dates of the Treaty of Ghent. Two countries could be at war in one part of the world after a peace was obtained months before in another part because of the time required to communicate around the world. The burdens that this placed on captains far from home led Forester to invent a character struggling with the stresses of a "man alone".

Many parallels exist between Hornblower and real naval officers of the period, notably Admiral Lord Horatio Nelson, Sir George Cockburn, Lord Cochrane, Sir Edward Pellew, Jeremiah Coghlan, Sir James Gordon, and Sir William Hoste. The actions of the Royal Navy at the time, documented in official reports and in the Naval Chronicle, provided much of the material for Hornblower's fictional adventures.

The name "Horatio" was inspired by the character in William Shakespeare's Hamlet and chosen also because of its association with contemporary figures such as Nelson. The surname "Hornblower" comes from Arthur Hornblow, a Hollywood producer who was a colleague and friend of Forester's.

Frederick Marryat has been identified as "the father of the seafaring adventure novel from which all others followed, from C. S. Forester's Horatio Hornblower to Patrick O'Brian's Jack Aubrey and Stephen Maturin". Hornblower and the eponymous protagonist of Marryat's novel Peter Simple both start their careers rather unpromisingly and without influential friends, but advance through hard work, honesty, and bravery. Both fight duels before their careers have properly started and both are taken prisoner early in their careers.

== Characteristics ==
Hornblower is courageous and intelligent, and a skilled seaman, but he is burdened by intense reserve, introspection, and self-doubt, and is described as "unhappy and lonely". Despite numerous personal feats of immense skill and cunning, he belittles his own achievements by numerous rationalisations, remembering only his fears. He consistently ignores or is unaware of the admiration in which he is held by his fellow sailors. He regards himself as cowardly, dishonest, and at times, disloyal, never crediting his ability to persevere, think rapidly, organise, or cut to the heart of a matter. His sense of duty, his hard work, and his drive to succeed make these imagined negative characteristics undetectable by everyone but him. He frets obsessively over petty failures that reinforce his poor self-image. His introverted nature and incredibly high standards isolate him from the people around him, including his closest friend, William Bush, with whom he is frequently foul-tempered. He is guarded with almost everyone, unless the matter is the business of discharging his duty as a king's officer, when he is clear and decisive.

Hornblower possesses a highly developed sense of duty, refusing to put personal benefit in the way of the best interests of his service and his country. This is frequently misinterpreted by those around him as either modesty or false humility, though he often fails to recognise that the possibility of personal benefit existed until it is pointed out to him in retrospect. On occasion, however, he is able to set his duty aside, usually in order to show loyalty to someone he respects. For example, in Hornblower and the Hotspur, he contrives an escape for his personal steward who would otherwise have been hanged for striking a superior officer. Hornblower is philosophically opposed to flogging and capital punishment, and is pained when circumstances or the Articles of War force him to impose such sentences.

He suffers from seasickness at the start of each of his voyages. As a midshipman, he becomes seasick at the sheltered roadstead of Spithead. He is tone-deaf and finds music an incomprehensible irritant; in a scene in Hornblower and the Hotspur, he is unable to recognise the British national anthem.

A voracious reader, he can provide discourse on both contemporary and classical literature. His skill at mathematics makes him both an adept navigator and a talented whist player. He uses his ability at whist to supplement his income during a poverty-stricken period of inactivity. Due to time spent as a prisoner of war early in his career, he is fluent in both French and Spanish, which frequently proves useful in when fighting ships of those nationalities.

== Analysis and reception ==
With Hornblower, C. S. Forester is credited with inventing the naval historical novel. Stephanie Jones called Hornblower "the most renowned sailor in contemporary fiction".

Igor Webb noted that Forester intended for the books to be read by adults, but they have become popular among adolescents as well.

Forester wrote the Hornblower series to avoid entanglements with real-world history. Hornblower is always off on another mission when a great naval victory occurs during the Napoleonic Wars. Similarly during the War of 1812 he was never in a battle with Americans.

== Fictional biography ==
=== Youth ===
Hornblower is born in Kent, the son of a physician. He has no inherited wealth or influential connections who can advance his career. In The Happy Return, the first novel published, Hornblower's age is given as 37 in July 1808, implying a birth year of 1770 or 1771. However, when Forester decided to write about Hornblower's early career in the sixth novel Mr Midshipman Hornblower, he made his hero about five years younger, giving his birth date as 4 July 1776, the date of the adoption of the United States Declaration of Independence. This adjustment allows Hornblower to begin his career in wartime. He is given a classical education, and by the time he joins the Royal Navy, at the age of 17, he is well versed in Greek and Latin. He is tutored in French by a penniless French émigré and has an aptitude for mathematics, which serves him well as a navigator.

=== Early career ===
Hornblower's early exploits are many and varied. He joins the Royal Navy as a midshipman, where he is bullied and tries to resolve the matter by forcing a duel with his tormentor. He is then transferred to HMS Indefatigable under Edward Pellew and distinguishes himself. He fends off fire ships, which interrupt his (failed) first examination for promotion to lieutenant. He is given command of the sloop Le Rêve while still only an acting lieutenant; the vessel blunders into a Spanish fleet in the fog, resulting in Hornblower's capture and imprisonment in Ferrol. During his captivity, he acquires a fluent knowledge of both Galician and Spanish, and is finally confirmed as a commissioned lieutenant. He leads a daring rescue of Spanish crewmen from a shipwreck during a storm, which leads to his being picked up by a British warship patrolling offshore; since he had given his Spanish captors his parole that he would not escape, though, he insists upon being returned to captivity. The Spanish release him for his bravery.

As a junior lieutenant, he serves in HMS Renown under Captain Sawyer, whose bouts of paranoia on a mission to the Caribbean strain discipline to breaking point. On this voyage, he begins his long friendship with William Bush, at the time his senior in rank. Due to his exploits, Hornblower is made commander, but his promotion is not confirmed when he returns to England following the Peace of Amiens. This causes him great financial distress; he has to repay the difference between a commander's pay and a lieutenant's from his meagre half-pay. He uses his skill at whist to supplement his income, playing for money with admirals and other distinguished men in an officers' club.

==== HMS Hotspur ====
In 1803, renewed hostilities against France seem imminent, and Hornblower is confirmed in the rank of commander, and appointed captain of the sloop-of-war HMS Hotspur. Before sailing, he marries Maria, the daughter of his landlady, despite his doubts about the match. Maria dotes upon the irritable Hornblower in ways that he finds vexing; she annoys him with both her ignorance and hero-worship of him. However, he warms to her over the course of several books and becomes a good (though not perfect) husband to her and father to their two children, Horatio and Maria.

After gruelling service during the blockade of Brest aboard Hotspur, he is promised a promotion to Post-captain by Commander-in-Chief William Cornwallis and is recalled to England. He meets the Secretary of the Admiralty and the rank is conferred when Hornblower agrees to take part in a dangerous mission he himself has suggested—delivering forged letters to Admiral Villeneuve that lead the French fleet to sortie, leading to the British victory at Trafalgar.

==== HMS Atropos ====
Following this exploit, Hornblower is given command of the sixth-rate ship HMS Atropos. His first task is to organise Nelson's funeral procession along the River Thames and he has to deal with the near-sinking of the barge conveying the hero's coffin.

Atropos is ordered to join the British Mediterranean fleet. Hornblower is sent on a secret mission to recover gold and silver from a sunken British transport on the bottom of Marmorice Bay within the Ottoman Empire with the aid of pearl divers from Ceylon. The operation is successful, though Hornblower has a narrow escape from a Turkish warship intent on capturing the gold.

After unloading the treasure at Gibraltar, Atropos and another British warship capture a large Spanish frigate after a desperate battle. In the friendly port of Palermo, Hornblower oversees the repairs of the battle damage, but just as this work is finished, the ship is given to the King of the Two Sicilies to keep him as an ally. Returning to England, Hornblower finds his two young children dying of smallpox.

==== HMS Lydia ====
Later in the timeline, but written of in the first novel in order of publication, he makes a long, difficult voyage in command of the frigate HMS Lydia round the Horn to the Pacific, where his mission is to support a megalomaniac, El Supremo, in his rebellion against the Spanish. He captures Natividad, a much more powerful Spanish ship, but reluctantly has to cede it to El Supremo to placate him. When he finds that the Spanish have switched sides in the interim, he is forced to find and sink the ship he had captured—adding injury to insult, as he had given up the prize money to maintain the uneasy alliance with the madman.

Hornblower also takes on an important passenger in Panama, Lady Barbara Wellesley, the fictional younger sister of Sir Arthur Wellesley (later to become the Duke of Wellington). He is at first nettled and infuriated by her forthright and outspoken manner, her ability to see easily through his reserve, and the great social gap between them. Over time, however, her beauty, strength, and intelligence win his heart, and the two become dangerously attracted to each other. Before things get out of hand, Hornblower informs Lady Barbara that he is married. She leaves the Lydia two days later when they rendezvous with other British ships. Hornblower fears for his career, having offended "the daughter of an earl, the sister of a marquis".

=== HMS Sutherland ===
After these exploits, he is given command of HMS Sutherland, a 74-gun ship of the line. His feelings are disturbed during this period by the fact that his commander, Admiral Leighton, has recently married Lady Barbara. The admiral treats Hornblower with disdain.

While waiting at his Mediterranean rendezvous point for the rest of his squadron—and its commander—to arrive, he carries out a series of raids against the French along the south coast of Spain, earning the nickname "the terror of the Mediterranean". After saving Admiral Leighton's flagship, HMS Pluto, which had become dismasted in stormy seas, from the French battery at Rosas, he learns that a French squadron of four ships of the line has slipped the blockade at Toulon. He decides that his duty requires that he fight them at one-to-four odds to prevent them from entering a well-protected harbour. In the process, his ship is crippled, and with two-thirds of the crew incapacitated (including Lt. Bush), he surrenders to the French, but not before severely crippling three of the French ships and damaging the fourth. As a prisoner in Rosas, he witnesses the destruction of the French ships at anchor by Leighton's squadron.

He is sent with his coxswain, Brown, and his injured first lieutenant, Bush, to Paris for a show trial and execution on charges of piracy for using a false flag to enter a French-held harbour despite him raising the British ensign before opening fire. During the journey, Hornblower and his companions escape. After a winter sojourn at the chateau of the Comte de Graçay, during which he has an affair with the nobleman's widowed daughter-in-law, the escapees travel down the River Loire to the coastal city of Nantes. There, he recaptures a Royal Navy cutter, the Witch of Endor, mans the vessel with a commandeered gang of galley prisoners, and escapes to the Channel Fleet.

As an indication of Admiralty approval of Hornblower's actions, Lt. Bush is promoted into Witch of Endor as commander, and shortly thereafter to post captain, with "the dockyard job at Sheerness waiting for [him]."

When Hornblower arrives home, he discovers that his first wife Maria has died in childbirth, that the baby boy survives, and that Lady Barbara (now widowed after Admiral Leighton died of wounds sustained during the attack on Rosas that Hornblower had observed as a prisoner) has taken charge of the child, with her brothers Lords Wellesley and Wellington acting as godfathers.

Hornblower faces a mandatory court-martial for the loss of the Sutherland, but is "most honourably acquitted." A national hero in the eyes of the public and a useful propaganda tool for various politicians and the Prince Regent, he is made a Knight of the Order of the Bath and appointed a Colonel of Marines (a sinecure which confers a salary without any additional duties).

Hornblower and Lady Barbara are now free (after a decent interval) to marry. They move to the fictional village of Smallbridge, Kent, where Hornblower has purchased an estate. However, the new lord of the manor longs for the sea.

=== Flag officer ===
A return to duty comes when he is appointed to be commodore and sent with a squadron of small craft on a mission to the Baltic Sea, where he must be a diplomat as much as an officer. He foils an assassination attempt on Tsar Alexander I of Russia and is influential in the monarch's decision to resist the French invasion of the Russian Empire. While at the court of the tsar, it is implied that he is unfaithful to Barbara, dallying with a young Russian noblewoman. He provides assistance in the siege of Riga, employing his bomb ketches against the French army, where he meets General Carl von Clausewitz of the Prussian Army.

Sick with typhus, he returns to England. Upon his recovery, he is tasked with dealing with mutineers off the coast of France. After tricking the French into attacking the mutinous ship, he rounds up the rebels, personally shooting their ringleader as he tries to escape. When he is approached by a French official willing to negotiate the surrender of a major port, he seizes the opportunity and engineers the return of the Bourbons to France. He is rewarded by being created a peer as Baron Hornblower of Smallbridge in the County of Kent. However, his satisfaction is marred by the death in action of his friend, Bush.

When Napoleon returns from exile at the start of the Hundred Days, Hornblower is staying at the estate of the Comte de Graçay. While there, he renews his affair with Marie de Graçay. When the French Army goes over to Napoleon en masse, Hornblower, the Count, and his family choose to fight rather than flee to Britain. He leads a Royalist guerrilla force, and causes the returned Emperor's forces much grief before his band is finally cornered; in a desperate shootout, Marie is slain, and Hornblower is captured. After a brusque hearing before a military tribunal, the Count and he are both sentenced to death, but he is granted a stay of execution and ultimately released due to Napoleon's defeat at the Battle of Waterloo.

After several years ashore, he is promoted to rear admiral and appointed naval Commander-in-Chief of the West Indies. He foils an attempt by veterans of Napoleon's Imperial Guard to free Napoleon from his captivity on Saint Helena, captures a slave ship, and encounters Simón Bolívar's army. He also discovers a plot by Lady Barbara to engineer the escape of a Marine bandsman sentenced to death for a minor offence. He overlooks her breach of the law and reassures her of his love. While attempting to return to England, the Hornblowers are caught in a hurricane, and Horatio saves Barbara's life from the storm. In a moment of terror and desperation, she reveals that she never loved her first husband, only him. Hornblower retires to Kent and eventually becomes Admiral of the Fleet.

His final achievement occurs at his home, when he assists a seemingly mad man claiming to be Napoleon to travel to France. That person turns out to be Louis Napoleon Bonaparte, the nephew of Hornblower's great nemesis and the future president and later emperor of France. For his assistance, Lord Hornblower is created a Chevalier of the Legion of Honour.

At the end of his long career, Hornblower is wealthy, famous, and contented, a beloved, indulgent husband and father, and finally free of the insecurities and self-loathing that had driven him throughout his life.

Forester provides two different brief summaries of Hornblower's career. The first was in the first chapter of The Happy Return, which was the first Hornblower novel written. The second occurs midway through The Commodore, when Tsar Alexander asks him to describe his career. The two accounts are incompatible. The first account would have made Hornblower about five years older than the second. The second account is more nearly compatible with the rest of Hornblower's career, but it omits the time he spent as a commander in Hornblower and the Hotspur. There are other discrepancies as well; in one account of his defeat of a Spanish frigate in the Mediterranean, he distinguished himself as lieutenant and in another he is a post-captain with less than three years' seniority. In The Happy Return, Bush is serving with Hornblower for the first time, but other books in the series set earlier in his career completely disregard that. It appears that these discrepancies arose as the series matured and accounts needed to be modified to coincide with his age and career.

=== Parkinson's biography ===
C. Northcote Parkinson wrote a fictional biography of Hornblower with the encouragement of C. S. Forester's widow, detailing his career and personal information. It corrects or elucidates some questionable points in the novels, and includes a confession that Hornblower kicked Captain Sawyer down the hatchway of the Renown. It adds subsequent careers of Lord Hornblower's relatives, ending with the present Viscount Hornblower's emigration to South Africa in the late 1960s. According to Parkinson, Hornblower in later life became a director of P&O, governor of Malta (1829–1831), commander in chief at Chatham (1832–1835), a viscount (in 1850), and Admiral of the Fleet, dying at the age of 80 on 12 January 1857.

This biography has confused some readers, who have taken it as a factual work. Parkinson includes in Horatio's family tree a number of real-life Hornblowers. They include:

- Jonathan Hornblower senior and Jonathan Hornblower junior, noted engineers who designed and worked with steam engines in Cornish mines in the late 18th century
- Josiah Hornblower, an engineer who moved to America and became speaker of the New Jersey Assembly
- Jabez Carter Hornblower, son of Jonathan junior and another engineer

== Bibliography ==
The Hornblower canon by Forester consists of 11 novels (one unfinished) and five short stories. In addition, The Hornblower Companion includes maps showing where the action took place in the 10 complete novels and Forester's notes on how they were written.

UK title	Story dates	UK date of first publication	UK publisher	US title	US date of first publication	US publisher	Notes
The Happy Return	June – December 1808	4 February 1937	Michael Joseph	Beat to Quarters	6 April 1937	Little Brown	Novel
A Ship of the Line	April – November 1810	4 April 1938	Michael Joseph	Ship of the Line	18 March 1938	Little Brown	Novel. First published in serial form in Argosy from 26 February to 2 April, 1938.
Flying Colours	December 1810 – June 1811	1 November 1938	Michael Joseph	Flying Colours	3 January 1939	Little Brown	Novel
"Hornblower and His Majesty"	1813	March 1941	Argosy (UK)	"Hornblower and His Majesty"	23 March 1940	Collier's	Short story
"Hornblower and the Hand of Destiny"	1796	April 1941	Argosy (UK)	"The Hand of Destiny"	23 November 1940	Collier's	Short story
"Hornblower's Charitable Offering"	July 1810	May 1941	Argosy (UK)	"The Bad Samaritan"	18 January 1941	Argosy (US)	Short story intended as a chapter of A Ship of the Line
The Commodore	April – December 1812	12 March 1945	Michael Joseph	Commodore Hornblower	21 May 1945	Little Brown	Novel
Lord Hornblower	October 1813 – July 1815	11 June 1946	Michael Joseph	Lord Hornblower	24 September 1946	Little Brown	Novel
Mr. Midshipman Hornblower	January 1794 – February 1799	22 May 1950	Michael Joseph	Mr. Midshipman Hornblower	13 March 1950	Little Brown	Novel
"Hornblower and the Big Decision"	November 1799 – July 1800	April 1951	Argosy (UK)	"Hornblower's Temptation"	9 December 1950	The Saturday Evening Post	Short story subsequently published as "Hornblower and the Widow McCool" in Hornblower and the Crisis
Lieutenant Hornblower	August 1800 – March 1803	11 February 1952	Michael Joseph	Lieutenant Hornblower	27 March 1952	Little Brown	Novel
Hornblower and the Atropos	December 1805 – September 1806	9 November 1953	Michael Joseph	Hornblower and the Atropos	10 September 1953	Little Brown	Novel
Hornblower in the West Indies	May 1821 – July 1823	29 September 1958	Michael Joseph	Admiral Hornblower in the West Indies	28 August 1958	Little Brown	Novel
Hornblower and the Hotspur	April 1803 – May 1805	27 July 1962	Michael Joseph	Hornblower and the Hotspur	1 August 1962	Little Brown	Novel
The Hornblower Companion		4 December 1964	Michael Joseph	The Hornblower Companion	6 December 1964	Little Brown	Supplementary book comprising "The Hornblower Atlas" and "Some Personal Notes"
"The Last Encounter"	September – December 1848	8 May 1966	Sunday Mirror	"The Last Encounter"	April 1967	Argosy (US)	Short story subsequently published in Hornblower and the Crisis
Hornblower and the Crisis	May – June 1805	4 June 1967	Michael Joseph	Hornblower During the Crisis	8 November 1967	Little Brown	Unfinished novel plus "Hornblower and the Widow McCool" and "The Last Encounter"

Another short story, "The Point and the Edge", is included only as an outline in The Hornblower Companion. The following diagram shows the relationship between the dates of the stories' action and of their publication.

Story and Publication Dates

=== Omnibus publications ===
The first three novels written, The Happy Return, A Ship of the Line, and Flying Colours were collected as Captain Hornblower R.N (1939) by Michael Joseph and as Captain Horatio Hornblower (1939) by Little Brown in the US. Both a single-volume edition and a three-volume edition (in a slip case) were published.

Mr. Midshipman Hornblower, Lieutenant Hornblower, and Hornblower and the Atropos were compiled in one book, variously titled Hornblower's Early Years, Horatio Hornblower Goes to Sea, or The Young Hornblower. Hornblower and the Atropos was replaced by Hornblower and the Hotspur in later UK editions of The Young Hornblower.

Hornblower and the Atropos, The Happy Return, and A Ship of the Line were compiled into one omnibus edition, called Captain Hornblower.

Flying Colours, The Commodore, Lord Hornblower, and Hornblower in the West Indies were presented as a third omnibus edition called Admiral Hornblower to fill out the series.

Commodore Hornblower, Lord Hornblower, and Hornblower in the West Indies were also compiled into one book, called The Indomitable Hornblower.

Four "Cadet Editions" were released by Little Brown and later by Michael Joseph, each collecting two Hornblower novels and edited for younger readers: Hornblower Goes to Sea (1953, 1954), from Mr. Midshipman Hornblower and Lieutenant Hornblower; Hornblower Takes Command (1953, 1954), from Hornblower and The Atropos and Beat To Quarters; Hornblower in Captivity (1939, 1955), from A Ship of the Line and Flying Colours; and Hornblower's Triumph (1946, 1955), from Commodore Hornblower and Lord Hornblower.

The short stories "The Hand of Destiny", "Hornblower's Charitable Offering", and "Hornblower and His Majesty" plus other Hornblower material not previously published in book-form were collected in Hornblower One More Time (4 July 1976) though only 350 copies were printed.

As of June 2017 Amazon offers an electronic (Kindle) omnibus, Hornblower Addendum, consisting of the stories: "Hornblower and the Hand of Destiny", "Hornblower and the Widow McCool", "Hornblower's Charitable Offering", "Hornblower and His Majesty", and "The Last Encounter", although two of these are also included in the book Hornblower During the Crisis.

=== Serialisation ===
The Hornblower novels were all serialised in US periodicals and most also in UK periodicals. Except for the first novel Beat to Quarters, the serialisations appeared before the books.

US title	Story dates	US serial dates	US Parts	US magazine	UK serial dates	UK Parts	UK magazine
Beat to Quarters	June – December 1808	17 September 1938 – 22 October 1938	6	Argosy (US)	May 1949	1	Argosy (UK)
Ship of the Line	April – November 1810	26 February – 2 April 1938	6	Argosy (US)			
Flying Colours	December 1810 – June 1811	3 December 1938 – 7 January 1939	6	Argosy (US)			
Commodore Hornblower	April – December 1812	24 March – 12 May 1945	8	The Saturday Evening Post			
Lord Hornblower	October 1813 – June 1815	18 May – 6 July 1946	8	The Saturday Evening Post			
Mr. Midshipman Hornblower	January 1794 – February 1799	6 March 1948 – 11 March 1950	9	The Saturday Evening Post	August 1948 – June 1950	10	Argosy (UK)
Lieutenant Hornblower	August 1800 – March 1803	15 September – 17 November 1951	9	The Saturday Evening Post	6 October 1951 – 12 January 1952	10	John Bull
Hornblower and the Atropos	December 1805 – September 1806	25 July – 12 September 1953	8	The Saturday Evening Post	3 October – 28 November 1953	9	John Bull
Admiral Hornblower in the West Indies	May 1821 – July 1823	11 May 1957 – 26 April 1958	10	The Saturday Evening Post	25 May 1957 – 13 September 1958	13	John Bull
Hornblower and the Hotspur	April 1803 – May 1805	October 1962	1	Argosy (US)	24 February – 7 April 1962	7	Today
Hornblower During the Crisis	May – June 1805	16–30 July 1966	2	The Saturday Evening Post			

== In other media ==
=== Screen adaptations ===
- The film Captain Horatio Hornblower (1951) stars Gregory Peck in the title role, encompassing the events in The Happy Return, A Ship of the Line, and Flying Colours, with C. S. Forester sharing writing credits. Peck and co-star Virginia Mayo would recreate their roles on a one-hour Lux Radio Theater program broadcast on 21 January 1952, which is included as an audio-only feature in the film's DVD release.
- An episode of the American TV series Alcoa Premiere, Hornblower (1963) starring David Buck in the title role was based on Lord Hornblower
- The ITV and A&E television series Hornblower (1998–2003) stars Ioan Gruffudd as Hornblower, and included stories from Mr. Midshipman Hornblower, Lieutenant Hornblower, and Hornblower and the Hotspur.

=== Radio adaptations ===
- Michael Redgrave played Hornblower in a radio series of the same name between 1952 and 1953, later rebroadcast over Mutual in the United States syndicated via Towers of London.
- Nicholas Fry played Hornblower in the radio series The Hornblower Story in 1979/80 for the BBC (20 × 30 min.). This series covers the books, Mr Midshipman Hornblower, Lieutenant Hornblower, Hornblower and the Hotspur and Lord Hornblower.

=== Literary appearances ===
- In the fictional setting of The League of Extraordinary Gentlemen by Alan Moore, Hornblower is the equivalent of Lord Nelson, with The Black Dossier (2007) depicting Hornblower's Column as one of London's most popular landmarks.
- A "biography", called The Life and Times of Horatio Hornblower, was published in 1970 by C. Northcote Parkinson which gives various scholarly "corrections" to the stories told by Hornblower's creator.
- In Dudley Pope's 1965 novel Ramage, Hornblower is mentioned in passing as a former shipmate of the title character, Lord Ramage, when both were midshipmen.
- Sten Nadolny's 1983 novel The Discovery of Slowness contains allusions to the Hornblower cycle. For instance, the Lydia is written among other vessels in a sailor's bar in Plymouth. Lieutenant Gerard who appears in The Happy Return and A Ship of the Line is mentioned several times.
- In Dewey Lambdin's King, Ship, and Sword, the main character Alan Lewrie (another fictional British captain of the era) makes a visit to the Admiralty and takes particular note of a tall, thin lieutenant in a threadbare uniform with a melancholy expression. While the lieutenant's name is never mentioned, he displays several of Hornblower's best-known characteristics, and the state of a penniless lieutenant fits with the events at the end of Lieutenant Hornblower (this scene takes place during the Peace of Amiens).

== Legacy ==
Ernest Hemingway is quoted as saying, "I recommend Forester to everyone literate I know", and Winston Churchill stated, "I find Hornblower admirable."

The popular Richard Sharpe novels by Bernard Cornwell were inspired by the Hornblower series; Cornwell avidly read the series as a child, and was disappointed to learn that there was no similar series chronicling the Napoleonic Wars on land, so he set out to rectify this.

The first of Patrick O'Brian's Aubrey/Maturin novels was commissioned by an editor at American publisher J. B. Lippincott & Co., who thought that it was likely that O'Brian could write more novels in the Hornblower genre.

The Richard Bolitho series by Douglas Reeman (writing as Alexander Kent) has drawn him acclaim "as the true heir to the highly successful C. S. Forester [author of the Horatio Hornblower series of sea adventures]."

Dudley Pope was encouraged by C. S. Forester to create his Lord Ramage series of novels set around the same period.

Gene Roddenberry was influenced by the Hornblower character while creating the Star Trek characters James T. Kirk and Jean-Luc Picard. Nicholas Meyer, director of some of the Star Trek films, frequently cites Horatio Hornblower as one of his primary influences.

David Weber's character Honor Harrington closely parallels Hornblower, and Weber deliberately gave her the same initials. Like Hornblower, Harrington comes from a modest background, lacking patronage of any sort, and throughout the series accrues promotions, peerages and other honours, rising to the rank of admiral.

Lois McMaster Bujold's Vorkosigan Saga uses the Hornblower series as a structural model.

The astronauts of the 1972 Apollo 17 mission to the Moon named a small crater near the landing site Horatio in honour of Horatio Hornblower.

In 1980, US President Jimmy Carter gave his speech accepting the Democratic Party's nomination on August 14. This was notable for his gaffe intended to be a tribute to Hubert Horatio Humphrey, whom he referred to as "Hubert Horatio Hornblower".
