= Post-captain =

Obsolete Royal Navy rank

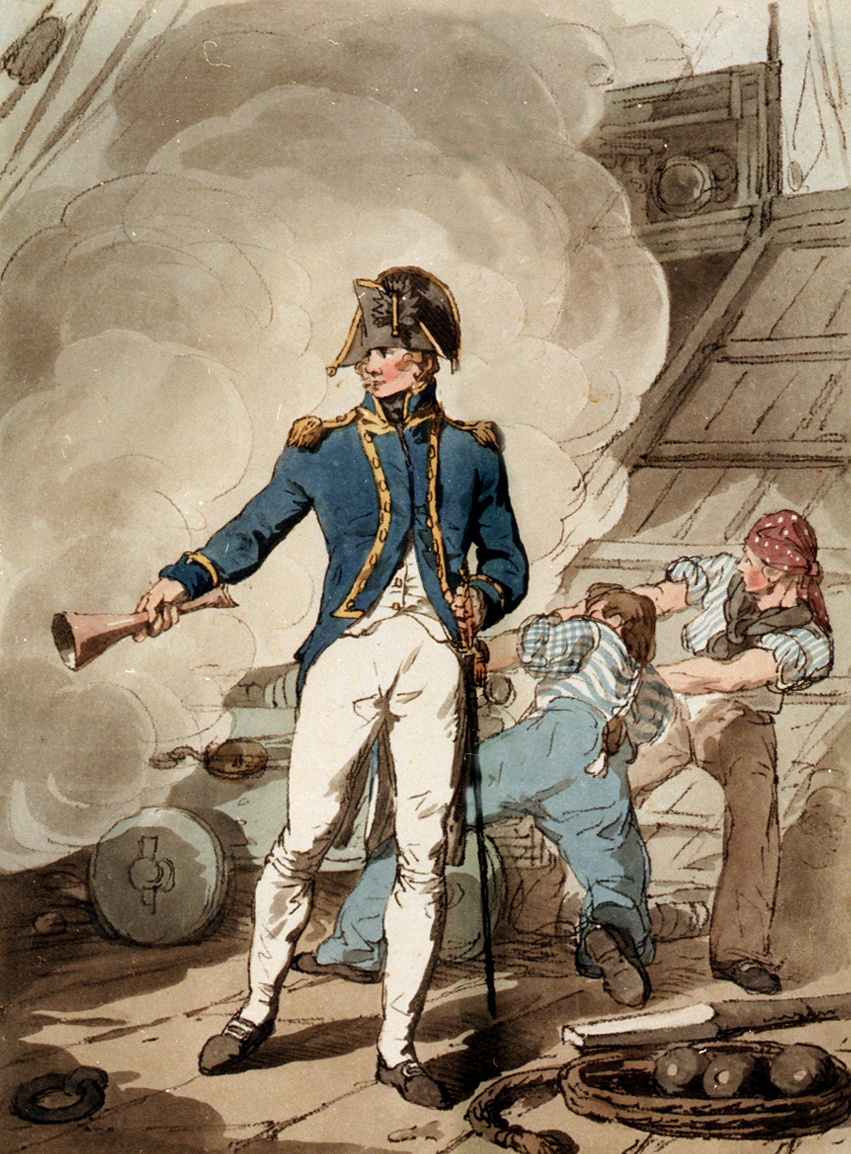
1807 illustration of a post-captain

Post-captain or post captain is an obsolete alternative form of the rank of captain in the Royal Navy. The term "post-captain" was descriptive only; it was never used as a title in the form "Post-Captain John Smith".

The term served to distinguish those who were captains by rank from:

- Officers in command of a naval vessel, who were (and still are) addressed as captain regardless of rank;
- Commanders, who received the title of captain as a courtesy, whether they currently had a command or not (e.g. the fictional Captain Jack Aubrey in Master and Commander or the fictional Captain Horatio Hornblower in Hornblower and the Hotspur). This custom is now defunct.

In the Royal Navy of the 18th and 19th centuries, an officer might be promoted from commander to captain, but not have a command. Until the officer obtained a command, he was "on the beach" and on half-pay. An officer "took post" or was "made post" when he was first commissioned to command a vessel. Usually this was a rated vessel – that is, a ship too important to be commanded by a lower-ranked commander – but was occasionally an unrated one. Once a captain was given a command, his name was "posted" in The London Gazette. Being "made post" is portrayed as the most crucial event in an officer's career in both Forester's Horatio Hornblower series and O'Brian's Aubrey-Maturin series. Once an officer was promoted to post-captain, further promotion was strictly by seniority; if he could avoid death or disgrace, he could eventually become an admiral (even if only a yellow admiral).

A junior post-captain would usually command a frigate or a comparable ship, while more senior post-captains would command larger ships. An exception to this rule was that a very junior post-captain could be posted to command an admiral's flagship, which was almost always a large ship of the line. The admiral would usually do this to keep his most junior captain under close observation and subject to his direct supervision. Captains commanding an admiral's flagship were called "flag captains". One example of this is the appointment of Alexander Hood to the command of HMS Barfleur, flagship of his cousin, Admiral Sir Samuel Hood.

Sometimes a high-ranking admiral would have two post-captains on his flagship. The junior would serve as the flag captain, listed in the ship's roll as the "second captain", with responsibility for the day-to-day operation of the vessel. The senior would be the captain of the fleet, listed as "first captain", and serving as the admiral's chief-of-staff.

After 1795, when they were introduced on Royal Navy uniforms, the number and position of epaulettes distinguished between commanders and post-captains of various seniorities. A commander wore a single epaulette on the left shoulder. A post-captain with less than three years' seniority wore a single epaulette on the right shoulder and a post-captain with three or more years seniority wore an epaulette on each shoulder. In the O'Brian series, Aubrey "wets the swab" – that is, he celebrates his promotion to commander and the acquisition of his "swab" or epaulette with the consumption of copious amounts of alcohol.

== See also ==
- Rating system of the Royal Navy
- Post-ship
