= C. S. Forester =

British novelist (1899–1966)

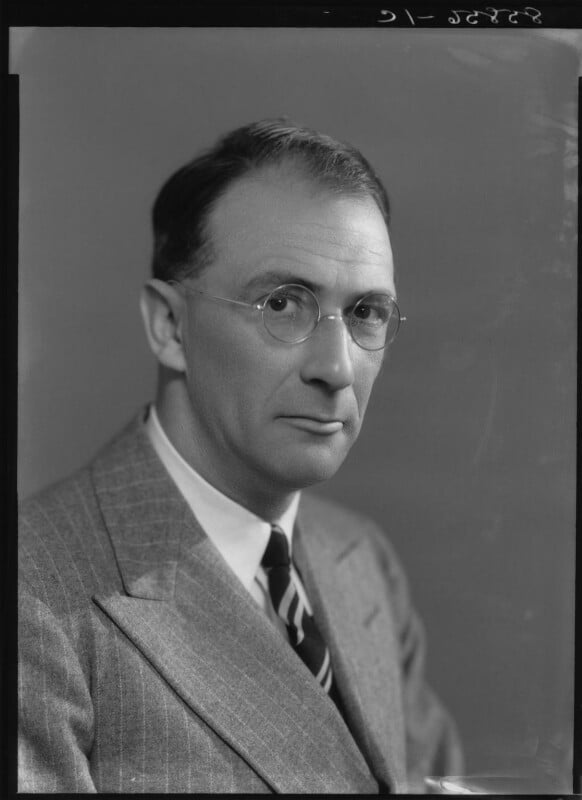
- Forester in 1939
- Born: Cecil Louis Troughton Smith; 27 August 1899; Cairo, Khedivate of Egypt
- Died: 2 April 1966 (aged 66); Fullerton, California, U.S.
- Education: Alleyn's School, Dulwich College
- Occupation: Novelist
- Spouses: Kathleen Belcher (m. 1926; div. 1945) Dorothy Foster (m. 1947)
- Children: John (1929–2020); George
- Writing career
- Genres: Adventure, drama, sea stories

Cecil Louis Troughton Smith (27 August 1899 – 2 April 1966), best known by his pen name C. S. Forester, was an English novelist known for writing tales of naval warfare, such as the 12-book Horatio Hornblower series depicting a Royal Navy officer during the Napoleonic Wars.

The Hornblower novels A Ship of the Line and Flying Colours were jointly awarded the 1938 James Tait Black Memorial Prize for fiction. Other works include The African Queen and The Good Shepherd, both of which were later adapted as movies.

During World War II, he moved to the United States where he worked for the British Ministry of Information, writing propaganda for the Allied cause. He eventually settled in Fullerton, California, where he died in 1966 of complications arising from a stroke.

== Early years ==
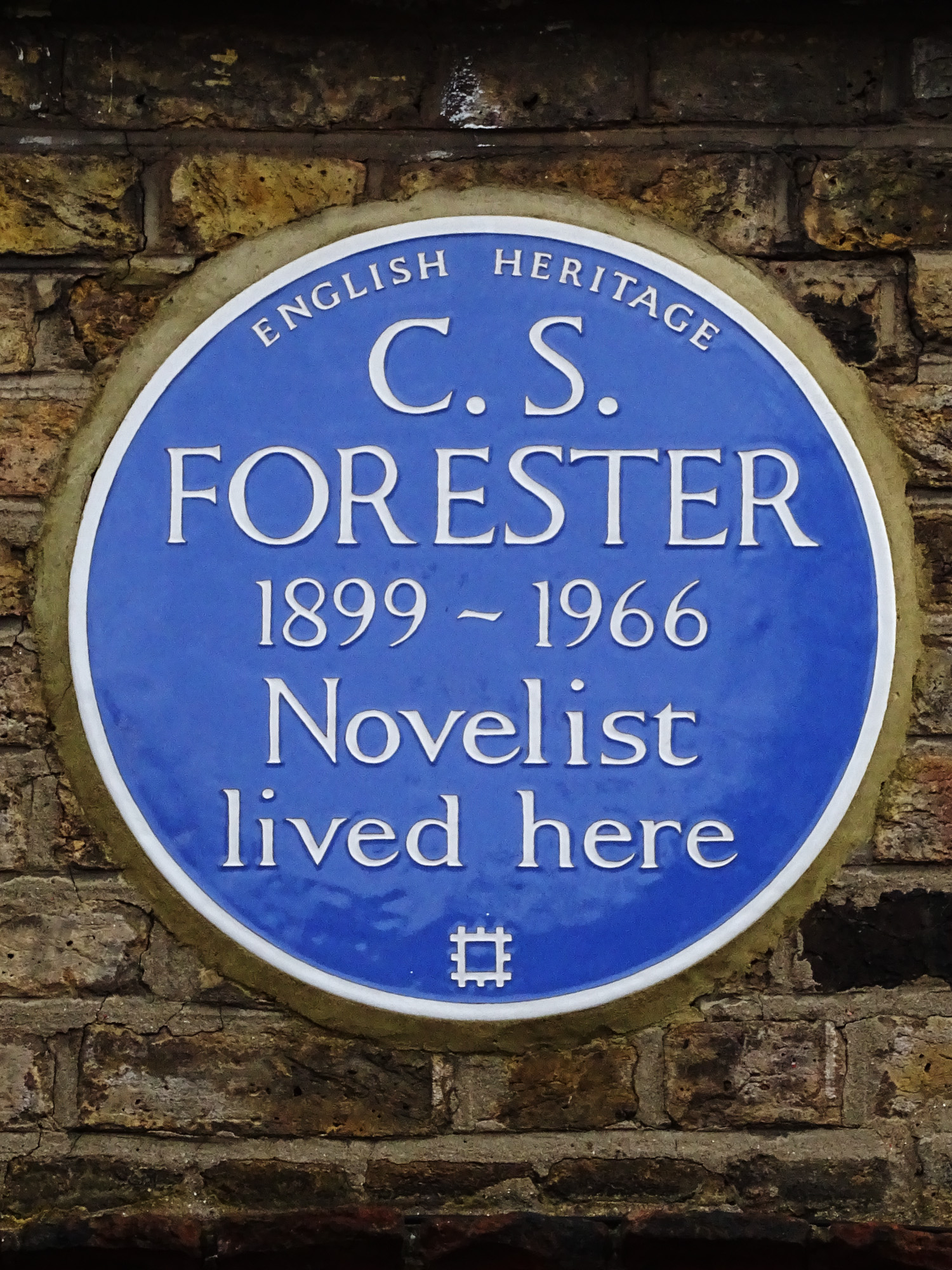
English heritage blue plaque in East Dulwich, south London

Forester was born in Cairo on 27 August 1899, fifth and youngest child of George Foster Smith and his wife Sarah Troughton. His father was an English teacher in a local school set up to give upper-class Egyptian boys an English education. His parents separated when he was young, and his mother took him to London, where he was educated at Alleyn's School and Dulwich College. He began to study medicine at Guy's Hospital, but left without completing his degree. He was somewhat athletic, wore glasses, and had a slender physique. He failed his Army physical and was told that there was no chance that he would be accepted. He began writing seriously, using his pen name, in around 1921.

== Second World War ==
During the Second World War, Forester moved to Berkeley, California, where he worked for the British Ministry of Information and wrote propaganda to encourage the U.S. to join the Allies.

In 1942, he met the young British diplomat Roald Dahl in Washington, D.C., and encouraged him to write about his experiences in the Royal Air Force. According to Dahl's autobiography, Lucky Break, Forester asked him about his experiences as a fighter pilot, and this prompted Dahl to write his first story, "A Piece of Cake".

== Literary career ==
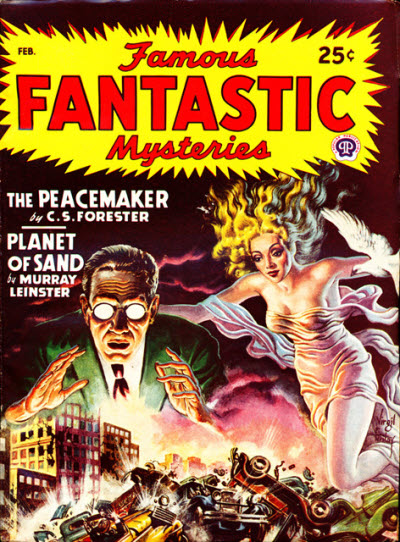
Forester's 1934 science fiction novel The Peacemaker was reprinted in Famous Fantastic Mysteries in 1948.

Forester wrote many novels, but he is best known for the 12-book Horatio Hornblower series about an officer in the Royal Navy during the Napoleonic Wars. He began the series with Hornblower a captain in the first novel, The Happy Return, which was published in 1937, but demand for more stories led him to fill in Hornblower's life story, and he wrote novels detailing his rise from the rank of midshipman. The last completed novel was published in 1962. Hornblower's fictional adventures were based on real events, but Forester wrote the body of the works carefully to avoid entanglements with real world history, so that Hornblower is always off on another mission when a great naval battle occurs during the Napoleonic Wars.

Forester's other novels include The African Queen (1935) and The General (1936); two novels about the Peninsular War, Death to the French in 1932 later on (published in the United States as Rifleman Dodd) and The Gun (filmed as The Pride and the Passion in 1957); and seafaring stories that do not involve Hornblower, such as Brown on Resolution (1929), The Captain from Connecticut (1941), The Ship (1943), and Hunting the Bismarck (1959), which was used as the basis of the screenplay for the film Sink the Bismarck! (1960). Several of his novels have been filmed, including The African Queen (1951), directed by John Huston. Forester is also credited as story writer on several films not based on his published novels, including Commandos Strike at Dawn (1942).

Forester also wrote several volumes of short stories set during the Second World War. Those in The Nightmare (1954) were based on events in Nazi Germany, ending at the Nuremberg trials. The linked stories in The Man in the Yellow Raft (1969) follow the career of the destroyer USS Boon, while many of the stories in Gold from Crete (1971) follow the destroyer HMS Apache. The last of the stories in Gold from Crete is If Hitler Had Invaded England, which offers an imagined sequence of events starting with Hitler's attempt to implement Operation Sea Lion and culminating in the early military defeat of Nazi Germany in the summer of 1941.

His non-fiction works about seafaring include The Age of Fighting Sail (1956), an account of the sea battles between Great Britain and the United States in the War of 1812.

Forester also published the crime novels Payment Deferred (1926) and Plain Murder (1930), as well as two children's books. Poo-Poo and the Dragons (1942) was created as a series of stories told to his son George to encourage him to finish his meals. George had mild food allergies and needed encouragement to eat. The Barbary Pirates (1953) is a children's history of early 19th-century pirates.

Forester appeared as a contestant on the television quiz programme You Bet Your Life, hosted by Groucho Marx, in an episode broadcast on 1 November 1956.

A previously unknown novel of Forester's, The Pursued, was discovered in 2003 and published by Penguin Classics on 3 November 2011.

== Personal life ==
Forester married Kathleen Belcher in 1926. They had two sons, John, born in 1929, and George, born in 1933. Forester moved to Berkeley, California, US in 1940 to further his career in Hollywood, commuting back and forth from Los Angeles. He had previously commuted back and forth from London since the production of Payment Deferred in 1932, but felt exhausted from the culture in LA and felt he needed even the little distance Berkeley provided. He was stricken with arteriosclerosis while at sea on a research trip aboard the USS Tennessee in 1943 which would leave him crippled. Belcher and Forester divorced in 1945.

Kathleen Belcher's great‑uncle was Edward Belcher, who achieved renown as a hydrographer and explorer. After his retirement, Belcher devoted much of his time to writing. After penning biographical material, he turned his hand to naval fiction, inventing a character called Horatio Howard Brenton, and attributing great feats and adventures to him. It is possible that Forester found some inspiration in these stories for his own Horatio Hornblower.

In 1947 Forester married another childhood friend, Dorothy Foster, as Forester's fortunes prospered from the successful releases of The African Queen and Captain Horatio Hornblower, the later which the then Princess Elizabeth and Princess Margaret visited the set of, and Princess Margaret attended the London premiere. Queen Elizabeth offered to award Forester the honour of Commander of the Order of the British Empire in her 1953 Coronation Honours; however, he turned it down in the hope of a knighthood.

Forester moved into his son John Forester's Fullerton, California home in 1959, suffered a stroke in 1964 which affected his ability to continue writing, and died on 2 April 1966.

John Forester wrote a two-volume biography of his father, including many elements of Forester's life which became clear to his son only after his father's death.

== Bibliography ==
=== Horatio Hornblower ===
1. 1950 Mr Midshipman Hornblower. Michael Joseph.
2. 1941 "The Hand of Destiny". Collier's
3. 1950 "Hornblower and the Widow McCool" ("Hornblower's Temptation" ""Hornblower and the Big Decision"). The Saturday Evening Post
4. 1952 Lieutenant Hornblower. Michael Joseph.
5. 1962 Hornblower and the Hotspur. Michael Joseph.
6. 1967 Hornblower and the Crisis, an unfinished novel. Michael Joseph. Published in the US as Hornblower During the Crisis (posthumous)
7. 1953 Hornblower and the Atropos. Michael Joseph.
8. 1937 The Happy Return. Michael Joseph. Published in the US as Beat to Quarters
9. 1938 A Ship of the Line. Michael Joseph.
10. 1941 "Hornblower's Charitable Offering". Argosy
11. 1938 Flying Colours. Michael Joseph.
12. 1941 "Hornblower and His Majesty". Collier's
13. 1945 The Commodore. Michael Joseph. Published in the US as Commodore Hornblower
14. 1946 Lord Hornblower. Michael Joseph.
15. 1958 Hornblower in the West Indies. Michael Joseph. Published in the US as Admiral Hornblower in the West Indies
16. 1967 "The Last Encounter". Sunday Mirror, 8 May 1966 (posthumous).
17. 1964 The Hornblower Companion. Michael Joseph. (Supplementary book comprising another short story, "The Point and the Edge" only as an outline, "The Hornblower Atlas" and "Some Personal Notes")

==== Omnibus ====
1. 1964 The Young Hornblower. (a compilation of full-length books 1, 2 & 3; numbers 1,4,5 above). Michael Joseph.
2. 1965 Captain Hornblower (a compilation of full-length books 5, 6 & 7; numbers 7,8,9 above). Michael Joseph.
3. 1968 Admiral Hornblower (a compilation of full-length books 8, 9, 10 & 11; numbers 11,13,14,15 above). Michael Joseph.
4. 2011 Hornblower Addendum – Five Short Stories (originally published in magazines)

=== Other novels ===
- 1924 A Pawn among Kings. Methuen.
- 1924 The Paid Piper. Methuen.
- 1926 Payment Deferred. Methuen.
- 1927 Love Lies Dreaming. John Lane.
- 1927 The Wonderful Week. John Lane.
- 1928 The Daughter of the Hawk. John Lane.
- 1929 Brown on Resolution. John Lane.
- 1930 Plain Murder. John Lane.
- 1931 Two-and-Twenty. John Lane.
- 1932 Death to the French. John Lane. Published in the U.S. as Rifleman Dodd. Little Brown.
- 1933 The Gun. John Lane.
- 1934 The Peacemaker. Heinemann.
- 1935 The African Queen. Heinemann.
- 1935 The Pursued (a lost novel rediscovered in 1999 and published by Penguin Classics in 2011)
- 1936 The General. Michael Joseph. First published as a serial in the News Chronicle 14–18 January 1935
- 1940 The Earthly Paradise. Michael Joseph. Published in the U.S. as To the Indies.
- 1941 The Captain from Connecticut. Michael Joseph.
- 1942 Poo-Poo and the Dragons. Michael Joseph.
- 1943 The Ship. Michael Joseph.
- 1948 The Sky and the Forest. Michael Joseph.
- 1951 Randall and the River of Time. Michael Joseph.
- 1955 The Good Shepherd. Michael Joseph.

==== Short stories ====
- "The Wandering Gentile", Liverpool Echo, 1955

=== Posthumous ===
- 1967 Long before Forty (autobiographical). Michael Joseph.
- 1971 Gold from Crete (short stories). Michael Joseph.
- 2011 The Pursued (novel). Penguin.

=== Collections ===
- 1944 The Bedchamber Mystery; to which is added the story of The Eleven Deckchairs and Modernity and Maternity. S. J. Reginald Saunders. Published in the US as Three Matronly Mysteries. eNet Press
- 1954 The Nightmare. Michael Joseph
- 1969 The Man in the Yellow Raft. Michael Joseph (posthumous)

=== Plays in three acts; John Lane ===
- 1931 U 97
- 1933 Nurse Cavell. (with C. E. Bechhofer Roberts)

=== Non-fiction ===
- 1922 Victor Emmanuel II. Methuen (?)
- 1927 Victor Emmanuel II and the Union of Italy. Methuen.
- 1924 Napoleon and his Court. Methuen.
- 1925 Josephine, Napoleon's Empress. Methuen.
- 1928 Louis XIV, King of France and Navarre. Methuen.
- 1929 Lord Nelson. John Lane.
- 1929 The Voyage of the Annie Marble. John Lane.
- 1930 The Annie Marble in Germany. John Lane.
- 1936 Marionettes at Home. Michael Joseph Ltd.
- 1953 The Adventures of John Wetherell. Doubleday & Company, Inc.
- 1953 The Barbary Pirates. Landmark Books, Random House. Published in the UK in 1956 by Macdonald & Co.
- 1957 The Naval War of 1812. Michael Joseph. Published in the US as The Age of Fighting Sail
- 1959 Hunting the Bismarck. Michael Joseph. Published in the US as The Last Nine Days of the Bismark and Sink the Bismarck

==== Non-fiction short pieces ====
- "Calmness under Air Raids in Franco Territory". Western Mail, 28 April 1937
- "Who Is Financing Franco?". Aberdeen Press & Journal, 5 May 1937
- "Sabotage". Sunday Graphic, 11 September 1938
- "Saga of the Submarines". Falkirk Herald, 1 August 1945
- "Hollywood Coincidence". Leicester Chronicle, 3 September 1955

== Film adaptations ==
In addition to providing the source material for numerous adaptations (not all of which are listed below), Forester was also credited as "adapted for the screen by" for Captain Horatio Hornblower.

- Payment Deferred (1932), based on a 1931 play which was in turn based on Forester's novel of the same name
- Brown on Resolution (1935), based on the novel of the same name
- Eagle Squadron (1942), story
- Commandos Strike at Dawn (1942), short story "The Commandos"
- Forever and a Day (1943), story
- Captain Horatio Hornblower (1951), based on the novels The Happy Return, A Ship of the Line and Flying Colours
- The African Queen (1951), the novel of the same name
- Sailor of the King (1953), the novel Brown on Resolution
- The Pride and the Passion (1957), the novel The Gun
- Sink the Bismarck! (1960), the novel The Last Nine Days of the Bismarck
- Hornblower (1998–2003 series of made-for-television movies), based on the novels Mr. Midshipman Hornblower, Lieutenant Hornblower and Hornblower and the Hotspur
- Greyhound (2020), the novel The Good Shepherd

== See also ==
- Honor Harrington – a fictional space captain and admiral in the Honorverse novels by David Weber, inspired by Horatio Hornblower (see dedication in On Basilisk Station)
- Patrick O'Brian – author of the Aubrey–Maturin series
- Dudley Pope – author of the Ramage series
- Richard Woodman – author of the Nathaniel Drinkwater series
- Douglas Reeman (writing as Alexander Kent) – The Bolitho novels
