= Lyle F. Bull =

US Navy admiral (1938–2018)

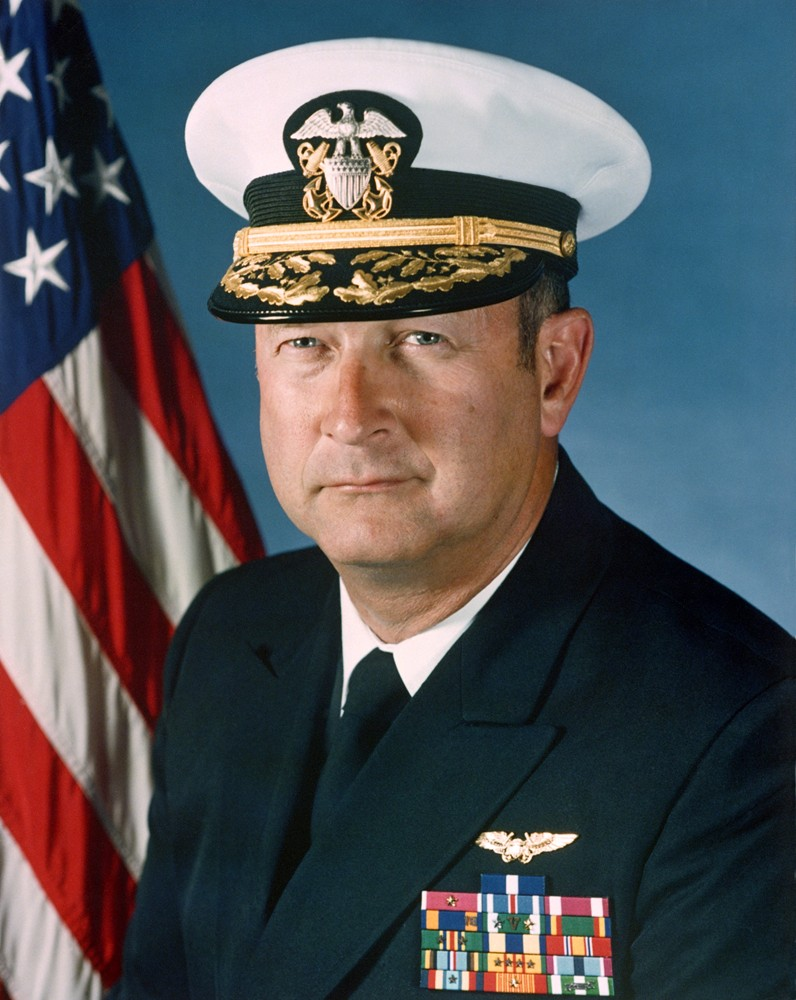
- Born: April 8, 1938; Illinois, U.S.
- Died: May 4, 2018 (aged 80); Oak Harbor, Washington, U.S.
- Relatives: Dell Bull (son)
- Military career
- Allegiance: United States
- Branch: United States Navy
- Service years: 1960–1963; 1965–1998
- Rank: Rear Admiral
- Commands: Carrier Strike Group 5 Carrier Strike Group 7 USS Constellation; USS San Jose; VA-128; VA-196
- Conflicts: Vietnam War
- Awards: Navy Cross; Navy Distinguished Service Medal; Legion of Merit (2); Distinguished Flying Cross

Lyle Franklin Bull (April 8, 1938 – May 4, 2018) was a rear admiral and Naval Flight Officer bombardier/navigator in the United States Navy. For extraordinary heroism on a bombing run over Hanoi in 1967, Bull was awarded the Navy Cross, the navy's second highest honor. The Hanoi mission for which Bull received the citation was a key storyline in the novel, Flight of the Intruder as well as a film by the same name.

== Early and personal life ==
Lyle Franklin Bull was born on April 8, 1938, in Illinois. He and his future wife, Diana Stone, met while in high school at a softball game sponsored by the Lutheran church the teens attended in Port Byron, Illinois. After they started dating, the couple married in 1956 when Bull was 18 and Stone was 19. Both were attending Iowa State University at the time, with Bull's new wife beginning her junior year and Bull a freshman. Although they originally planned to wait and have children after college, their first child, Ron Bull, was born in 1958, 13 months following their wedding. Three more sons would follow: Vince in 1959, Bruce in 1960, and Dell in 1965.

== Navy career ==
=== Early years ===
A Naval Reservist before graduating high school, Bull attended boot camp at Naval Station Great Lakes in Illinois and had joined the Reserve Officer Candidate Program, which required attendance of a Navy Reserve meeting weekly in Des Moines, Iowa. Following his graduation from Iowa State and completion of the 20-week Officer Candidate School course, Bull was commissioned an ensign. At this time, and after the birth of their third son, Bull and his family were stationed at NAS Pensacola in Florida. Having previously failed the required eye-exam to become a pilot, Bull was given the opportunity to become a Naval Aviation Observer (later redesignated Naval Flight Officer) and was next sent to NAS Corpus Christi in Texas for his Navigator wings. It was then that Bull was selected to become a bombardier/navigator in the navy's A-3D, a heavy attack, carrier-based nuclear bomber jet. Bull then moved his family to NAS Whidbey in Oak Harbor, Washington. Bull was first assigned to training (RAG) squadron VAH-123 and after his training, VAH-4, also at NAS Whidbey.

Following deployment aboard the USS Bon Homme Richard, Bull had completed his commitment to the Naval Reserve and separated from the navy in 1964, moving with his family to East Moline, Illinois, to be near his and his wife's parents.

=== Second Navy career ===
With the Cold War continuing and the United States' involvement in the Vietnam War building up, Bull had been contacted several times by the navy to rejoin. In January 1965, Bull was selected to be one of six A-3D bombardier/navigators to be trained in the A-6A Intruder at NAS Oceana in Virginia Beach, Virginia. Following his training, Bull returned to NAS Whidbey as part of VA-128, the first A-6 training squadron on the Pacific Coast.

==== Hanoi mission and the Navy Cross ====
When a lieutenant in 1968, Bull received the Navy Cross for his role as bombardier-navigator in a 1967 bombing mission during the Vietnam War with VA-196. His Navy Cross citation reads:

The President of the United States of America takes pleasure in presenting the Navy Cross to Lieutenant Lyle Franklin Bull (NSN: 0-643704), United States Navy, for extraordinary heroism on 30 October 1967 as a Bombardier/Navigator in Attack Squadron ONE HUNDRED NINETY-SIX (VA-196), embarked in U.S.S. CONSTELLATION (CVA-64). Exercising exceptional professional skill and sound judgment, Lieutenant Bull assisted in the planning and execution of an extremely dangerous, single-plane, night, radar bombing attack on the strategically located and heavily defended Hanoi railroad ferry slip in North Vietnam. Although the entire Hanoi defensive effort was concentrated upon his lone bomber, he flawlessly assisted his pilot in navigating the aircraft to the target area and commencing an attack. Seconds before bomb release, six enemy surface-to-air missiles were observed to be tracking on his plane. Undaunted by this threat to his personal safety, Lieutenant Bull assisted his pilot in taking swift and effective action to avoid the missiles and complete the attack, releasing all weapons in the target area with extreme accuracy. After release, four more missiles were fired at his aircraft in addition to the intense anti-aircraft-artillery fire. In spite of this intense enemy opposition, Lieutenant Bull completed his mission and was directly responsible for dealing a significant blow to the North Vietnamese logistics efforts. His indomitable perseverance and conspicuous gallantry were in keeping with the highest traditions of the United States Naval Service.

The Hanoi mission for which Bull received the citation was one of the key storylines for the Stephen Coonts novel, Flight of the Intruder as well as a film by the same name. Both Coonts and Bull served in A-6 Intruder squadrons at NAS Whidbey during the same time period in the 1960s and 1970s.

==== Post-Vietnam, commands, decorations ====
Bull served in A-6 squadrons throughout the Vietnam War; following the war, in 1974 and as a commander, Bull was assigned as executive officer of VA-196 at NAS Whidbey.

Bull next served as a Deputy Director of Naval Training, Deputy Chief of Naval Operations for Air Warfare, deputy commander-in-chief of the United States Pacific Fleet, and commanding officer of the USS Constellation, from 1982 to 1984. He also served as Commander Task Force 70/77 and Commander Carrier Group 5 based out of Cubi Point Philippines.

Other than the Navy Cross, Bull's awards include the Navy Distinguished Service Medal, Distinguished Flying Cross, 19 Air Medals, several Navy commendations, unit awards, meritorious service awards, and a medal from the Imperial Order of the Rising Sun awarded by the Japanese Maritime Self Defense Force.

== Later life and death ==
After 38 years of service, both reserve and active duty, Bull retired from the navy in 1993. Following his retirement, he and his wife remained in Oak Harbor. Among his community involvements following retirement was spearheading a project that needed a levy passed to get a new football stadium built for Oak Harbor High School. His efforts in getting the levy passed and the facility completed came to fruition in 2007.

Bull died at his Oak Harbor home, at age 80, surrounded by family, on 4 May 2018. His memorial service took place on 12 May 2018 in the Base Chapel, NAS Whidbey Island. Full military honors were given with a navy honor guard providing Taps as well as a 21-gun salute. A missing-man formation flyover was performed by EA-18G Growler squadron VAQ-134 from NAS Whidbey.
