= List of Grumman A-6 Intruder operators =

The following were operators of the Grumman A-6 Intruder:

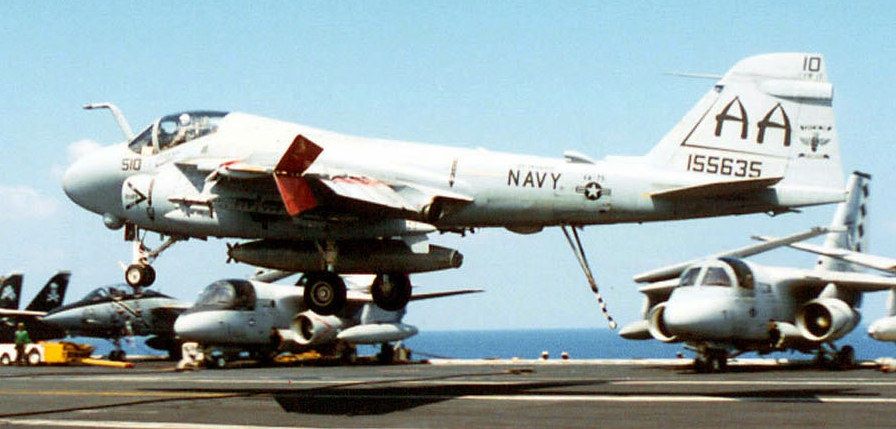
A-6 Intruder from VA-75

== Operators ==
=== United States Navy ===
- VA-34 — Blue Blasters. Established 1970. Redesignated VFA-34 in 1996, flying F/A-18C Hornets. Based at Naval Air Station Oceana, Virginia.
- VA-35 — Black Panthers. Callsign: "Raygun." Transitioned from the A-1 Skyraider in 1965. Based at NAS Oceana. Was featured in the film The Final Countdown along with the rest of Carrier Air Wing 8 on board the USS Nimitz. Disestablished 1995. An A-6 Intruder, Bureau number : 152603, from the squadron, is currently on display at the Richmond Municipal Airport in Richmond Indiana.
- VA-36 — Roadrunners. Callsign: "Heartless." Established 1987. Based at NAS Oceana. Disestablished 1994.
- VA-42 — Green Pawns, Thunderbolts (from 1992). Transitioned from the A-1 Skyraider in 1963. Atlantic Fleet Replacement Squadron (FRS), i.e., A-6E training squadron. Also operated TC-4C Academe aircraft. Based at NAS Oceana. Disestablished 1994.
- VA-52 — Knight Riders. Callsign: "Viceroy. Transitioned from the A-1 Skyraider in 1967. Based at Naval Air Station Whidbey Island, Washington. Disestablished 1995.
- VA-55 — Warhorses. Established 1983. Based at NAS Oceana. Disestablished 1991.
- VA-65 — World Famous Fighting Tigers. Callsigns: "Cupcake" and "Fighting Tiger." Transitioned from the A-1 Skyraider in 1965. Based at NAS Oceana. Disestablished 1993.
- VA-75 — World Famous Sunday Punchers. Callsign: "Flying Ace." Transitioned from the A-1 Skyraider in 1963. First operational Intruder squadron. Based at NAS Oceana. Last operational Intruder squadron. Disestablished 1997.
- VA-85 — Black Falcons. Callsign: "Buckeye." Transitioned from the A-1 Skyraider in 1964. Based at NAS Oceana. Disestablished 1994.
- VA-95 — Green Lizards. Previously an A-1 Skyraider squadron that transitioned to A-4 Skyhawks and was later disestablished in 1970. Reestablished as an A-6 squadron in 1972. Based at NAS Whidbey Island. Last Vietnam-era A-6 squadron to be established. Significant engagements included Operation Frequent Wind (Saigon evacuation), the Mayaguez Incident, and Operation Praying Mantis (actions against Iranian naval units, including the sinking of the Iranian frigate Sahand, the largest ship to be sunk by this aircraft type) . Disestablished 1995.
- VA-115 — Arabs, Eagles (from 1979). Transitioned from the A-1 Skyraider. Disestablished in 1967. Reestablished as an A-6 squadron in 1970. Redesignated VFA-115 in 1996, flying F/A-18E Super Hornets, introducing this model into combat during Operation Iraqi Freedom in 2003. Initially based at NAS Whidbey Island, then forward-deployed at Naval Air Facility Atsugi, Japan from 1973 until redesignation. Reassigned to new home base of Naval Air Station Lemoore, California in October 1996. Reassigned to previous home base of NAF Atsugi in December 2009.
- VAH-123 — Pros. Established 1957. Based at NAS Whidbey Island. The Pros were the Pacific Fleet's FRS for the A-3 Skywarrior and provided FRS services for the Pacific Fleet A-6 community for about one year until the establishment of VA-128 in 1967. Disestablished 1971.
- VA-128 — Golden Intruders. Callsign: (early)"Goldplate" (later) "Phoenix." Established from a detachment of VAH-123 in 1967. Pacific FRS. Based at NAS Whidbey Island. VA-128's insigia and traditions were later adopted by VAQ-128, established 1997 (since disestablished) flying the EA-6B Prowler. VA-128 disestablished 1995.
- VA-145 — Swordsmen. Callsigns: "Electron," later "Rustler." Transitioned from the A-1 Skyraider in 1968. Home based at NAS Whidbey Island, WA. Disestablished 1993.
- VA-155 — Silver Foxes. Callsign(s): Stateside callsign: "Vixen" / Deployment callsign: "Jackal". Reason for difference was flight safety/deconfliction by local NAS Whidbey Island Approach Control and NAS Whidbey Island Air Traffic Control Tower in order to avoid confusion with VAQ-138 "Jacket" callsign, this despite the similarities between "Vixen" and "Phoenix" (VA-128 Callsign). Established 1987. Based at NAS Whidbey Island. Disestablished 1993.
- VA-165 — Boomers. Transitioned from the A-1 Skyraider in 1967. Based at NAS Whidbey Island. Unit that filmed the inflight, flight deck, and hangar deck scenes for film Flight of the Intruder. Disestablished 1996.
- VA-176 — Thunderbolts. Transitioned from the A-1 Skyraider in 1969. Based at NAS Oceana. Only A-6 Squadron in history to win 3 consecutive Battle "E" awards. Disestablished 1992.
- VA-185 — Nighthawks. Established 1986. Initially based at NAS Whidbey Island, then within a year forward-deployed to NAF Atsugi, Japan until disestablishment. A-6 squadron with the shortest history. Disestablished 1991.
- VA-196 — Main Battery. Callsign: "Milestone." Transitioned from the A-1 Skyraider in 1966. Based at NAS Whidbey Island. Squadron featured in the film Flight of the Intruder. Last Pacific Fleet squadron to operate the Intruder. Disestablished 1997.
- VA-205 — Green Falcons. Established 1970, transitioned from the A-7E Corsair II in 1990. Atlantic Fleet Naval Air Reserve squadron, based at Naval Air Station Atlanta, Georgia. Flew A-6Es and KA-6Ds. Disestablished 1995.
- VA-304 — Firebirds. Established 1970, transitioned from the A-7E Corsair II in 1988. Pacific Fleet Naval Air Reserve squadron, based at Naval Air Station Alameda, California. Flew A-6Es and KA-6Ds. Shares the same name (Firebirds) with VAQ-33. Disestablished 1994.
- VAQ-33 — Firebirds. Redesignated from VAW-33 in 1968. Initially based at Naval Air Station Norfolk, Virginia and NAS Oceana, until 1980, then to Naval Air Station Key West, Florida until disestablishment. Tactical Electronic Warfare Squadron 33 provided the U.S. Navy with training by simulating the electronic signatures of Soviet aircraft. Flew EA-6A Intruder version only, in addition to other aircraft types. Shares the same name (Firebirds) with VA-304. LT Kara Hultgreen flew EA-6As in this squadron prior to becoming the Navy's first fully qualified female F-14 Tomcat combat pilot. Disestablished 1993.
- VX-5 — Vampires. Established 1951. Based at Naval Air Weapons Station China Lake, California. Merged with VX-4 Evaluators in 1993 to become VX-9 Vampires. Retired last A-6E in 1996.
- VX-31 — Dust Devils. Formerly “Weapons Test Squadron”. Based at Naval Air Weapons Station China Lake, California. Retired last two A-6E’s operating in Naval Service in 1997 after all other squadron Aircraft had been retired.
- Naval Strike Warfare Center — Strike U. Established 1984. Based at Naval Air Station Fallon, Nevada. Merged with Navy Fighter Weapons School (TOPGUN) and Carrier Airborne Early Warning Weapons School (CAEWWS) (TOPDOME) in 1996 to create Naval Strike and Air Warfare Center (NSAWC). Retired last A-6E in 1995.
- Pacific Missile Test Center (PMTC) Based at NAS Point Mugu.

=== United States Marine Corps ===
- VMA(AW)-121 — Green Knights. Since redesignated as VMFA(AW)-121 flying the F/A-18D and now as VMFA-121 flying the F-35B.
- VMA(AW)-224 — Bengals. (Formerly called Vultures during Vietnam) Since redesignated as VMFA(AW)-224 flying the F/A-18D Hornet.
- VMA(AW)-225 — Vagabonds, later Vikings. Decommissioned after Vietnam and later recommissioned and redesignated as VMFA(AW)-225 flying the F/A-18D Hornet.
- VMA(AW)-242 — Batmen (in Vietnam era, later known as the "Bats"). Since redesignated as VMFA(AW)-242 flying the F/A-18D Hornet.
- VMA(AW)-332 — Moonlighters. (AKA Polkadots) Last Marine Corps unit to fly the A-6E Intruder. Since redesignated as VMFA(AW)-332. Flew the F/A-18D Hornet until placed in cadre status in 2007.
- VMA(AW)-533 — Hawks. Since redesignated as VMFA(AW)-533 flying the F/A-18D Hornet.
- VMAT(AW)-202 — Double Eagles Marine Corps A-6E Intruder Fleet Replacement Squadron (deactivated).

In the 1990s, all Marine A-6E squadrons, except VMAT(AW)-202, were re-equipped with F/A-18D 'Night Attack' Hornet (including their recon-capable sub-version wired for ATARS) and re-designated to VMFA(AW). Due to the shortage of F/A-18D airframes in 2007 VMFA(AW)-332 was reduced to a "cadre status".
