= Robert J. Flynn =

American naval commander

Robert James Flynn
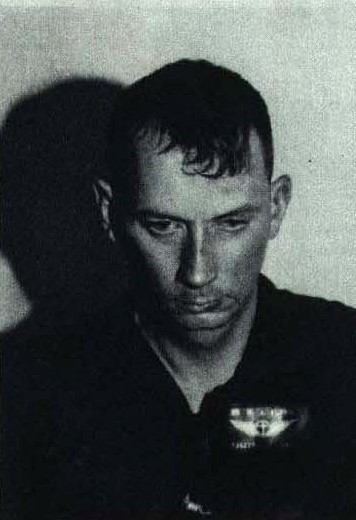
- Flynn following his capture in 1967
- Born: September 15, 1937; La Crosse, Wisconsin
- Died: May 15, 2014 (aged 76); Gulf Breeze, Florida
- Military career
- Allegiance: United States of America
- Branch: United States Navy
- Service years: 1958-85
- Rank: Commander
- Conflicts: Vietnam War
- Awards: Legion of Merit; Distinguished Flying Cross; Bronze Star (3); Purple Heart (2); Air Medal (6); Prisoner of War Medal

Robert James Flynn (September 15, 1937 – May 15, 2014) was a Commander and Naval Flight Officer bombardier/navigator in the United States Navy. As a Lieutenant, he was captured by the Chinese in August 1967 after the A-6 Intruder he was flying in on an attack on Vietnam was shot down. Flynn and his pilot, along with another A-6 Intruder crew, were attempting to escape from defending North Vietnamese jets following their attack on Hanoi when they intruded more than 11 miles (18 km) into Chinese air space. Flynn was apprehended by the Chinese and held in China as a Prisoner of War where he claims he was tortured and held almost exclusively in solitary confinement for five and a half years.

== Early life ==
Flynn was born in La Crosse, Wisconsin and was raised in Houston, Minnesota. He attended the University of Minnesota.

== US Navy career ==
On July 6, 1958, he joined the United States navy as a cadet. On June 20, 1960, he was designated as a Naval Flight Officer. He completed A-3D training with VAH-123 at NAS Whidbey Island from June 1960 to January 1961 he served as an A-3D navigator with VAH-8 from January 1961 to June 1963. From June 1963 to March 1966 he served as an A-6A Intruder instructor bombardier/navigator with VA-85 at NAS Oceana. VA-85 deployed on USS Kitty Hawk from March to August 1966. He transferred to VA-196 at NAS Whidbey Island in August 1966. In May 1967 VA-196 was deployed on the USS Constellation for deployment to Vietnam.

== Capture ==
On 21 August 1967 four A-6A Intruders of VA-196 were launched from USS Constellation for an attack on the Duc Noi railyard in northern Hanoi. Lieutenant Commander Jimmy L. Buckley (pilot) and Lieutenant Flynn (bombardier/navigator) were the crew of A-6A [BuNo 152625/NK 400] which was hit by enemy fire on approach to the target area but continued with their attack. Over the target area the flight encountered heavy anti-aircraft fire and SAMs, A-6A [BuNo 152638/NK 410] was hit by enemy fire and both crewmen, Lieutenant Commander William M. Hardman and Captain Leo T. Profilet, ejected successfully but were captured. The remaining three A-6s left the target area in loose formation and were forced to head north to avoid bad weather, one of the aircraft sighted MiGs and two of the A-6s were tracked heading towards the Chinese border with two Shenyang J-6 fighters in pursuit. A-6A [BuNo 152627/NK 402] was shot down north of the Chinese border and both crewmen, Lieutenant j.g. Forrest Trembley (pilot) and Lieutenant j.g. Dain Scott (bombardier/navigator) were killed. A-6A '400' was also shot down, Lieutenant Commander Buckley was killed, while Lieutenant Flynn ejected successfully but was also captured. Later that day Chinese government radio confirmed that they had shot down two aircraft inside Chinese territory and that one crewman had been captured. Lieutenant Flynn claimed to believe that the Chinese fighters had attacked their flight over North Vietnamese territory, but US radar showed that the two A-6s were at least 11 miles (18 km) inside Chinese territory when they were shot down.

Flynn was taken to Peking where he was held in solitary confinement for the next five and a half years. He claims he was constantly tortured and was demanded to sign a confession that stated that he was a criminal who had violated Chinese airspace. Flynn refused to cooperate.

== Release ==
Due to improving US-China relations following President Richard Nixon's historic 1972 visit to China, Flynn and United States Air Force Major Philip E. Smith who was shot down while intruding into Chinese airspace over Hainan in 1965 were released on 15 March 1973, crossing the land border into the British Hong Kong where they were received by a representative of the American Red Cross and U.S. consular officials. Both men were then flown by helicopter to Kai Tak Airport and then flown to Clark Air Base in The Philippines where they were processed together with U.S. prisoners of war released from North Vietnam as part of Operation Homecoming.

== Post-release ==
Flynn returned to US Navy duty as an A-6 bombardier/navigator, serving as an A-6 instructor bombardier/navigator with VA-128 at NAS Whidbey Island from November 1973 until February 1975. He served as a bombardier/navigator with VA-165 from February 1975 until June 1976 when he completed his degree at the University of Washington. He served as executive officer and then commanded NFO Training Squadron 86 at Naval Air Station Pensacola from August 1977 to October 1980. From October 1980 to November 1981 he served as Executive Officer of Fleet Combat Training Center. His final assignment was as Director of Aviation Warfare Training with Chief of Naval Education and Training at NAS Pensacola from November 1981 until his retirement with the rank of Commander in November 1985. He was awarded the Legion of Merit, Distinguished Flying Cross, Bronze Star with "V" and two gold stars and the Prisoner of War Medal.

Flynn died of a heart attack at the age of 76 on May 15, 2014, in Gulf Breeze, Florida (he resided in Pensacola, Florida).

== Awards and decorations ==
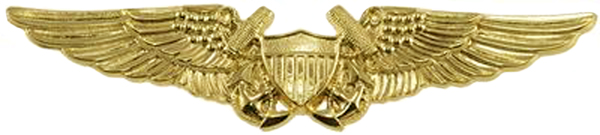

Naval Flight Officer insignia
Legion of Merit w/ Combat "V"	Distinguished Flying Cross	Bronze Star w/ Combat "V" two 5/16" gold stars
Purple Heart w/ one 5/16" gold star	Air Medal w/ Strike/Flight Numeral 6	Navy and Marine Corps Commendation Medal w/ Combat "V" one 5/16" gold star
Combat Action Ribbon	Navy Unit Commendation w/ one 3/16" bronze star	Navy E Ribbon
Prisoner of War Medal	National Defense Service Medal	Armed Forces Expeditionary Medal
Vietnam Service Medal w/ three 3/16" silver stars and one 3/16" bronze star	Republic of Vietnam Gallantry Cross Unit Citation w/ Palm and Frame	Vietnam Campaign Medal

== See also ==
- John T. Downey
- Richard Fecteau
