= Gregory C. Johnson =

American astronaut (born 1954)

Gregory Johnson
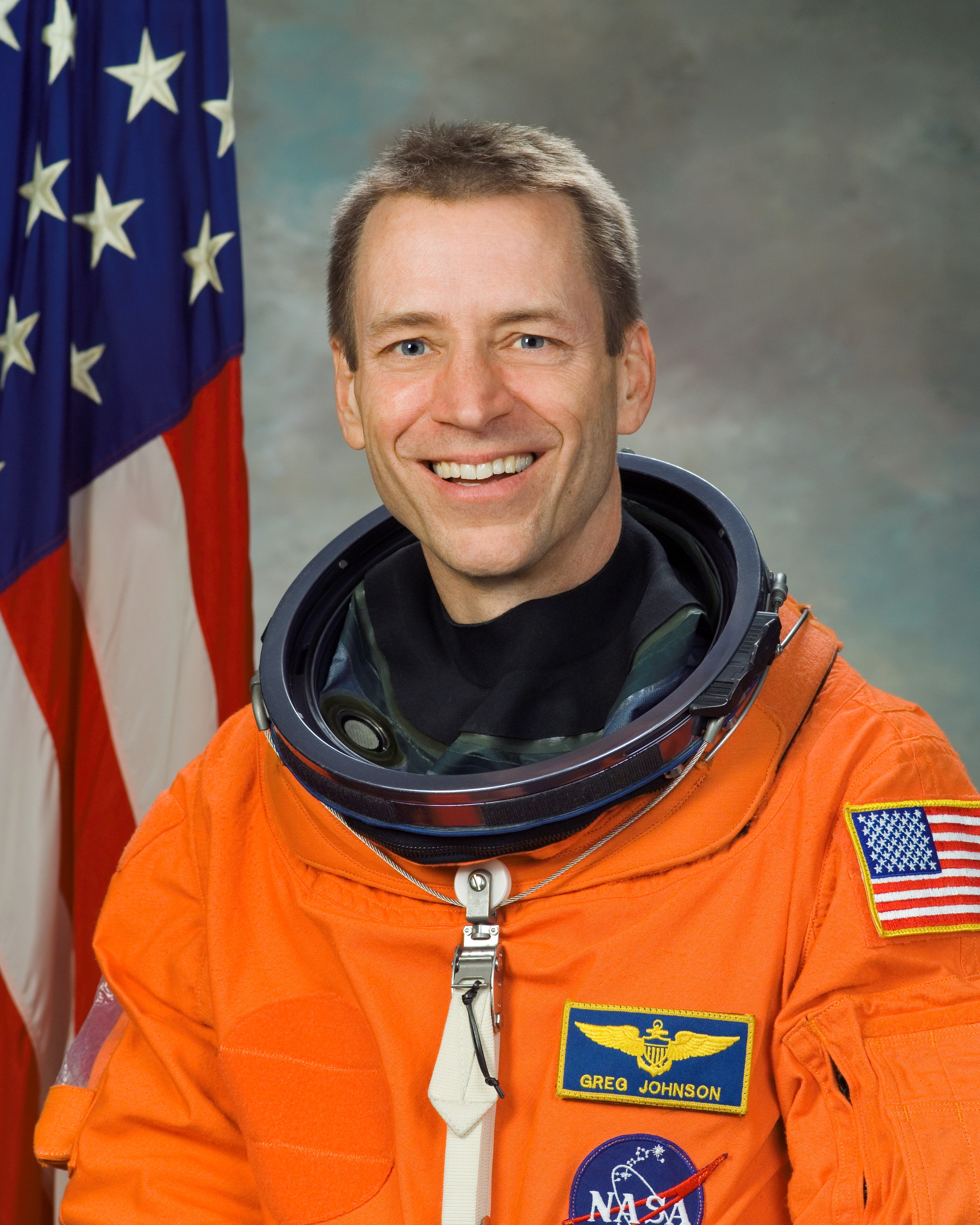
- Born: Gregory Carl Johnson; July 30, 1954 (age 72); Seattle, Washington, U.S.
- Other name: Ray J
- Education: University of Washington (BS)
- Space career

NASA astronaut
- Rank: Captain, USNR
- Time in space: 12d 21h 38m
- Selection: NASA Group 17 (1998)
- Missions: STS-125
- Mission insignia

Gregory Carl Johnson (born July 30, 1954, CAPT, USNR, Ret.), is a retired American naval officer and naval aviator, test pilot, aerospace engineer, and NASA astronaut. He spent his military career in both the regular United States Navy and the Navy Reserve. Johnson was the pilot on Space Shuttle mission STS-125, the final Hubble Space Telescope servicing mission.

== Personal data ==
Johnson was born on July 30, 1954 in Seattle, Washington. He attended and graduated from West Seattle High School in 1972. He received a Bachelor of Science degree in aerospace engineering from the University of Washington in 1977. While in college, he also earned his civilian commercial pilot certificate with multi-engine landplane and single-engine seaplane ratings.

Johnson enjoys athletics, cycling, swimming, and auto repair, and has two grown sons from a previous marriage. He is married to Nanette Faget, who has three children.

== Naval service ==
Johnson received his commission as an ensign in the United States Navy Reserve through Aviation Officer Candidate School at Naval Air Station Pensacola, Florida in September 1977, and received his Naval Aviator wings via the Strike Jet training pipeline in December 1978. Upon completion of flight training, he was designated as a Selectively Retained Graduate (SERGRAD) and spent 1979 and part of 1980 as an instructor pilot in the TA-4J Skyhawk II aircraft.

In 1980, then Lieutenant, junior grade Johnson transferred to Attack Squadron 128 (VA-128), the A-6 Intruder Fleet Replacement Squadron at NAS Whidbey Island, Washington and transitioned to the A-6E Intruder attack bomber. Upon completion of the syllabus at VA-128, he was assigned to Attack Squadron 52 (VA-52), completing two 2 deployments in the Western Pacific and Indian Ocean aboard USS Kitty Hawk. During this time, he was promoted to Lieutenant and selected for augmentation of his commission to the Regular Navy.

In 1984, Johnson reported to the U.S. Air Force Test Pilot School at Edwards Air Force Base, California. After graduation, he reported to Naval Weapons Center China Lake, California, performing flight tests in the A-6E Intruder and F/A-18A Hornet aircraft. Following his flight test tour, then Lieutenant Commander Johnson returned to NAS Whidbey Island for his department head tour in an operational A-6 squadron. Following refresher training and an instructor tour at VA-128, he reported to Attack Squadron 196 (VA-196), serving as both an A-6 pilot/mission commander and the squadron's Aircraft Maintenance Department Head. During this tour he completed another Western Pacific and Indian Ocean deployment as well as a Northern Pacific deployment.

Johnson resigned his Regular Navy commission in 1990 and transferred back to the Naval Reserve while accepting a concurrent civil service position with the National Aeronautics and Space Administration (NASA) at the Johnson Space Center (JSC) Aircraft Operations Division at Ellington Field, Texas. In his concurrent military capacity from 1990 to 2007, he was promoted to Commander and later to Captain in the Navy Reserve and was the Commanding Officer of four Navy Reserve units. He also served as a Senior Research Officer in a Science and Technology Unit of the Office of Naval Research based at the U.S. Naval Postgraduate School in Monterey, California.

He has logged over 10,800 flight hours in 50 aircraft types and has accumulated over 500 carrier landings. He retired from the U.S. Navy with over 30 years of service effective October 1, 2007.

== NASA career ==
In April 1990, Johnson was accepted as an aerospace engineer and research pilot at the NASA JSC Aircraft Operations Division, Ellington Field, Texas. He qualified as a T-38 Talon instructor pilot, functional check flight and examiner pilot, as well as Gulfstream I aircraft commander, WB-57F Canberra high altitude research pilot and KC-135 co-pilot. Additionally, he conducted flight test programs in the T-38 aircraft including JET-A airstart testing, T-38N avionics upgrade testing and the first flight of the T-38 inlet redesign aircraft. In 1994 he assumed duties as the Chief, Maintenance & Engineering Branch responsible for all maintenance and engineering modifications on NASA JSC's 44 aircraft.

Selected by NASA as an astronaut candidate in June 1998, he reported for training in August 1998. Johnson was the class leader for the seventeenth group of astronauts, with 31 U.S. and international members. Johnson was initially assigned as an Astronaut Support Personnel (ASP) responsible for configuring the Orbiter switches prior to launch and strapping astronauts in their seats for launch. More recently he served as the Astronaut Office representative for all technical aspects of orbiter landing and roll out issues. From June 2004 to November 2005, Johnson served as Manager, Launch Integration, for the Space Shuttle program at Kennedy Space Center, Florida. He also served as the Astronaut Office Deputy, Shuttle Branch and Return to Flight Representative.

Johnson graduated with fellow astronaut Gregory H. Johnson, in the 1998 NASA Group 17. Gregory H. served as ascent/reentry CAPCOM on mission STS-125, while Gregory C. piloted STS-125 on Atlantis. They are not related and can be distinguished by their call signs. Gregory H. Johnson is known as "Box", while Gregory C. Johnson is known as "Ray J".

=== Spaceflight experience ===
==== STS-125 ====
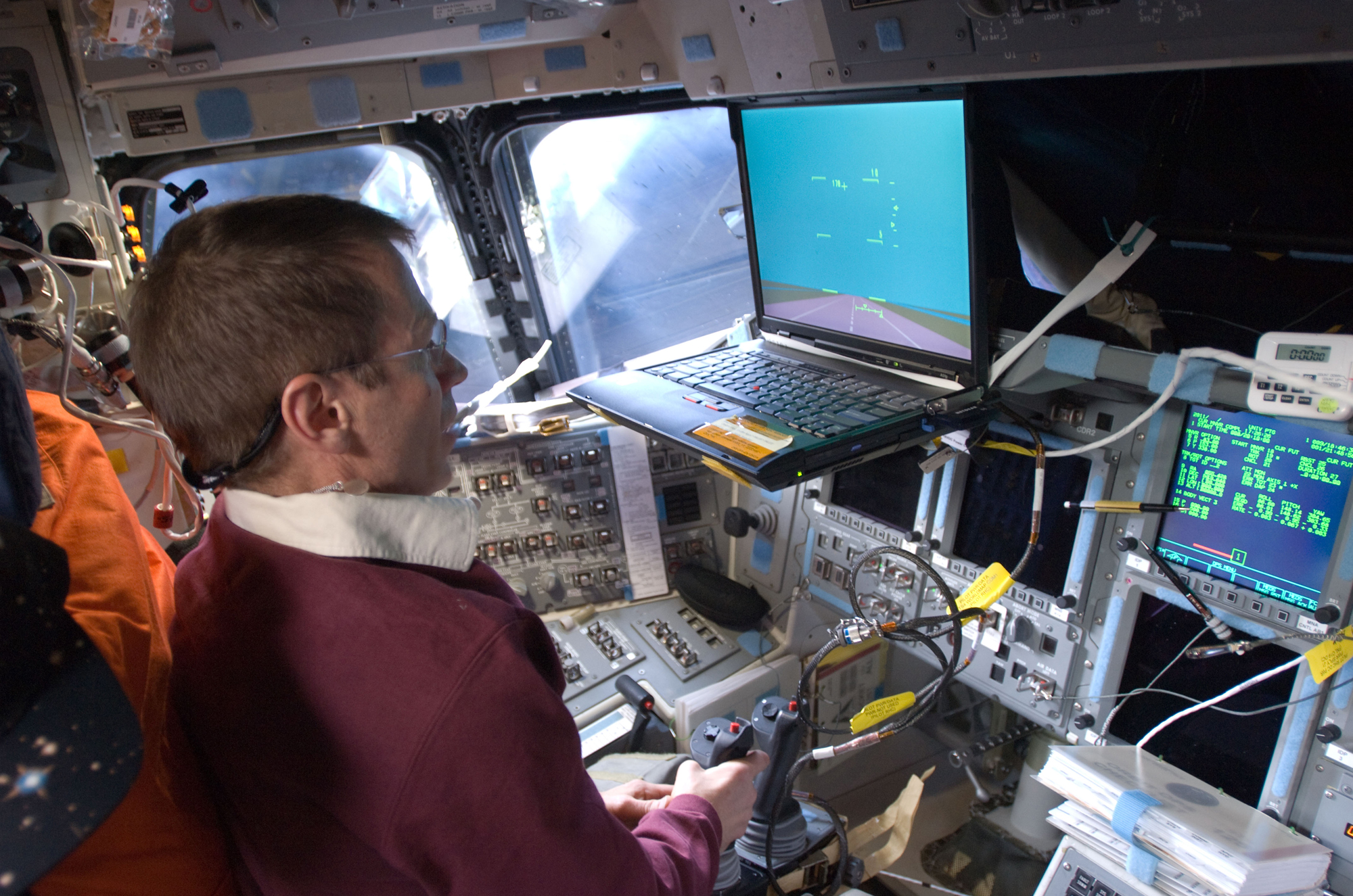
Johnson uses the Portable In-Flight Landing Operations Trainer (PILOT) on the flight deck of the Earth-orbiting Space Shuttle Atlantis during the STS-125 mission

Johnson was the pilot on STS-125, the final Space Shuttle mission to the Hubble Space Telescope. It lasted from May 11–24, 2009, traveling 5,276,000 miles in 197 Earth orbits. Atlantis carried two new instruments to the telescope, the Cosmic Origins Spectrograph and the Wide Field Camera 3. The mission also replaced a Fine Guidance Sensor, six gyroscopes, and two battery unit modules to allow the telescope to continue to function at least through 2014. The crew also installed new thermal blanket insulating panels to provide improved thermal protection, and a soft-capture mechanism that would aid in the safe de-orbiting of the telescope by an unmanned spacecraft at the end of its operational lifespan. The mission also carried an IMAX camera and the crew documented the progress of the mission for the movie Hubble.

== Organizations ==
- Association of Space Explorers
- Society of Experimental Test Pilots
- American Institute of Aeronautics and Astronautics
- Tau Beta Pi Honorary Engineering Society
- Naval Reserve Association
- Tailhook Association

== Awards and honors ==
- NASA James A. Korkowski Excellence in Achievement Award
- VA-128 Attack Pilot of the Year
- Carrier Air Wing Fifteen (CVW-15) Top Ten Tailhook Pilot
- Carrier Air Wing Fourteen (CVW-14) Top Ten Tailhook Pilot
- Meritorious Service Medal (3)
- Navy and Marine Corps Commendation Medal (3)
- Navy and Marine Corps Achievement Medal
- Navy Expeditionary Medal
- National Defense Service Medal (2)
- Armed Forces Expeditionary Medal
- Humanitarian Service Medal
- War on Terrorism Service Medal
- Armed Forces Reserve Medal
- NASA Space Flight Medal

Johnson also received many other awards and decorations.
