= Dell Bull =

United States naval officer (born 1965)

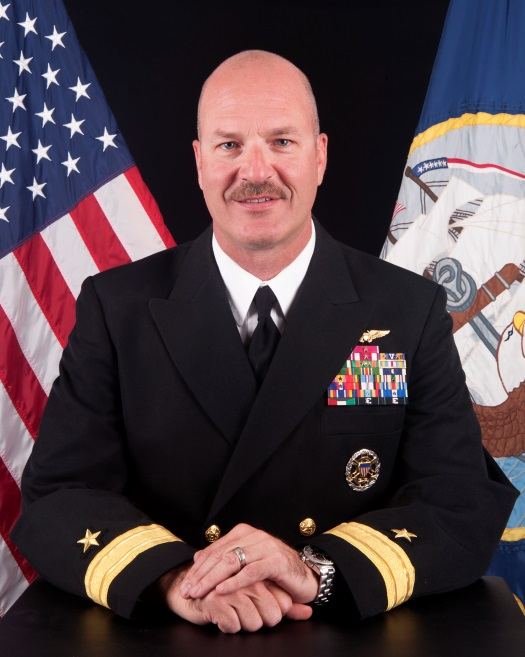
- Born: December 17, 1965 (age 60); Oak Harbor, Washington, U.S.
- Relatives: Rear Admiral Lyle F. Bull (father)
- Military career
- Allegiance: United States
- Branch: United States Navy
- Service years: 1989–2019
- Rank: Rear Admiral
- Commands: Chief of Naval Air Training; Carrier Air Wing 9 F/A-18 West Coast Fleet Replacement Squadron; VFA-122; VFA-41
- Conflicts: Gulf War; War in Afghanistan
- Awards: Legion of Merit (3)

Dell David Bull (born 1965) is a retired United States Navy Rear Admiral and Naval Flight Officer bombardier/navigator currently assigned as Deputy Director for Operations and Intelligence Integration at the Joint Improvised-Threat Defeat Organization (JIDO). He previously served as Special Assistant for Naval Air Systems Command in Washington, D.C. From July 2015 to June 2017, Bull was Chief of Naval Air Training at Naval Air Station Corpus Christi.

== Early life and education ==
Dell Bull was born in 1965 in Oak Harbor, Washington, to Lyle F. Bull and Diana (née Stone). He has three older brothers: Ron, Vince, and Bruce. At the time of Bull's birth, his father had recently separated from the United States Naval Reserve as a Naval Flight Officer Bombardier/Navigator and the family moved for a short period of time to East Moline, Illinois, to be near his parents' respective families. When the navy recruited Bull's father into active duty service in 1965, the family returned to Oak Harbor and Naval Air Station Whidbey Island. He and his brothers attended school there, with Bull graduating from Oak Harbor High School in 1983. Following high school, Bull attended the University of Idaho in Moscow, graduating in 1988 with a Bachelor of Science degree in computer science.

== Navy career ==
=== Naval Flight Officer ===
Following college graduation and Officer Candidate School, Bull received a commission in the United States Navy as an ensign, designated a Naval Flight Officer (NFO) and received his wings in 1989. Bull was assigned to Grumman A-6 Intruder replacement aircrew training at NAS Whidbey Island with VA-128. Bull then received orders to VA-196, also at NAS Whidbey Island and one of the squadrons in which his father served during the Vietnam War, including as executive officer in 1974 when Bull was nine years old. Bull deployed with VA-196 aboard the USS Independence, flying missions during Operation Desert Shield in 1990.

Following Desert Shield and retirement of the A-6 Intruder, Bull selected to transition to the F-14 Tomcat. After replacement aircrew training, he was assigned to VF-101 as one of the first Radar Intercept Officers who had transitioned from another aircraft. Bull later served as an F-14 Replacement Air Group instructor. Following that assignment, he reported to VF-24 and deployed aboard the USS Nimitz to fly missions during Operation Southern Watch. After his tour with VF-24, Bull reported to VF-14 and deployed aboard the USS Theodore Roosevelt. While serving with VF-14, Bull was named Naval Flight Officer of the Year as a result of performance and tactical expertise while in combat.

Bull's flight record includes more than 4,800 flight hours and more than 950 arrested landings.

=== Shore duty ===
Bull's shore duty assignments have included: legislative fellow with Senator John McCain, Senior Policy officer with Homeland Security as part of the Joint Staff, J-34 Anti-Terrorism Office, Aviation Program Manager in the Office of Legislative Affairs, all in Washington, D.C. Bull has also served as chief of staff, Naval Air Force Pacific in San Diego, California, and chief of staff for the commander of the Naval Air Forces, in Washington, D.C.

=== Command assignments ===
Command operational assignments include the Strike Fighter Squadron VFA-41 Black Aces aboard USS Nimitz, VFA-122 Flying Eagles, the west coast F/A-18A-F Fleet Replacement Squadron, and Carrier Air Wing 9 aboard USS John C. Stennis. Bull assumed command of Chief of Naval Air Training in July 2015.

=== Decorations, awards, promotions ===
Bull's decorations and awards include the Legion of Merit with two Gold Stars, the Defense Meritorious Service Medal, two Meritorious Service Medals, three Air Medals with the Combat "V", six Strike/Flight Medals, the Navy and Marine Corps Commendation Medal with a gold star, two Navy Achievement Medals, and various campaign, unit, and service awards.

While at CNAF in San Diego, Captain Bull was promoted to rear admiral in April 2015.

=== Controversy ===
In July 2017, Bull was ordered to report to Washington, D.C., with RADM Jay Bynum taking his place as Chief of Naval Air Training at NAS Corpus Christi. News reports referred to the change of command as "sudden". The change of duty assignments followed the grounding of T-45 Goshawk training jets following safety issues with the cockpit oxygen systems in the aircraft. After numerous reports of hazardous physical symptoms pilots were experiencing while flying the T-45 during training missions due to lack of oxygen, it was determined that contaminants were in the oxygen system. As a result, pilot instructors were refusing to fly and the Navy's entire fleet of 200 training jets were grounded. Instructors and trainees were reported as being dissatisfied with Bull's response to the issues as Chief of Naval Air Training. According to news reports at the time, the pilots felt they were being told by Bull to stand down in their complaints and fly in spite of the unresolved safety issues. Bull expressed his displeasure at the time that the issue had been made public.

When Bull's reassignment was announced, change of command had already occurred. At that time, Bull had written a letter to his staff that stated he was going to Washington, D.C., to lead a team which would "solve problems with Navy and Marine Corps fighter jets."
