= JOPA =

JOPA may refer to:

- Journal of Physics A, a scientific journal published by the Institute of Physics
- "JoPa", nickname of Joe Paterno, college football coach
- Junior Officer Protective (or Protection) Association, an informal organization of lower ranking US Navy officers - see for example Second VA-65 (U.S. Navy)#Desert Storm
