= VA65 =

VA-65 may refer to:

- Attack Squadron 65 (U.S. Navy)
- State Route 65 (Virginia)
