= Philip E. Smith =

American air force officer

- Born: October 15, 1934 (age 91); Roodhouse, Illinois, U.S.
- Military career
- Allegiance: United States of America
- Branch: United States Air Force
- Service years: 1957-87
- Rank: Colonel
- Unit: 436th Tactical Fighter Squadron
- Conflicts: Vietnam War
- Awards: Silver Star; Legion of Merit (3); Bronze Star (2); Purple Heart (2); Meritorious Service Medal (2); Air Medal (2)

Philip Eldon Smith (born 15 October 1934) is a former United States Air Force fighter pilot who was held captive in China for seven and a half years.

== Early life ==
Smith was born in Roodhouse, Illinois. After attending high school he completed a special two year curriculum at the Institute of Aviation, University of Illinois.

== USAF career ==
He joined the United States Air Force and in June 1957, graduated from Air Force Pilot Training. He later flew the F-86F, the F-100 and then the F-104. He volunteered for combat duty and in September 1965 was flying the F-104C with the 436th Tactical Fighter Squadron based at Da Nang Air Base, South Vietnam.

== Capture ==
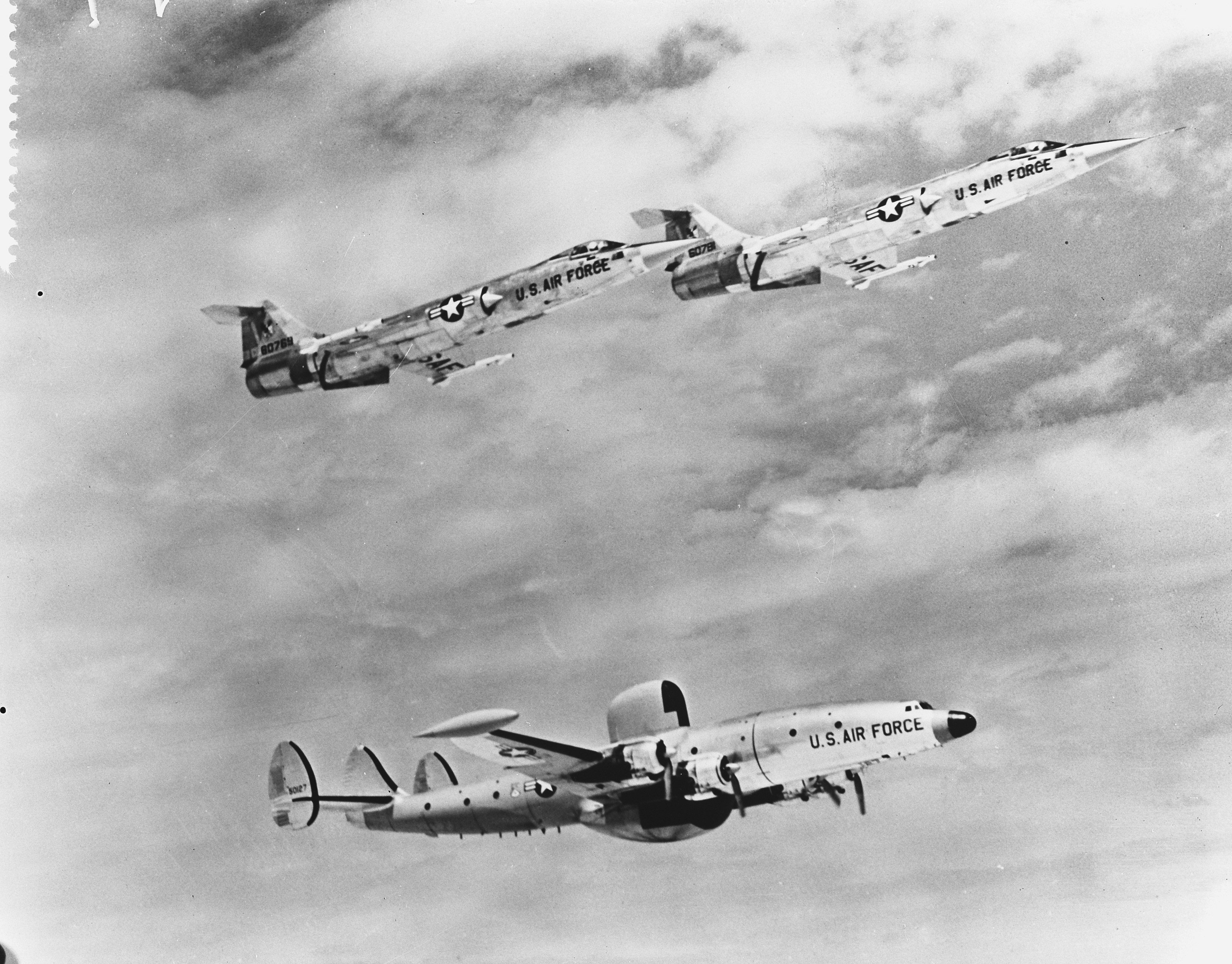
USAF F-104s escort an EC-121, the same mission Smith was performing prior to being shot down

On 20 September 1965 Smith was flying his F-104C #56-883 on a mission to escort an EC-121 over the Gulf of Tonkin when due to equipment failure and incorrect navigational commands he strayed into Chinese airspace over Hainan. His aircraft was intercepted and shot down by two Shenyang J-6 fighters of the People's Liberation Army Naval Air Force near Haikou. Smith ejected successfully and was captured by PLA forces. On 21 September the U.S. military acknowledged that Smith was missing and reported that Smith had radioed that he was experiencing mechanical problems and fuel shortage, but did not confirm that he had been shot down.

He was first taken to Guangzhou for interrogation and then later transferred to Beijing. Most of his captivity was spent in solitary confinement; however, he did meet John T. Downey and Richard Fecteau both of whom were CIA agents captured in 1952.

== Release ==
Due to improving US-China relations following President Richard Nixon's historic 1972 visit to China, Smith and United States Navy Commander Robert J. Flynn who was shot down in 1967 were released on 15 March 1973, crossing the land border into the British Hong Kong where they were received by a representative of the American Red Cross and U.S. consular officials. Both men were then flown by helicopter to Kai Tak Airport and then flown to Clark Air Base in The Philippines where they were processed together with U.S. prisoners of war released from North Vietnam as part of Operation Homecoming.

== Post-release ==
Smith returned to USAF duty and retired with the rank of Colonel in December 1987.

== Awards and decorations ==
His awards include:

United States Air Force Command Pilot Badge
Silver Star	Legion of Merit with 2 bronze oak leaf clusters	Bronze Star Medal with Valor device and bronze oak leaf cluster
Purple Heart with bronze oak leaf cluster	Meritorious Service Medal with bronze oak leaf cluster	Air Medal with bronze oak leaf cluster
Air Force Outstanding Unit Award with bronze oak leaf cluster	Air Force Organizational Excellence Award	Prisoner of War Medal
Combat Readiness Medal	Army Good Conduct Medal	National Defense Service Medal
Armed Forces Expeditionary Medal with service star	Vietnam Service Medal with 3 silver and 1 bronze campaign stars	Air Force Overseas Short Tour Service Ribbon with silver and bronze oak leaf clusters
Air Force Overseas Long Tour Service Ribbon with 3 bronze oak leaf clusters	Air Force Longevity Service Award with 1 silver and 2 bronze oak leaf clusters	Small Arms Expert Marksmanship Ribbon
Air Force Training Ribbon	Vietnam Gallantry Cross Unit Citation	Vietnam Campaign Medal
