= Hotel Roodhouse =

- U.S. National Register of Historic Places
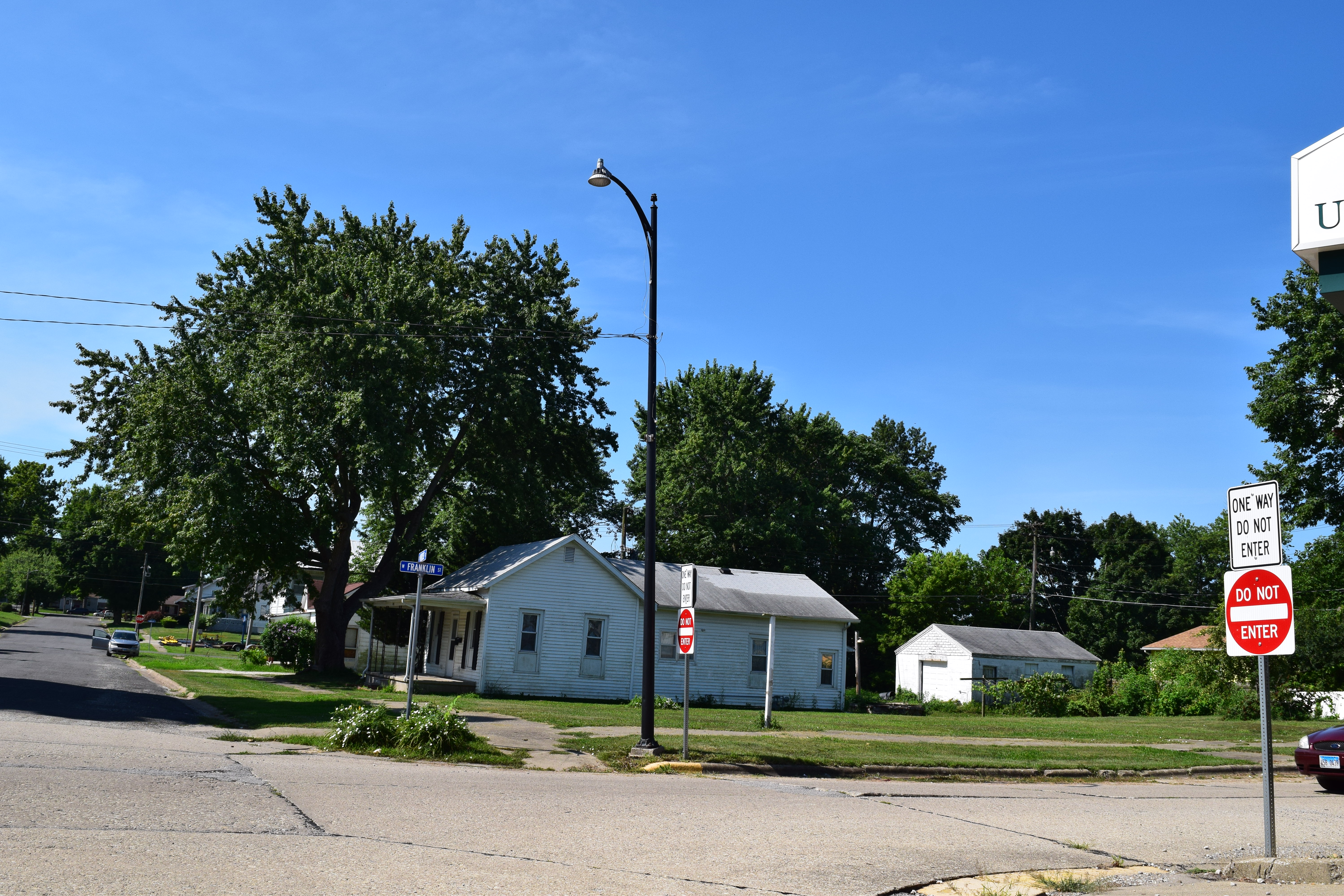
- Site of the hotel

- Location within Illinois Location within the United States
- Location: 303 Morse St., Roodhouse, Illinois
- Coordinates: 39°28′56″N 90°22′22″W
- Area: less than one acre
- Built: 1895
- Architectural style: Queen Anne, Romanesque
- NRHP reference No.: 95001238
- Added to NRHP: November 7, 1995

The Hotel Roodhouse was a historic hotel located at 303 Morse St. in Roodhouse, Illinois. John Roodhouse, the founder of the city, opened the hotel in 1895. The hotel is a 2 1/2-story building with Queen Anne and Romanesque influences. It was one of several hotels in Roodhouse which served travelers on the Chicago and Alton Railroad and the last such hotel to stand, before collapsing. The Hotel Roodhouse's amenities included a dining room, smoking rooms, lounges, and a showroom for traveling salesmen. During the Great Depression, the hotel also hosted a local soup kitchen.

The hotel was added to the National Register of Historic Places on November 7, 1995. While it is no longer standing, it remains on the National Register.
