= 436th Tactical Fighter Training Squadron =

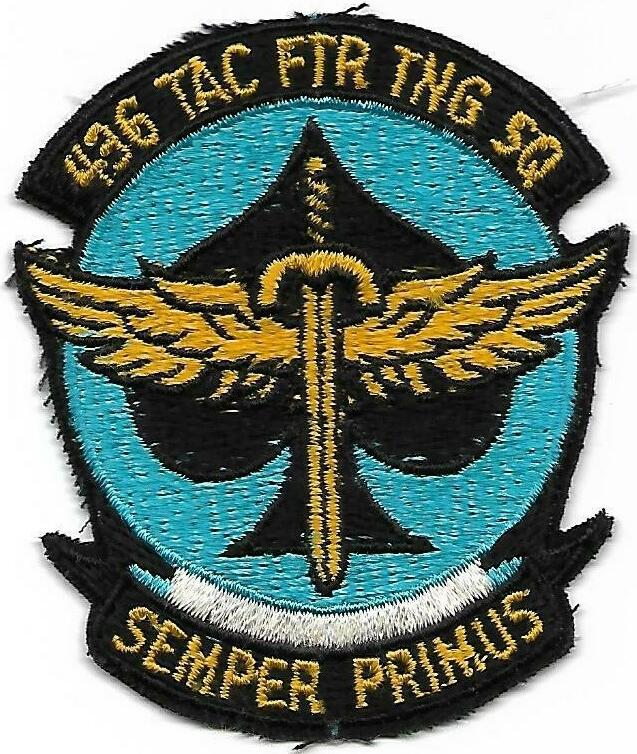
- 436th Tactical Fighter Training Squadron – Emblem
- Active: 1943–1991
- Country: United States
- Branch: United States Air Force
- Type: Fighter

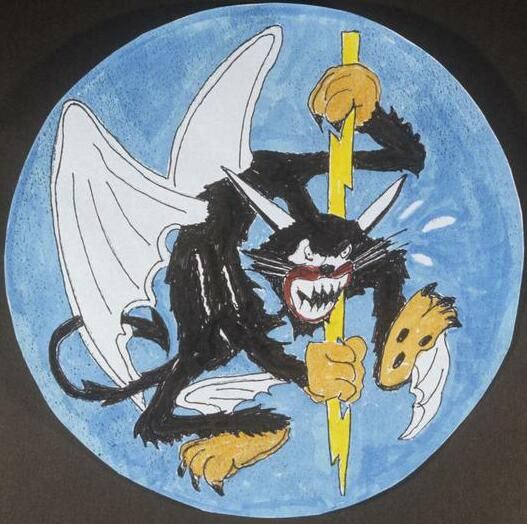
World War II Squadron Emblem

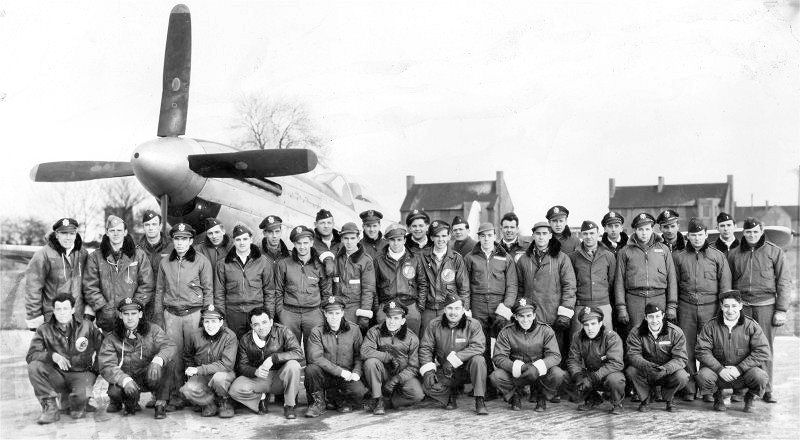
Squadron photo – Early 1945

The 436th Tactical Fighter Training Squadron is an inactive United States Air Force unit. Its last was assigned to the 479th Fighter Group, stationed at Holloman AFB, New Mexico. It was inactivated on 2 August 1991.

== History ==
=== World War II ===
Activated on 15 October 1943 at Grand Central Air Terminal, near Long Beach, California. Equipped with the Lockheed P-38F Lightning, trained for combat and served as an air defense organization for the west coast as part of IV Fighter Command.

Even though the defense of the US west coast initially took priority, it was decided to deploy Lightning squadrons to Britain for heavy bomber escort duty. The squadron was reassigned to RAF Wattisham, England, April–May 1944, and assigned to VIII Fighter Command, Eighth Air Force.

From England, the squadron escorted heavy bombers during operations against targets on the Continent, strafed targets of opportunity, and flew fighter-bomber, counter-air, and area-patrol missions. Engaged primarily in B-17/B-24 escort activities and fighter sweeps until the Normandy invasion in June 1944.

Patrolled the beachhead during the invasion. Strafed and dive-bombed troops, bridges, locomotives, railway cars, barges, vehicles, airfields, gun emplacements, flak towers, ammunition dumps, power stations, and radar sites while on escort or fighter-bomber missions as the Allies drove across France during the summer and fall of 1944. The unit flew area patrols to support the breakthrough at Saint-Lô in July and the airborne attack on the Netherlands in September. The unit continued escort and fighter-bomber activities from October to mid-December 1944. It converted to P-51s between 10 September and 1 October, using both types on missions until conversion was completed.

Participated in the Battle of the Bulge (December 1944 – January 1945) by escorting bombers to and from targets in the battle area and by strafing transportation targets while on escort duty. From February to April 1945 it continued to fly escort missions, but also provided area patrols to support the airborne attack across the Rhine in March.

Returned to Camp Kilmer New Jersey in November 1945, and was inactivated in December 1945.

=== Cold War ===
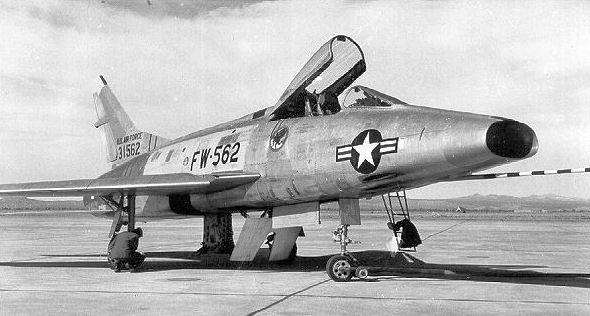
F-100A-10-NA 53-1562

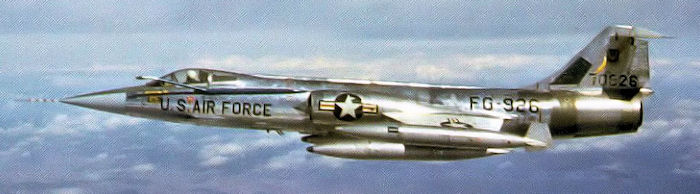
Lockheed F-104C-5-LO Starfighter 57-926 about 1960.

On 1 December 1952 the unit was reactivated at George AFB, California. Inheriting F-51D Mustangs from the federalized Air National Guard units. In February 1953 upgrading to the North American F-86H Sabre jet aircraft. Was one of the first USAF wings to be equipped with the North American F-100A Super Sabre, receiving its first aircraft in November 1953. Became operationally ready with the F-100A on 29 September 1954.

Since the F-100A was not considered as a truly effective air superiority fighter, the service life of the type with the USAF was rather brief, most aircraft being phased out of the active USAF inventory beginning in 1958. Beginning in October 1958, was reequipped with the Lockheed F-104 Starfighter. The Starfighter was primarily intended for a nuclear strike, but Tactical Air Command wanted to use it to carry out ground attack missions with conventional weapons.

However the F-104 was not really well-suited to USAF needs, being deficient in range, endurance, and offensive capability. In addition, it lacked true all-weather capability. The excellent flying weather in Southern California gave the squadron a new mission to train F-104 pilots from West Germany, Canada, the Netherlands and Italy during January 1962 – August 1963 as a result of the large foreign sales.

Deployed to Kung Kuan Air Base, Taiwan. From its base in Taiwan, the squadron began a regular rotation to Da Nang Air Base, South Vietnam where its mission was to fly MiG combat air patrol (MiGCAP) missions to protect USAF F-100 fighter bombers against attack by North Vietnamese fighters. The effect of F-104 deployment upon NVN and PRC MiG operations was immediate and dramatic. NVN MiGs soon learned to avoid contact with USAF strikes being covered by the F-104s. During the entire deployment of the 436th only two fleeting encounters between F-104Cs and enemy fighters occurred.

As the MiG threat abated, the 436th TFS was tasked with some weather reconnaissance and ground attack missions. A few of these were against targets in North Vietnam, but most of them were close air-support missions against targets in the South under forward air controller direction. The F-104s were fairly successful in this role, gaining a reputation for accuracy in their cannon fire and their bombing and capable of quite rapid reaction times in response to requests for air support. During this period, the 436th F-104s maintained an in-commission rate of 94.7%, a testimony both to the quality of 436th maintenance personnel and to the simplicity and maintainability of F-104 systems. However, an F-104 went down during a sortie 100 nm SSW of DaNang on 29 June. The pilot was rescued with minor injuries.

The 436th TFS had a bad day on 20 September 1965. F-104C pilot Major Philip E. Smith managed to get lost while flying an EC-121 escort mission over the Gulf of Tonkin. After several equipment failures and incorrect steering commands, he managed to wander over Hainan Island and was shot down by a pair of Chinese MiG-19s (J-6s). He ejected and was taken prisoner. While the rest of the squadron was out looking for Major Smith, two other F-104s had a midair collision while returning to their base. Both pilots ejected and were recovered unharmed.

A week later, another F-104C was shot down by enemy AAA, and its pilot was killed. After these four losses, the remnants of the 436th were rotated back to George in November 1965.

In December 1965, the wing began transitioning to the F-4 Phantom II with a mission of F-4 replacement pilot training. Was reassigned to the provisional 4531st Tactical Fighter WinG at Homestead AFB, Florida in 1968. Squadron flew air defense missions over south Florida until October 1970 with assets of 560th TFW assigned to squadron until 31 October 1970 and inactivated.

Was reactivated at Holloman AFB, 1 January 1977 to provide Lead-In Fighter Training (LIFT) training for pilots assigned to fly the McDonnell Douglas F-15 Eagle. The 436th Flew AT-38B Talons. inactivated on 15 November 1991, with the training mission and aircraft being consolidated under the 586th Flight Training Squadron.

=== Lineage ===
- Constituted 436th Fighter Squadron on 12 Oct 1943

Activated on 15 Oct 1943
Inactivated on 21 Dec 1945

- Re-designated 436th Fighter-Bomber Squadron on 15 Oct 1952

Activated on 1 Dec 1952
Re-designated: 436th Fighter-Day Squadron on 15 Feb 1954
Re-designated: 436th Tactical Fighter Squadron on 1 Jul 1958
Inactivated: 8 March 1971

- Re-designated: 436th Tactical Fighter Training Squadron, 1 January 1977

Inactivated 2 August 1991.

=== Assignments ===
- 479th Fighter Group, 15 Oct 1943
- VIII Fighter Command, 1–21 Dec 1945
- 479th Fighter-Bomber (later Fighter-Day) Group, 1 Dec 1952
- 479th Fighter-Day (later Tactical Fighter) Wing, 8 Oct 1957

Attached: Iceland Air Defense Force 1 December 1952 – 27 March 1953
Attached: 16th Air Force 11 August – 11 December 1960
Attached: 86th Air Division 18 January – 12 April 1962
Attached: 65th Air Division 3 August – 17 October 1962
Attached: 65th Air Division 11 December 1962 – 3 April 1963
Attached: 65th Air Division 15–30 November 1963
Attached: 2d Air Division 12 July – 12 October 1965

- 4531st Tactical Fighter Wing, 15 July 1968
- 31st Tactical Fighter Wing, 15 October 1970 (not manned or equipped)
- 479th Tactical Fighter Wing, 30 October 1970 – 8 March 1971
- 479th Tactical Training Wing, 1 January 1977
- 479th Fighter Group, 26 July – 2 August 1991

=== Stations ===
- Grand Central Air Terminal, California, 15 Oct 1943
- Palmdale Army Airfield, California, 6 Feb 1944
- Santa Maria Army Airfield, California, 8–16 Apr 1944
- RAF Wattisham (AAF-377) (9B), England, 15 May 1944 – 12 Dec 1945
- Camp Kilmer, New Jersey, 20–21 Dec 1945
- George AFB, California, 1 Dec 1952 – 15 July 1968

Operated from Keflavik Airport, Iceland, 1 December 1952 – 27 March 1953
Operated from Ramstein AB, West Germany, 16 January – 12 April 1962
Operated from Torrejon AB, Spain, 3 August – 17 October 1962
Operated from Torrejon AB, Spain, 11 December 1962 – 3 April 1963
Operated from Torrejon AB, Spain, 15–30 November 1963
Operated from Da Nang AB, South Vietnam, 12 July – 12 October 1965

- Homestead AFB, Florida, 15 July 1968 – 30 October 1970
- George AFB, California, 30 October 1970 – 8 March 1971
- Holloman AFB, New Mexico, 1 January 1977 – 2 August 1991

=== Aircraft ===
- P-40 Warhawk, 1943–1944
- P-38 Lightning, 1944
- P-51D Mustang, 1944–1945
- F-51D Mustang, 1952–1953
- F-86 Sabre, 1953–1955
- F-100 Super Sabre, 1954–1959
- F-104 Starfighter, 1959–1970
- T-38 Talon, 1977–1991
