= Roodhouse, Illinois =

- City
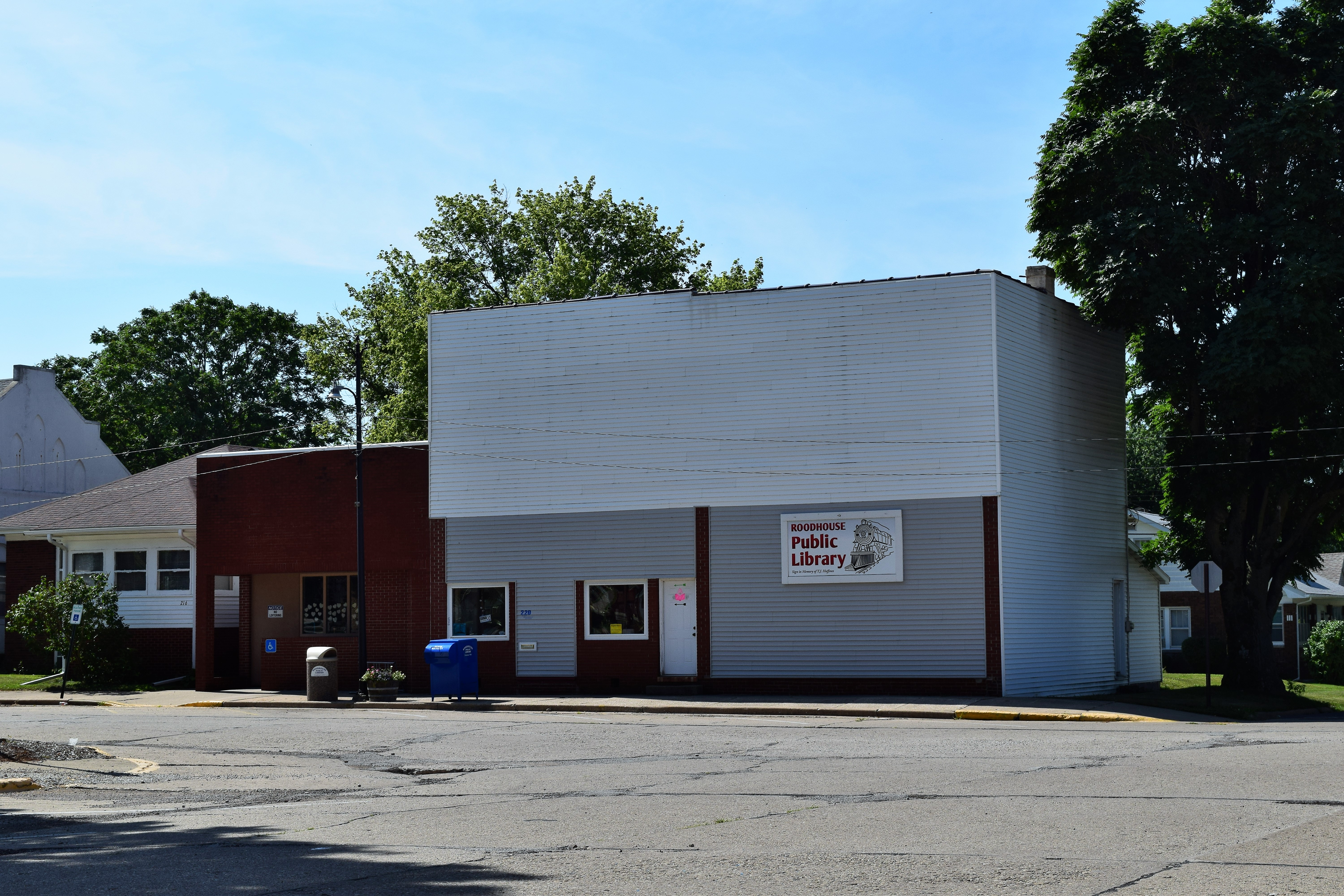
- Roodhouse Public Library

- Location of Roodhouse in Greene County, Illinois.
- Coordinates: 39°29′02″N 90°22′36″W
- Country: United States
- State: Illinois
- County: Greene
- Township: Roodhouse

Area
  - Total: 1.13 sq mi (2.92 km^{2})
  - Land: 1.13 sq mi (2.92 km^{2})
  - Water: 0 sq mi (0.00 km^{2})
- Elevation: 656 ft (200 m)

Population (2020)
  - Total: 1,578
  - Density: 1,400.2/sq mi (540.62/km^{2})
- Time zone: UTC-6 (CST)
  - Summer (DST): UTC-5 (CDT)
- ZIP code: 62082
- Area code: 217
- FIPS code: 17-65481
- GNIS feature ID: 2396424

Roodhouse is a city in Greene County, Illinois, United States. The population was 1,578 at the 2020 census.

== History ==
Roodhouse was founded in the 1850s by John Roodhouse. The community was originally known as "The Crossroads" for its position on two major highways, though it was later renamed for its founder. In 1860, John Rawlins convinced the Chicago and Alton Railway to open a station in the community by promising to secure local funds for the depot and warehouse. The railway built its Louisiana branch from Roodhouse in 1871, and the city became a major junction point, boosting its population and economy. Roodhouse was legally incorporated as a city in 1880. Passenger railroad service to Roodhouse ended in the 1950s, causing a local economic downturn which persisted over the following decades.

The Hotel Roodhouse, the city's only surviving hotel from the railroad era, is listed on the National Register of Historic Places.

== Geography ==
Roodhouse is located in northern Greene County. U.S. Route 67 passes through the center of the city, leading north 22 miles (35 km) to Jacksonville and south 13 miles (21 km) to Carrollton, the Greene County seat.

According to the 2021 census gazetteer files, Roodhouse has a total area of 1.13 square miles (2.93 km^{2}), all land.

== Demographics ==
Historical population
Census	Pop.	Note	%±
1890	2,360		—
1900	2,351		−0.4%
1910	2,171		−7.7%
1920	2,928		34.9%
1930	2,621		−10.5%
1940	2,557		−2.4%
1950	2,368		−7.4%
1960	2,352		−0.7%
1970	2,357		0.2%
1980	2,364		0.3%
1990	2,139		−9.5%
2000	2,214		3.5%
2010	1,814		−18.1%
2020	1,578		−13.0%
U.S. Decennial Census

=== 2020 census ===
As of the 2020 census, there were 1,578 people residing in the city. The population density was 1,400.18 inhabitants per square mile (540.61/km^{2}). There were 792 housing units at an average density of 702.75 per square mile (271.33/km^{2}).

The median age was 39.5 years. 23.6% of residents were under the age of 18 and 17.6% were 65 years of age or older. For every 100 females, there were 94.6 males, and for every 100 females age 18 and over, there were 94.0 males age 18 and over.

0.0% of residents lived in urban areas, while 100.0% lived in rural areas.

There were 662 households, of which 27.9% had children under the age of 18 living in them. Of all households, 36.7% were married-couple households, 20.1% were households with a male householder and no spouse or partner present, and 31.0% were households with a female householder and no spouse or partner present. About 32.5% of all households were made up of individuals and 16.3% had someone living alone who was 65 years of age or older.

Of the 792 housing units, 16.4% were vacant. The homeowner vacancy rate was 5.5% and the rental vacancy rate was 11.7%.

Racial composition as of the 2020 census
Race	Number	Percent
White	1,487	94.2%
Black or African American	1	0.1%
American Indian and Alaska Native	0	0.0%
Asian	2	0.1%
Native Hawaiian and Other Pacific Islander	0	0.0%
Some other race	6	0.4%
Two or more races	82	5.2%
Hispanic or Latino (of any race)	21	1.3%

=== Income and poverty ===
The median income for a household in the city was $38,977, and the median income for a family was $51,118. Males had a median income of $30,069 versus $23,958 for females. The per capita income for the city was $20,551. About 17.7% of families and 26.4% of the population were below the poverty line, including 36.2% of those under age 18 and 8.6% of those age 65 or over.
