= Second VA-65 (U.S. Navy) =

Attack Squadron 65
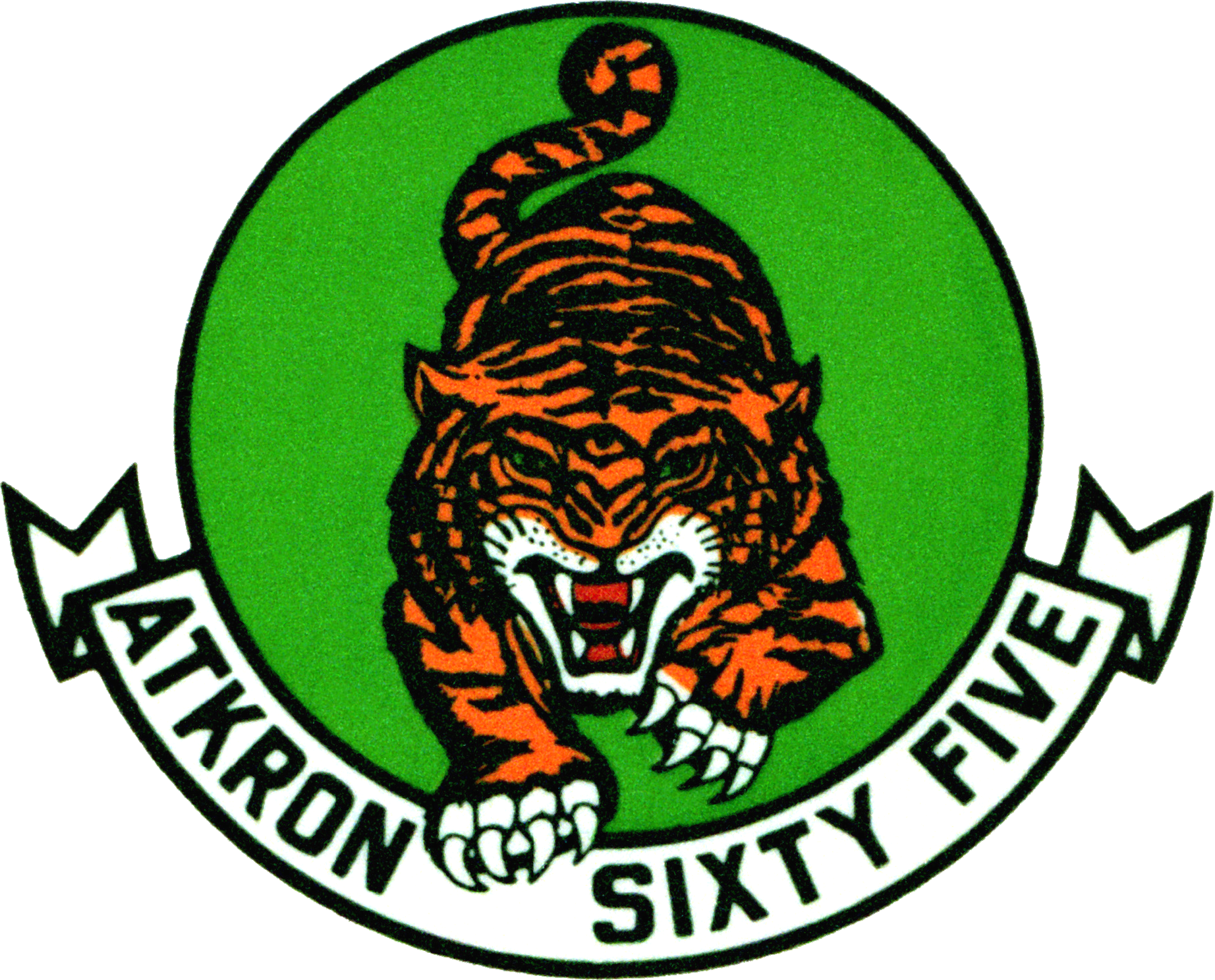
- Attack Squadron 65 patch (1984)
- Active: 1945 – 31 March 1993
- Country: United States of America
- Branch: United States Navy
- Type: All Weather Attack
- Base: NAS Oceana
- Nickname(s): Tigers
- Colors: Orange and Black
- Mascot(s): Tiger and JOBU
- Engagements: Cuban Missile Crisis; Vietnam War; 1980 Hostage Crisis; First Lebanon War; Persian Gulf War

Attack Squadron 65 (VA-65), nicknamed The World Famous Fighting Tigers, was an attack squadron of the United States Navy. The squadron was established as Torpedo Squadron VT-74 in 1945, redesignated as VA-2B in 1946, as VA-25 on 1 September 1948, and finally redesignated VA-65 on 1 July 1959. It was disestablished in 1993. Known as "The World Famous Fighting Tigers", VA-65 was one of the last medium attack squadrons to fly the A-6 Intruder and the A-1 Skyraider. It was the second squadron to be designated VA-65, the first VA-65 was redesignated from VA-6B on 27 July 1948 and would be redesignated as VA-25 on 1 July 1959.

== History ==
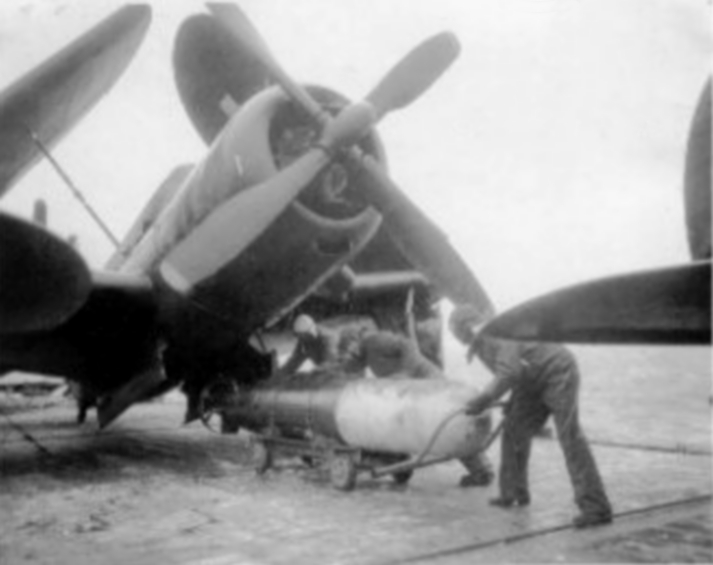
VT-74 Helldiver on the USS Midway in 1946

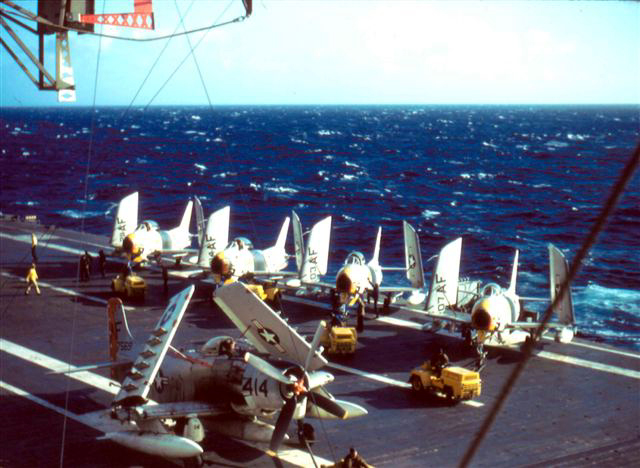
VA-25 AD-6 on the USS Intrepid in 1957

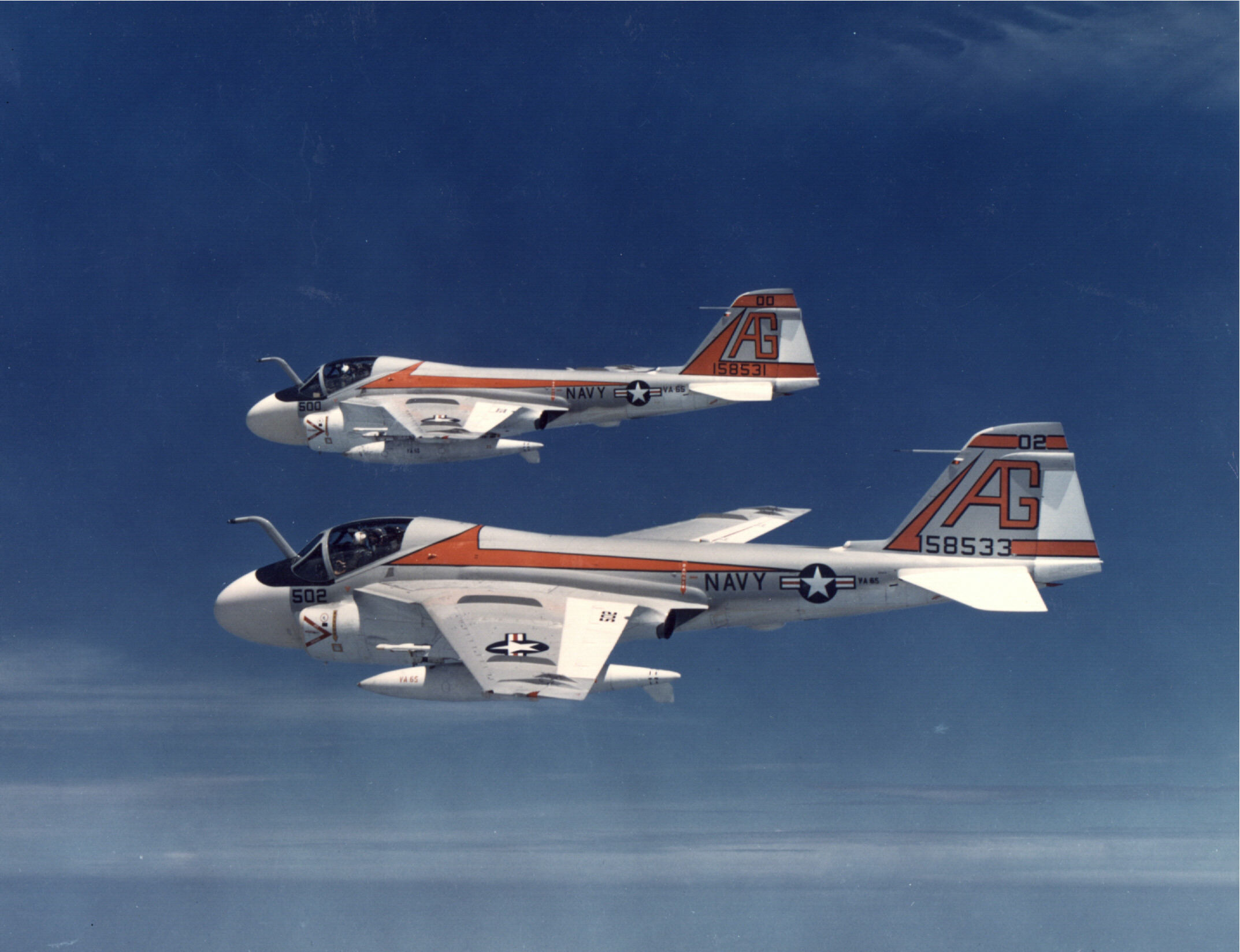
VA-65 A-6Es in 1972

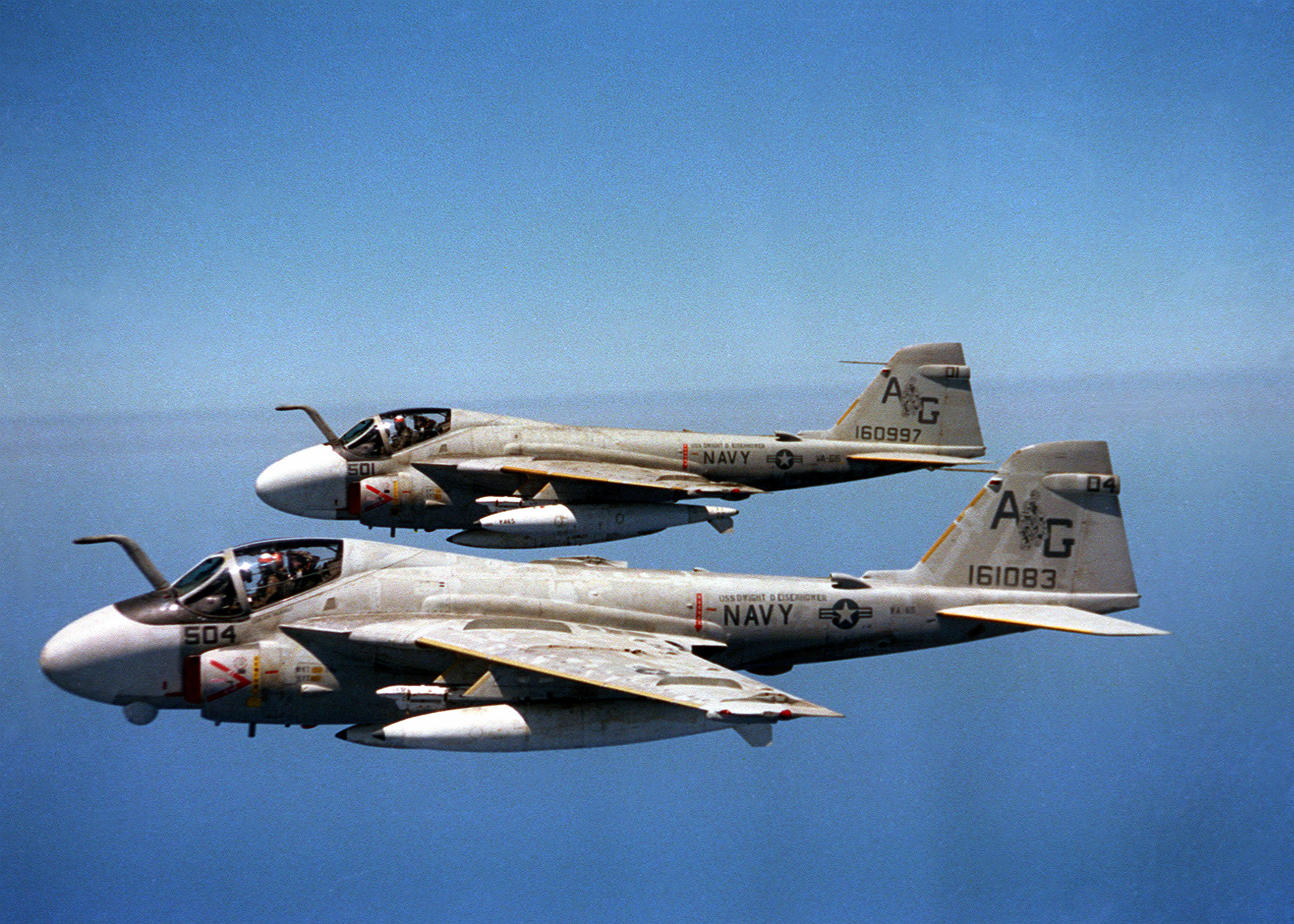
Two A-6Es of VA-65 in 1987

- 7 November 1945: Squadron embarked on USS Midway for her shakedown cruise. The squadron had originally been established for the purpose of being part of the Midway Air Group.
- July–August 1948: The squadron participated in operation CAMID III, close air support for amphibious landings. During this operation the squadron became the first VA unit in the Atlantic Fleet to fire Tiny Tim rockets.
- 1–20 June 1961: Following a four-hour notice for an emergency deployment, VA-65 deployed to the Caribbean Sea aboard USS Intrepid due to unsettled conditions in the Dominican Republic following the assassination of Rafael Trujillo.
- 3 August–11 October 1962: VA-65 was aboard for the maiden cruise of the USS Enterprise, during her deployment to the Mediterranean Sea.
- 19 October–6 December 1962: VA-65 was back at sea aboard Enterprise one week after returning from a Med cruise and headed for the Caribbean Sea due to the Cuban Missile Crisis. The squadron participated in the naval quarantine of Cuba.
- 31 July–3 October 1964: The squadron participated in Operation Sea Orbit as part of Carrier Air Wing Six aboard Enterprise. This operation was an around-the-world voyage of a task force composed of all nuclear powered ships.
- 15 Jun 1966: VA-65 conducted its first combat sortie during the Vietnam War flying from USS Constellation
- 1 July 1966: VA-65's aircraft joined other Carrier Air Wing Fifteen aircraft in attacking and sinking three North Vietnamese patrol vessels that were approaching USS Coontz at high speed.
- 25–31 October 1966: Due to the inclement weather, the squadron's all-weather A-6As flew 37 percent of all Yankee Team sorties against North Vietnam.
- 29 July 1967: VA-65 personnel were among those killed or injured during the USS Forrestal fire
- July–December 1967: Due to the fire on the USS Forrestal and her departure from combat duty on Yankee Station, VA-65 sent a detachment (Det-64) to the Constellation to augment VA-196 for the remainder of the ship's 1967 combat tour in Vietnam.
- May–June 1969: USS Kitty Hawk, with VA-65 aboard, relieved Enterprise in the Sea of Japan. Enterprise had been ordered to operate in the area as a result of the shoot down of a Navy EC-121 reconnaissance aircraft by the North Koreans. VA-65 conducted operations in the area during this two-month period.
- 9 September–5 October 1970: VA-65 operated from USS Independence on Bravo Station off the coast of Israel as a result of the crisis in Jordan and the hijacking of three commercial airliners.
- 7 October–3 November & 9–21 November 1973: After the outbreak of the Yom Kippur War, VA-65 operated from Independence in an area southwest of Crete and provided tanker support to fighter aircraft escorting Air Force One on Secretary of State Kissinger's mission to Israel as well as tanker support for A-4 Skyhawks being ferried to Israel from the United States.
- 4–22 August 1974: Independence, with VA-65 embarked, operated between Crete and Cyprus in response to the 1974 Cypriot coup d'état and the death of the American Ambassador to Cyprus at the hands of anti- American demonstrators.
- 12 March 1975: During exercises in the Caribbean Sea, VA-65 conducted cross deck operations with HMS Ark Royal.
- November 1975: During the NATO exercise Ocean Safari in the North Atlantic, the squadron once again conducted cross deck operations with HMS Ark Royal.
- 15 April 1980: VA-65 deployed aboard USS Dwight D. Eisenhower to the Indian Ocean after Iranians took the American Embassy personnel hostage.
- 22 December 1980: VA-65 returned from its deployment that included only one port visit of five days in duration and a total of 246 days at sea.
- 24 June 1982: VA-65 provided support during the evacuation of American and foreign civilians from Beirut, Lebanon.
- 7 March 1985: VA-65 and Dwight D. Eisenhower cut short a port visit to Palma, Spain and departed on a high speed transit to the Eastern Mediterranean due to the increased tension in Lebanon. The squadron operated in the vicinity of Lebanon until early April.
- 1 September 1986: VA-65 was assigned to CVW-13 and USS Coral Sea as part of the Coral Sea Concept whereby two A-6 Intruder squadrons would be part of the air wing and share a common aircraft maintenance department. The concept was intended to reduce the number of personnel needed to support the squadrons.
- 29 September 1987: VA-65 deployed to the Mediterranean Sea aboard Coral Sea as the first Night Vision Goggle (NVG) capable A-6 squadron.
- August–September 1989: Coral Sea, with VA-65 embarked, was ordered to operate off the coast of Lebanon following terrorist claims to have killed an American hostage, Lieutenant Colonel William R. Higgins, and the capture of Sheik Obeid from Lebanon by Israeli forces. The unstable situation in Lebanon ultimately led to the evacuation of the American Embassy. Squadron aircraft flew missions in support of the evacuation.
- January–February 1990: The squadron was embarked on USS Abraham Lincoln for her shakedown cruise.
- January–February 1991: Deployed aboard the USS Theodore Roosevelt, the squadron participated in Operation Desert Storm, the liberation of Kuwait from Iraqi forces. Squadron aircraft struck targets in Iraq, Iraqi forces in Kuwait, and Iraqi naval units. The squadron claimed the destruction (sinking) of 22 Iraqi naval vessels during the conflict.
- April–May 1991: VA-65 participated in Operation Provide Comfort, flying close air support sorties over Northern Iraq in support of the 24th Marine Expeditionary Unit's mission to aid the Kurdish refugees in Iraq. On the final cruise, a "final checker" was sucked into an engine inlet, and was caught on the carrier close circuit TV. Subsequently, this video was shown on multiple TV video shows. The crew member survived, as his shoulder jammed into the "bullet" of the engine, and due to the quick thinking and training of the aircrew and deck crew, they were able to shut down before he was sucked down through the blades. His cranial and radio equipment were sucked in, and destroyed the engine. Later that night bandaged and bruised he appeared on the closed circuit TV station with the Roosevelt's CO, and discussed his ordeal.
- 26 March 1993: The squadron held a disestablishment ceremony at NAS Oceana, it was officially disestablished on 31 March 1993.

=== Insignia and "The Beast" nickname ===
The squadron's first insignia was approved by CNO on 9 August 1945. During the time when the squadron's insignia was approved, VT-74 was flying the SB2C which was nicknamed "The Beast". Consequently, the squadron's insignia took on the shape of a beast riding a torpedo. There is no record of the colors used for this insignia.

After VT-74 was redesignated VA-2B, it continued to use the old insignia until 17 April 1947 when CNO approved a new insignia for the squadron. The insignia adopted by VA-2B reflected the squadron's new attack mission. The horsehead chess piece was designed to relate the squadron's power to that of a medieval knight and the fleur-de-lis represented integrity. Colors for the insignia were: a yellow background; red scroll with yellow lettering, black banner with a black and white pole; white knight with a yellow collar; a white lightning bolt; and the Fleur-de-lis was red with a black band.

The Knight insignia continued as the official insignia for the squadron following its redesignation to VA-25 on 1 September 1948. A new insignia for VA-25 was approved by CNO on 4 April 1950. The new insignia was a front view of a tiger on the prowl. Colors were: yellow background; brown tiger with green eyes, and white teeth, whiskers and claws; and a red tongue and mouth. When VA-25 was redesignated VA-65 in 1959 the tiger insignia was retained and remained VA-65's insignia until its disestablishment. Nickname: Tigers 1950–1993.

== Home port assignments ==
- Naval Auxiliary Air Field Otis, Camp Edwards, Massachusetts 1 May 1945
- Naval Air Station Norfolk October 1945
- Naval Auxiliary Air Field Charlestown February 1946
- Naval Air Station Oceana June 1946
- Coast Guard Air Station Elizabeth City 20 November 1950
- Naval Auxiliary Air Station/Naval Air Station Oceana* 20 September 1951 NAAS Oceana was redesignated NAS Oceana on 1 April 1952.

== Aircraft assignment ==
- Curtiss SB2C-4E Helldiver May 1945
- Curtiss SB2C-4E Helldiver July 1945
- Curtiss SB2C-5 Helldiver February 1946
- Grumman TBM-3E Avenger February 1946
- Grumman SBW-5 Avenger 1946
- North American SNJ-4 July 1947
- Douglas AD-1 Skyraider July 1947
- Douglas AD-4 Skyraider 1 December 1949
- Douglas AD-6/A-1H Skyraider October 1953
- Grumman A-6A Intruder March 1965
- Grumman A-6B Intruder December 1968
- Grumman KA-6D Intruder 1971
- Grumman A-6E Intruder 3 May 1972

== Major overseas deployments ==
Departure	Return	Air Wing	Carrier	Aircraft	Area of Operation
29 October 1947	11 March 1948	CVBG-1	CVB 41	AD-1	Med
3 May 1949	25 September 1949	CVG-2	CVB 43	AD-1	Med
10 January 1951	18 May 1951	CVG-6	CVB 42	AD-4	Med
9 January 1952	5 May 1952	CVG-6	CVB 41	AD-4	Med
26 August 1952	8 October 1952	CVG-6	CVB 41	AD-4	NorLant
1 December 1952	19 May 1953	CVG-6	CVA 41	AD-4	Med
4 January 1954	4 August 1954	CVG-6	CVA 41	AD-6	Med
9 October 1955	30 April 1956	CVG-6	CVA 39	AD-6	Med
3 September 1957	21 October 1957	CVG-6	CVA 11	AD-6	NorLant
12 February 1959	30 August 1959	CVG-6	CVA 11	AD-6	Med
4 August 1960	17 February 1961	CVG-6	CVA 11	AD-6	Med
3 August 1961	1 March 1962	CVG-6	CVA 11	AD-6	Med
3 August 1962	11 October 1962	CVG-6	CVAN 65	A-1H	Med
19 October 1962	6 December 1962	CVG-6	CVAN 65	A-1H	Carib
6 February 1963	4 September 1963	CVG-6	CVAN 65	A-1H	Med
8 February 1964	3 October 1964	CVW-6	CVAN 65	A-1H	Med/World Cruise
12 May 1966	3 December 1966	CVW-15	CVA 64	A-6A	WestPac/Vietnam
6 June 1967	15 September 1967	CVW-17	CVA 59	A-6A	WestPac/Vietnam
30 December 1968	4 September 1969	CVW-11	CVA 63	A-6A/B	WestPac/Vietnam
23 June 1970	31 January 1971	CVW-7	CVA 62	A-6A	Med
16 September 1971	16 March 1972	CVW-7	CVA 62	A-6A/KA-6D	NorLant/Med
21 June 1973	19 January 1974	CVW-7	CV 62	A-6E/KA-6D	Med
19 July 1974	21 January 1975	CVW-7	CV 62	A-6E/KA-6D	Med
15 October 1975	5 May 1976	CVW-7	CV 62	A-6E/KA-6D	NorLant/Med
31 March 1977	21 October 1977	CVW-7	CV 62	A-6E/KA-6D	Med
16 January 1979	13 July 1979	CVW-7	CVN 69	A-6E/KA-6D	Med
15 April 1980	22 December 1980	CVW-7	CVN 69	A-6E/KA-6D	IO
20 August 1981	7 October 1981	CVW-7	CVN 69	A-6E/KA-6D	NorLant
5 January 1982	13 July 1982	CVW-7	CVN 69	A-6E/KA-6D	Med
27 April 1983	2 December 1983	CVW-7	CVN 69	A-6E/KA-6D	Med
8 May 1984	20 June 1984	CVW-7	CVN 69	A-6E/KA-6D	Carib/NorLant
10 October 1984	8 May 1985	CVW-7	CVN 69	A-6E/KA-6D	Med
8 July 1985	22 August 1985	CVW-7	CVN 69	A-6E/KA-6D	Carib
29 September 1987	28 March 1988	CVW-13	CV 43	A-6E	Med
31 May 1989	30 September 1989	CVW-13	CV 43	A-6E	Med
28 December 1990	28 June 1991	CVW-8	CVN 71	A-6E	Med/Red Sea/Persian Gulf

== Air Wing Assignments ==
Air Wing Tail Code	Assignment Date
CVG-74	1 May 1945
CVBG-1* M	15 November 1946
CVG-2† M	1 September 1948
CVG-6 C	August 1950
CVG-6 AF‡CVG-6/CVW-6§ AE§ RCVW-4 AD	1 January 1965
COMFAIRNORFOLK	5 June 1965
CVW-15 NL	20 February 1966
COMFAIRNORFOLK	3 December 1966
CVW-17 AA	22 December 1966
COMFAIRNORFOLK	15 September 1967
CVW-11 NH	1968
COMFAIRNORFOLK	September 1969
CVW-7 AG	February 1970
CVW-13 AK	1 September 1986
CVW-8 AJ	30 October 1989

* CVG-74 was redesignated CVBG-1 on 15 November 1946.
† CVBG-1 was redesignated CVG-2 on 1 September 1948.
‡ CVG-6’s tail code was changed from C to AF in the latter part of 1957. The effective date was most likely the beginning of FY 58 (1 July 1957).
§ CVG-6’s tailcode was changed from AF to AE sometime in the latter part of 1962. Carrier Air Groups (CVG) were redesignated Carrier Air Wings (CVW) on 20 December 1963, hence, CVG-6 became CVW-6.

== Unit Awards ==
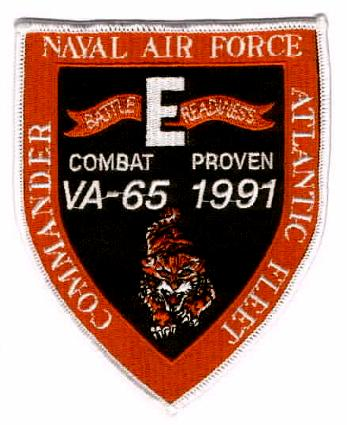
Final VA-65 Battle E patch from Desert Storm

Unit Award
Inclusive Dates Covering Unit Award
Navy Battle E Ribbon
1948	
1 July 1951	30 June 1952
1 July 1959	30 June 1960
1967	
1 October 1977	30 September 1978
1 October 1979	30 September 1980
1 January 1984	31 December 1984
1 January 1991	31 December 1991
Armed Forces Expeditionary Medal
24 October 1962	21 November 1962
15 May 1969	
25 May 1969	27 May 1969
5 June 1969	
7 June 1969	15 June 1969
25 June 1969	
6 June 1983	14 June 1983
27 July 1983	30 August 1983
1 September 1983	19 October 1983
27 October 1983	20 November 1983
Meritorious Unit Commendation
9 September 1970	5 October 1970
30 March 1988	30 September 1989
Navy Expeditionary Medal
29 April 1980	16 July 1980
22 July 1980	8 December 1980
25 May 1983	27 May 1983
Navy Unit Commendation
12 May 1966	3 December 1966
15 January 1969	27 August 1969
29 April 1980	10 December 1980
21 July 1983	20 November 1983
27 October 1984	24 April 1985
17 January 1991	7 February 1991
Vietnam Service Medal
14 June 1966	13 July 1966
27 July 1966	31 August 1966
8 September 1966	1 October 1966
19 October 1966	9 November 1966
23 July 1967	30 July 1967
12 August 1967	
27 January 1969	1 March 1969
12 March 1969	5 April 1969
17 April 1969	10 May 1969
28 June 1969	15 July 1969
27 July 1969	16 August 1969
Kuwait Liberation Medal
7 January 1991	28 February 1991
Southwest Asia Service Medal (includes Desert Storm)
14 January 1991	20 April 1991
Joint Meritorious Unit Commendation
5 April 1991	16 July 1991

* The award covers the competitive year 1948.
† The award covers the competitive year 1967.

== See also ==
- History of the United States Navy
- List of Grumman A-6 Intruder operators
- List of inactive United States Navy aircraft squadrons
- List of United States Navy aircraft squadrons
