= VAH-123 =

Heavy Attack Squadron 123
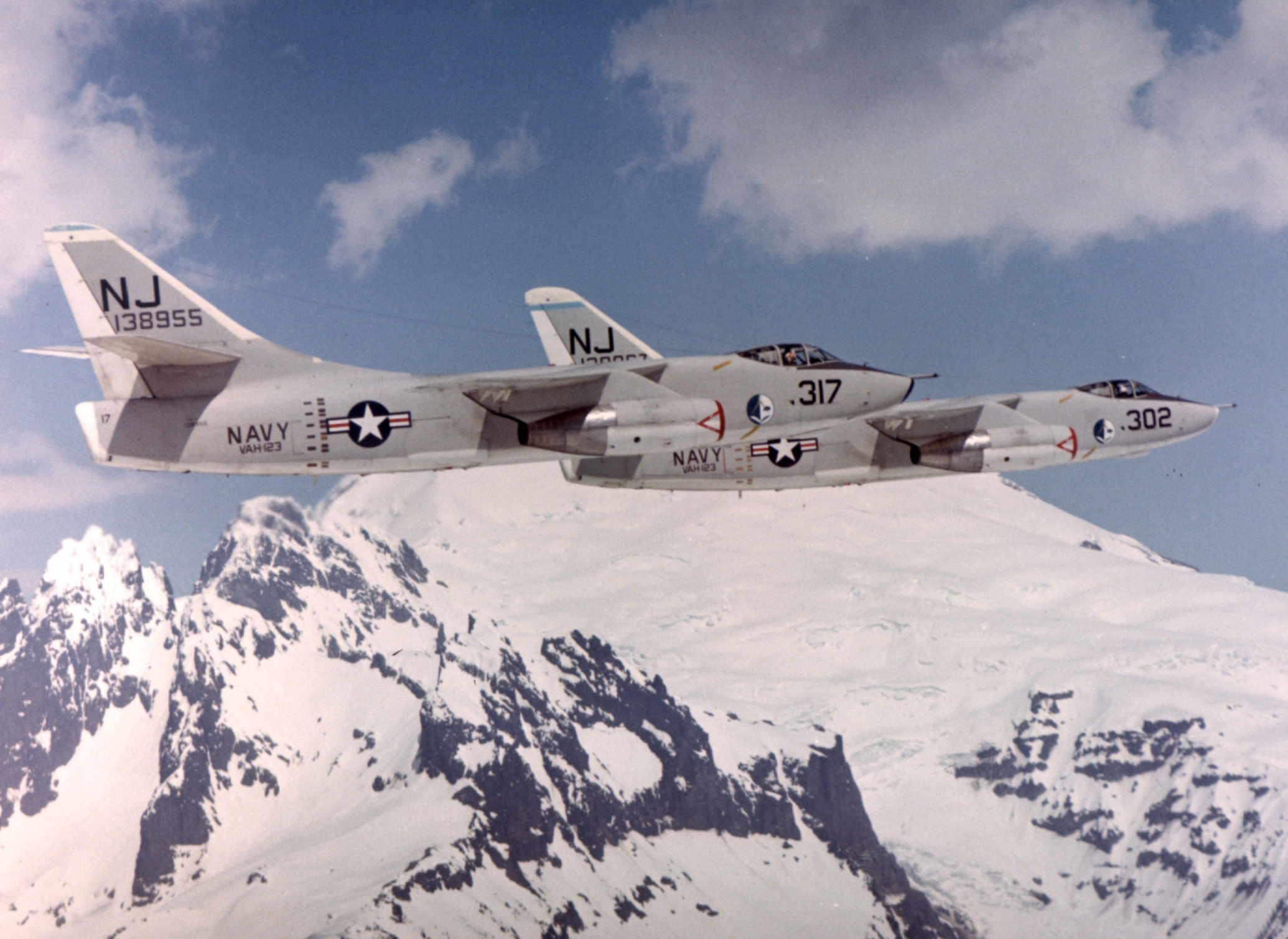
- Two VAH-123 A-3Bs in the 1960s
- Active: 15 June 1957 – 1 February 1971
- Country: United States
- Branch: United States Navy
- Role: Attack
- Part of: Inactive
- Nickname(s): Professionals

Aircraft flown
- Attack: P-2 Neptune; F-3D Skynight; F-9 Cougar; A-3 Skywarrior

VAH-123, nicknamed the Professionals from 1961 onward, was a Heavy Attack Squadron of the United States Navy, based at NAS Whidbey Island, Washington. It was established on 15 June 1957 as Heavy Attack Training Unit, Pacific (HATUPAC). On 29 June 1959 it was redesignated as VAH-123. The squadron was disestablished on 1 February 1971, after eleven years of service.

== Operational history ==
During its time, the squadron flew many different aircraft types, beginning in the years shown: Lockheed P-2 Neptune (1957); Douglas F3D Skyknight (1957); Grumman F-9 Cougar (1958); Douglas A-3 Skywarrior (1958, with several variants over the years); and Grumman A-6 Intruder (1966).

The unit was established to train personnel for the heavy attack mission, including the pilots, bombardier/navigators and aircrewmen. It retained that mission throughout its life. In 1959, it incorporated maintenance training into its mission, thereby providing a complete training program for all aspects of the heavy attack community's operational requirements.

In 1967, VAH-123 was relieved of its mission of replacement training in the A-6 Intruder when VA-128 was established as a separate squadron and assumed that job. When VAH-123 was disestablished, the mission of replacement training for the A-3/KA-3B was transferred to VAQ-130.

== See also ==
- History of the United States Navy
- List of inactive United States Navy aircraft squadrons
