= VA-128 (U.S. Navy) =

Attack Squadron 128
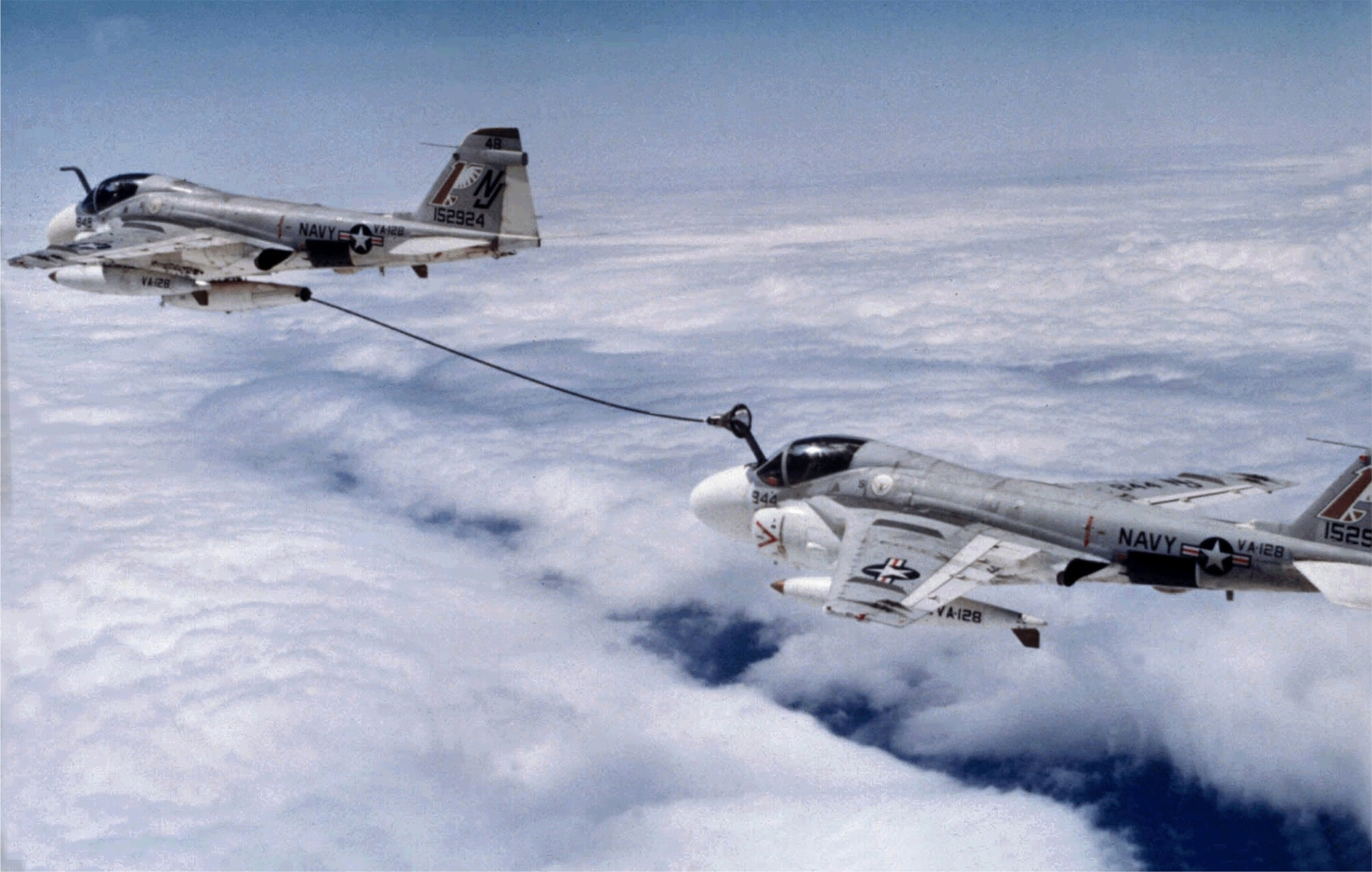
- VA-128 A6A refueling another A-6A, 1970s
- Active: 1 September 1967 - September 1995
- Country: United States
- Branch: United States Navy
- Type: Attack
- Nickname(s): Golden Intruders

Aircraft flown
- Attack: A-6 Intruder; TC-4C Academe

VA-128 was an Attack Squadron of the U.S. Navy, nicknamed the Golden Intruders. It was established on 1 September 1967, and disestablished in September 1995.

== Operational history ==
- September 1967: The squadron was assigned the mission of training combat ready flight crews and replacement maintenance personnel for the A-6 Intruder.
- October 1968: Two U.S. Air Force exchange officers reported aboard for training in the A-6A.
- June 1973: A Naval Officer from the Federal Republic of Germany reported aboard for training in the A-6.
- March–May 1980: The squadron’s TC-4C, Target Recognition Attack Multisensor (TRAM) equipped aircraft, was used to monitor the hot spots on Mount St. Helens in Washington state prior to a major eruption on 18 May. The squadron’s work with U.S. Geological Survey authorities provided the forewarning necessary to save hundreds of lives since the mountain was a popular place for campers, boaters and mountain climbers.
- October 1986: The squadron assumed the additional duty of training all U.S. Marine Corps personnel on the A-6 following the disestablishment of VMAT(AW)-202.
- 1990: The squadron received the first composite wing A-6E on the West Coast.

== Home port assignments ==
The squadron was assigned to these home ports, effective on the dates shown:

- NAS Whidbey Island – 01 Sep 1967

== Aircraft assignment ==
The squadron first received the following aircraft on the dates shown:

- A-6A Intruder – 01 Sep 1967
- TC-4C Academe – 15 Mar 1968
- A-6E Intruder – 16 Dec 1973

== See also ==
- List of squadrons in the Dictionary of American Naval Aviation Squadrons
- Attack aircraft
- List of inactive United States Navy aircraft squadrons
- History of the United States Navy
