= VA-196 (U.S. Navy) =

Attack Squadron 196
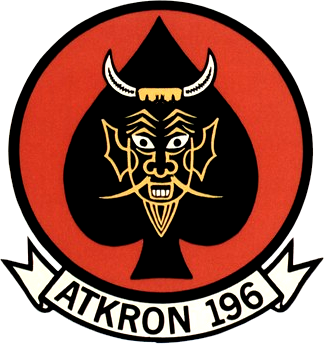
- Active: 15 July 1948 - 21 March 1997
- Country: United States
- Branch: United States Navy
- Nickname(s): Main Battery
- Engagements: Korean War; Vietnam War; Operation Eagle Claw; Operation Earnest Will; Operation Desert Shield

Attack Squadron 196 (VA-196) was an aviation unit of the United States Navy. It was established as Fighter Squadron 153 (VF-153) on 15 July 1948, redesignated as VF-194 on 15 February 1950, and finally redesignated VA-196 on 4 May 1955. Its nicknames were the Thundercats from 1948 to the 1950s, and The Main Battery from the 1950s thereafter. Beginning in 1979 the squadron used the nickname Milestones interchangeably with Main Battery. The squadron was disestablished on 21 March 1997, after more than 48 years of service.

== Operational history ==
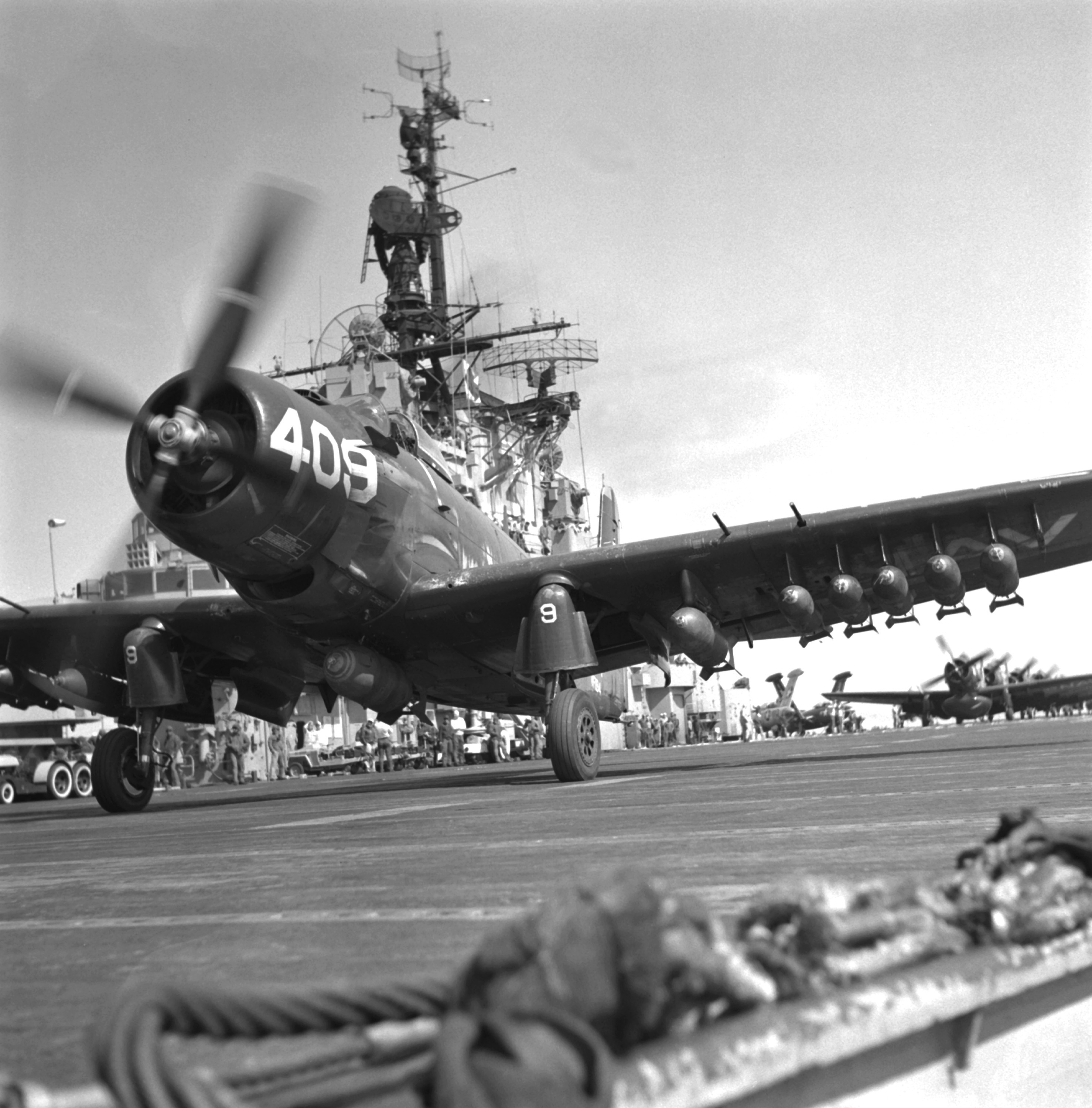
An AD-4NA of VF-194 takes off from USS Boxer for a mission over Korea, 1953.

- 11 December 1951: The squadron flew its first combat sorties, flying interdiction missions in Korea against enemy lines of communications, transportation, industrial and supply facilities.
- 22 March 1952: During a bombing run on a rail line north of Kowon, Korea, Ensign K. A. Schechter was wounded when an enemy shell struck the canopy of his AD Skyraider and exploded. He was blinded by the blood from the wound causing him to maneuver erratically. Lieutenant (jg) J. H. Thayer, heard Ensign Schechter's call for assistance and observing his erratic maneuvering, flew alongside and began giving radio instructions to the blinded pilot. Using Lieutenant Thayer's radio guidance, Ensign Schechter flew his plane to an emergency air strip and successfully landed the aircraft.
- February 1955: In January 1955, the People's Republic of China began bombardment of the Tachen Islands held by Nationalist China. In February squadron aircraft provided air cover during the evacuation of Chinese Nationalist military and civilian personnel from the islands.

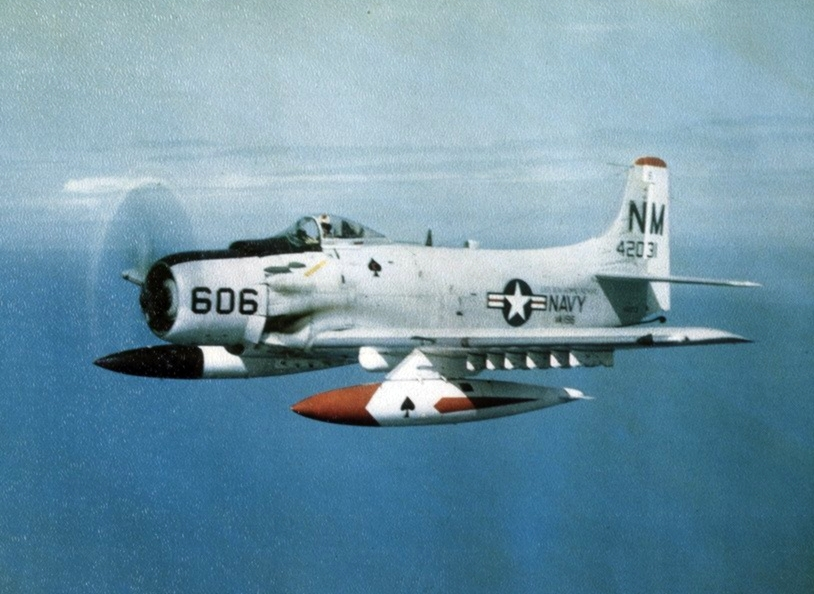
An A-1J Skyraider of VA-196 in 1964.

- August–October 1964: The squadron was involved in operations off the coast of Vietnam following the Tonkin Gulf Incident.
- 14-15 November 1965: The squadron provided Close Air Support (CAS) to elements of the 7th Cavalry Regiment/1st Cavalry Division in the Ia Drang Valley during the Battle at Landing Zone (LZ) XRAY. Due to inclement weather in the area, it was the only squadron flying from the USS Bon Homme Richard (CVA-31) that was capable of providing CAS.
- 21 August 1967: The squadron's commanding officer, Commander L. T. Profilet and his NFO Lieutenant Commander W. M. Hardman, were shot down and taken prisoner during a mission over North Vietnam. They were released by North Vietnam and returned to the U.S. on 29 March 1973.
- 30 October 1967: Lieutenant Commander Charles B Hunter and his Bombardier/Navigator (BN), LT Lyle F. Bull, conducted a single plane (A-6A INTRUDER) raid into Haiphong Harbor on a moonless night. Successfully striking their target they returned to USS Constellation (CV-64). LCDR Hunter and LT Bull were awarded the Navy Cross for their exemplary conduct of a combat mission. This mission was the basis for the movie "Flight of the Intruder"
- December 1971: Following the outbreak of war between India and Pakistan over East Pakistan (Bangladesh), USS Enterprise (CVN-65) was ordered to leave Yankee Station for operations in the Indian Ocean. The carrier, with VA-196 embarked, operated in the Bay of Bengal until the early part of January 1972 and cessation of hostilities.
- October 1972: The squadron participated in Operation Linebacker, heavy air strikes against targets in North Vietnam to interdict the flow of supplies into South Vietnam.
- December 1972: Squadron aircraft participated in Operation Linebacker II, an intensified version of Linebacker.
- February–May 1973: Squadron aircraft flew air support for Operation End Sweep, the clearing of mines from North Vietnamese waters.

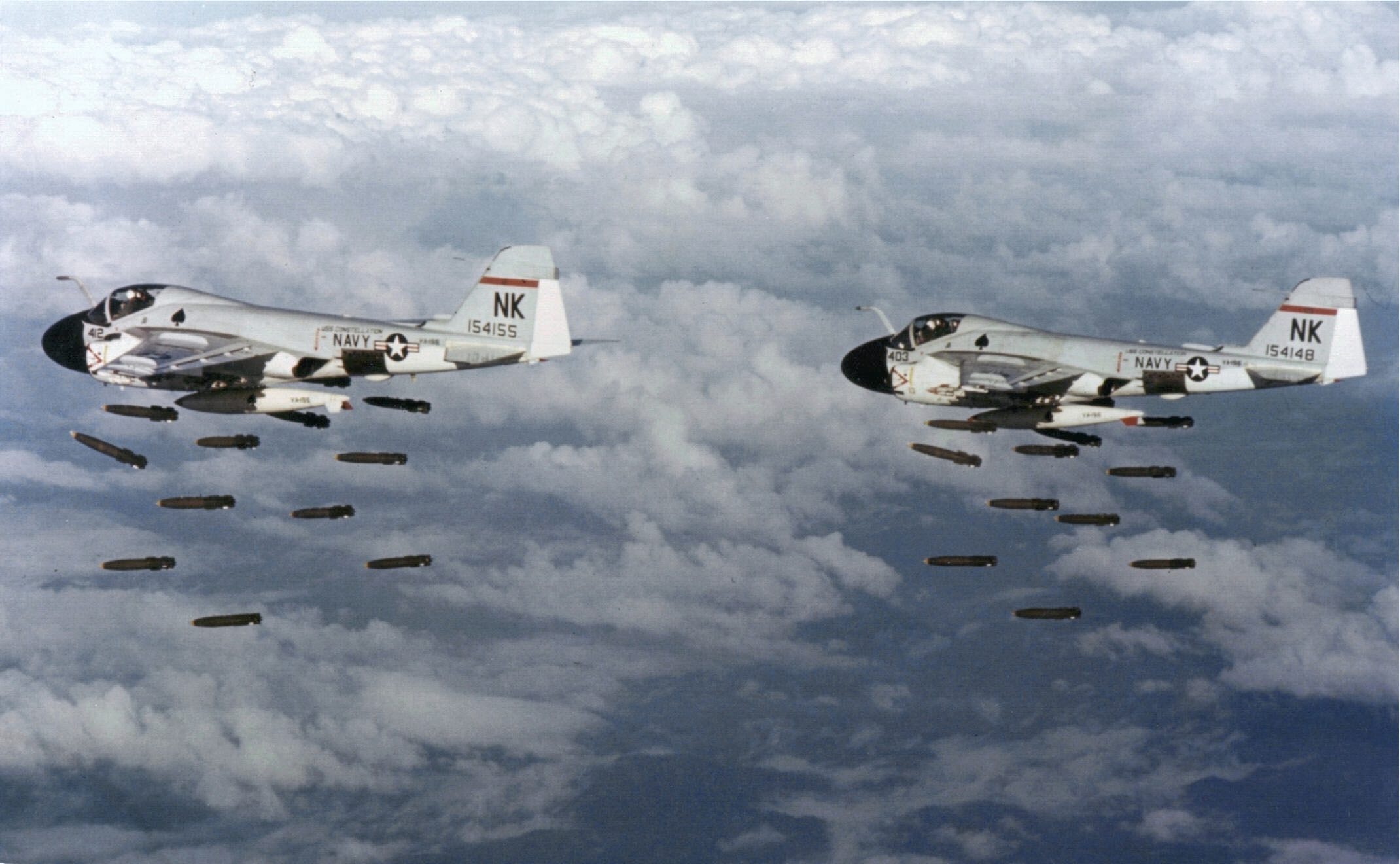
A-6A Intruders from VA-196 dropping Mark 82 bombs over Vietnam, 1968–1969.

- April 1975: The squadron, along with other CVW-14 units, provided air cover support for Operation Frequent Wind, the evacuation of personnel from Saigon as it fell to the communists.
- February 1977: During the crisis in Uganda and threats against Americans in that country, Enterprise, with VA- 196 embarked, operated off the coast of Kenya ready to evacuate Americans from Uganda.
- December 1979: USS Coral Sea, with VA-196 embarked, operated off the coast of South Korea following the assassination of South Korea's President Park Chung-Hee in late October.
- April 1980: Coral Sea, with the squadron embarked, was part of the task force involved in supporting the Iranian hostage rescue attempt.
- May 1980: Following civil unrest in South Korea, the squadron, embarked on Coral Sea, operated off the coast of that country.
- August 1983: Due to the unsettled conditions in Central America, Coral Sea, with VA-196 embarked, operated off the coast of Nicaragua and also participated in surveillance for illegal drug traffic.
- July 1987: Due to the increased attacks on merchant and tanker shipping in the Persian Gulf during the Iran/Iraqi War, the United States began to escort reflagged Kuwaiti oil tankers. During Operation Earnest Will, VA-196 provided air support for the first convoy of reflagged tankers passing through the Strait of Hormuz.
- August 1990: Due to the invasion of Kuwait by Iraq, USS Independence, with VA-196 embarked, was ordered to the North Arabian Sea.
- August – 2 October 1990: VA-196 flew sorties from Independence in support of Operation Desert Shield, the buildup of American and Allied forces to counter a threatened invasion of Saudi Arabia by Iraq.
- 2 October – 2 November 1990: On 2 October, Independence entered the Persian Gulf and operated in those waters for two days before returning to the Northern Arabian Sea. VA-196 continued flying sorties for operation Desert Shield until Independence was relieved on 2 November and departed for its return trip to the United States.

== Home port assignments ==
The squadron was assigned to these home ports, effective on the dates shown:

- NAS Alameda, California – 15 Jul 1948
- NAS Moffett Field, California – 23 Feb 1959
- NAS Lemoore, California – Feb 1963
- NAS Oceana, Virginia – 1 May 1966
- NAS Whidbey Island, Washington – 15 Nov 1966

== Aircraft assignment ==
The squadron first received the following aircraft on the dates shown:

- F8F-1 Bearcat – Jul 1948
- F8F-2 Bearcat – 11 May 1949
- F4U-4 Corsair – Aug 1950
- AD-3 Skyraider – Dec 1950
- AD-1 Skyraider – Jan 1951
- AD-2 Skyraider – Sep 1951
- AD-4NA Skyraider – Aug 1952
- AD-4Q Skyraider – Aug 1952
- AD-6/AD-1H Skyraider – Dec 1953
- AD-7/A1-J Skyraider – Mar 1962
- A-6A Intruder – 01 Oct 1966
- A-6B Intruder – Jun 1968
- KA-6D Intruder – Mar 1971
- A-6E Intruder – 02 Jul 1975

== See also ==
- List of squadrons in the Dictionary of American Naval Aviation Squadrons
- Attack aircraft
- List of inactive United States Navy aircraft squadrons
- History of the United States Navy
