= Tailhook Association =

Nonprofit organization of naval aviators

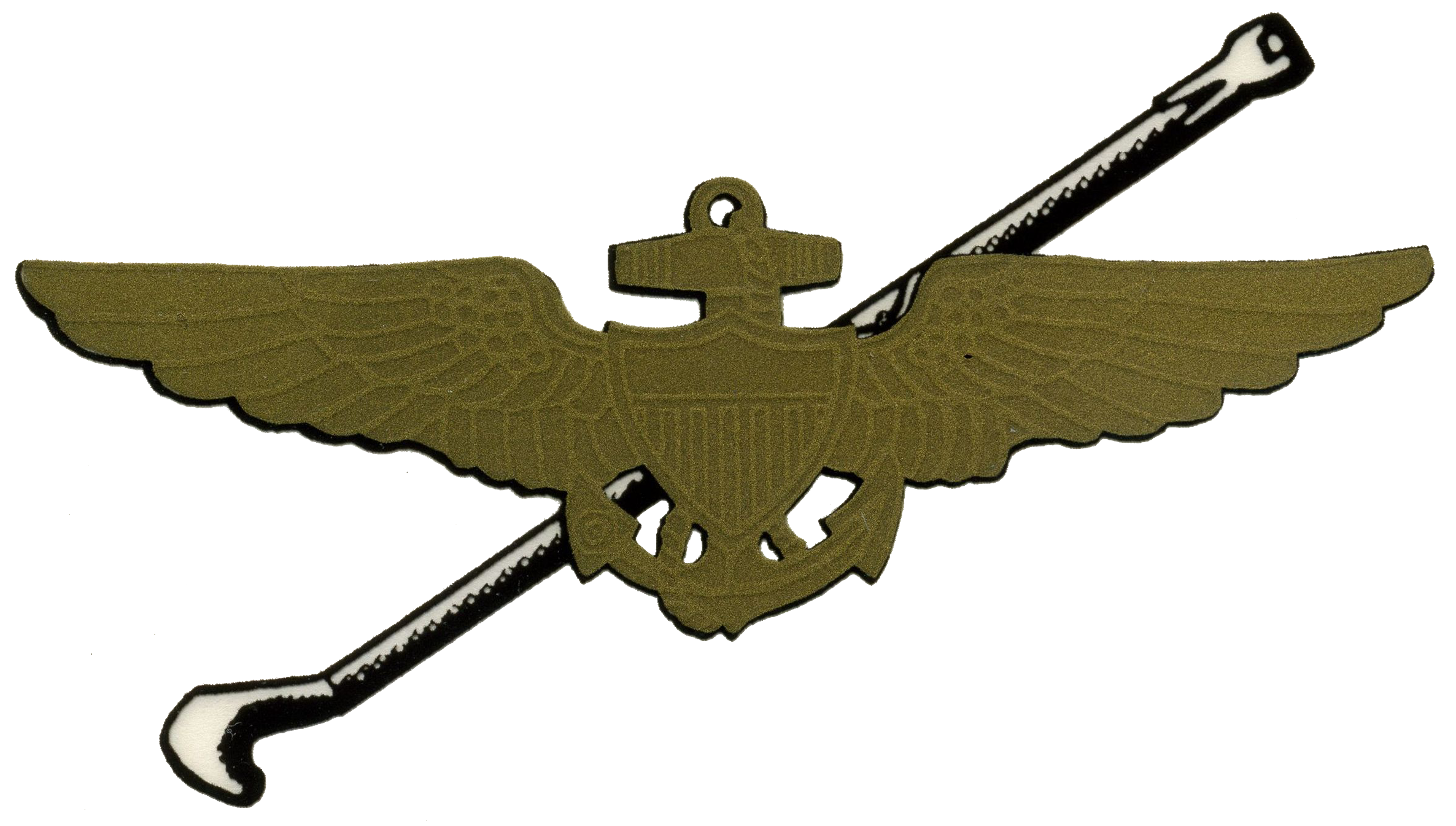
- Founded: 1956
- Location: Scripps Ranch, San Diego, California
- Chairman of the Board: RADM Mike "Nasty" Manazir, USN (Ret.)
- President: CAPT Kristen "Dragon" Findlay, USN
- Website: https://www.tailhook.net/

The Tailhook Association is a U.S.-based non-profit organization supporting the interests of sea-based aviation, with emphasis on aircraft carriers. The word tailhook refers to the hook underneath the tail of the aircraft that catches the arresting wire suspended across the flight deck in order to stop the landing plane quickly.

== History ==
=== Establishment ===
The Tailhook Association was formed by active-duty naval aviators in 1956, eventually growing into a national organization headquartered in San Diego, California. During the Vietnam War, the annual Tailhook reunion and symposium also served to provide opportunities for aircrews from the Pacific and Atlantic Fleets to exchange information about events in Southeast Asia. The association evolved into an independent, non-profit organization dedicated to building camaraderie among those that have been a part of the Naval Aviation team. The purpose of the association is to foster, encourage, develop, study and support the aircraft carrier and sea-based aircraft and aircrews.

The Tailhook Educational Foundation (TEF) was created in 1992 to educate the nation's public with regard to the history and present day activities of the US Navy carrier aviation community. TEF is a separate non-profit that works closely with, and in support of, the Tailhook Association, providing over 100 scholarships per year to Naval Aviation legacies. In 2024, the TEF reported revenues of $2,121,462 and total assets of $6,241,674.

=== The Tailhook scandal ===
In September 1991, the 35th annual symposium in Las Vegas featured a two-day debriefing on Navy and Marine Corps aviation in Operation Desert Storm. It was the largest such meeting yet held, with 4,000 attendees including active, reserve, and retired personnel. According to a Department of Defense (DoD) report, 83 women and 7 men stated that they had been victims of sexual assault and harassment during the meeting. Several participants later stated that a number of flag officers attending the meetings were aware of the sexual assaults, but did nothing to stop them.

The issues were never settled, and as late as 2002, the Tailhook chairman spoke dismissively of "the alleged misconduct that occurred in 1991".

Frontline on PBS reported:

Ultimately the careers of fourteen admirals and almost 300 naval aviators were scuttled or damaged by Tailhook. For example, Secretary of the Navy H. Lawrence Garrett III and CNO Admiral Frank Kelso were both at Tailhook '91. Garrett ultimately resigned and Kelso retired early two years after the convention.

Author Jean Zimmerman developed the thesis that the scandal underscored the shifting status of women in the US military and particularly the role of women in combat.

== Activities ==
Among the Tailhook programs are publication of the quarterly journal The Hook, addressing historical and current events coverage; college scholarships via the Tailhook Educational Foundation; and local/regional "ready rooms" for active and retired members who support fleet activities.

Some visitors to US Navy aircraft carriers who joined or left the ship on a Carrier Onboard Delivery aircraft are issued "Tailhook certificates" by the Navy, commending them for "NAFOD and intestinal fortitude."

== Awards ==
=== James D. "Jig Dog" Ramage Award ===
Year	Aircraft Carrier	Carrier Air Wing
2001	USS George Washington (CVN-73)	CVW-17
2002	USS Carl Vinson (CVN-70)	CVW-11
2003	USS Abraham Lincoln (CVN-72)	CVW-14
2004	USS Harry S. Truman (CVN-75)	CVW-3
2005	USS Harry S. Truman (CVN-75)	CVW-3
2006	USS Theodore Roosevelt (CVN-71)	CVW-8

=== Tailhooker Of The Year Award ===
Yearly award given to an individual who has made the most significant contribution to U.S. carrier aviation.

Year	Rank	Recipient	Service
1963	CAPT	Richard "Doc" Phillips, MC	USN
1964	CAPT	Robert M. Elder	USN
1965	VADM	Paul D. Stroop	USN
1966	VADM	Paul H. Ramsey	USN
1967	ADM	Roy L. Johnson	USN
1968	ADM	Thomas H. Moorer	USN
1969	VADM	Thomas F. Connolly	USN
1970	ADM	John Hyland	USN
1971	VADM	Maurice F. Weisner	USN
1972	VADM	William D. Houser	USN
1973	VADM	Damon W. "Hutch" Cooper	USN
1974	VADM	Frederick H. Michaelis	USN
1975	VADM	Robert B. Baldwin	USN
1976	VADM	James B. Stockdale	USN
1977	VADM	Robert P. Coogan	USN
1978	ADM	Thomas B. Hayward	USN
1979	VADM	Frederick C. Turner	USN
1980	VADM	G.E.R. "Gus" Kinnear	USN
1981	RADM	Robert E. Kirksey	USN
1982	ADM	Wesley L. McDonald	USN
1983	VADM	Robert F. Schoultz	USN
1984	RADM	Jerry O. Tuttle	USN
1985	RADM	Paul T. Gillcrist	USN
1986	VADM	Edward H. Martin	USN
1987	CAPT	Byron L. Duff	USN
1988	CAPT	L. Robert Canepa	USN
1989	CAPT	Archie Manning	USN
1990	RADM	Ed Allen	USN
1991	CAPT	Jay Campbell	USN
1992	No Award		
1993	RADM	Lyle F. Bull	USN (Ret)
1994	CAPT	Fields Richardson	USN (Ret)
1995	RADM	Frederick L. Lewis	USN (Ret)
1996	CDR	Robert E. Stumpf	USN (Ret)
1997	ADM	Leighton W. Smith	USN (Ret)
1998	CAPT	Ken "Kilo" Parks	USN
1999	CAPT	Evan "Streak" Chanik	USN
2000	VADM	Michael L. Bowman	USN
2001	CAPT	George B. Dom	USN
	LtCol	James L. Stalnaker	USMC
2002	CDR	Sterling Gilliam, Jr.	USN
	LtCol	Raymond Damm	USMC
2003	CAPT	"Shortney" Gortney	USN
	LtCol	Gary Lee "Lurch" Thomas	USMC
2004	CAPT	"Cyrus" Vance	USN
	LtCol	Wade E. "WZL" Weigel	USMC
2005	CAPT	Don Quinn	USN
	Maj	Peter L "Mud Duck" McArdle	USMC
2006	CAPT	Kevin "Kid" Donnegan	USN
	LtCol	John "Dog" Jansen	USMC
2007	CAPT	"Nasty" Manazir	USN
	LtCol	Hunter "Hamster" Hobson	USMC
2008	CAPT	Bill Sizemore	USN
2009	CAPT	Thomas Haley	USN
2010	CAPT	Dan "Undra" Cheever	USN
2011	CAPT	Mark Darrah	USN
2012	CAPT	David Silkey	USN
2013	CAPT	Sam Paparo	USN
2014	CAPT	Gregory Fenton	USN
2015	CAPT	Greg "HiFi" Harris	USN
2016	CAPT	Scott "Topper" Farr	USN
2017	CAPT	Richard "Snap" Brophy	USN
2018	CDR	Mike "Jockey" Lisa	USN
2019	CAPT	"Blades" Dienna	USN
2020	CAPT	John "Yank" Cummings	

=== Lifetime Achievement Award ===
Year	Rank	Recipient	Service
1993	RADM	James D. "Jig Dog" Ramage	USN (Ret)
	Mr.	Ron Thomas	
1994	CAPT	Larry Flint	USN (Ret),
	CAPT	W.D. "Bill" Knutson	USN (Ret)
1995	VADM	William D. Houser	USN (Ret)
	CAPT	Robert M. Elder	USN (Ret)
1996	CAPT	Richard "Chick" Harmer	USN (Ret)
	RADM	Paul T. Gillcrist	USN (Ret)
	CAPT	Lou Kriser	USN (Ret)
1997	CAPT	Wynn Foster	USN (Ret)
	CAPT	C.A.L. "Cal" Swanson	USN (Ret)
1998	CDR	Jack D. Woodul	USNR (Ret)
	Mr.	Barrett Tillman	
1999	RADM	Thomas F. Brown III	USN (Ret)
	CAPT	Walter M. Schirra	USN (Ret)
2000	CAPT	Lonny K. McClung	USN (Ret)
	CAPT	Richard L. "Zeke" Cormier	USN (Ret)
	CDR	George "Buddy" Gilman	USNR (Ret)
2001	CAPT	Richard G. Hanecak	USN (Ret)
2002	RADM	Glen W. "Corky" Lennox	USN (Ret)
	CDR	Dean S. "Diz" Laird	USN (Ret)
2003	RADM	Frederick "Bad Fred" Lewis	USN (Ret)
2004	CAPT	Jack Davis	USN (Ret)
2005	CAPT	Jerry Palmer	USN (Ret)
2006	CAPT	Steve Millikin	USN (Ret)
	CDR	Jan Jacobs	USNR (Ret)
2007	CAPT	Gene Cernan	USN (Ret)
	Mr.	Wes Fry	
2008	RADM	Lloyd Abbot	USN (Ret)
	ADM	Wesley McDonald	USN (Ret)

=== The Hook Magazine Contributor of the Year ===
Year	Rank/Title	Recipient	Service
1987	CAPT	Done East	USN (Ret)
1988	Mr	John Lundstrom	
	Mr	Jim Sawruk	
1989	CAPT	Bill Scarborough	USN (Ret)
1990	Mr	Mike Weeks	
1991	LT	Mark Morgan	USNR
1992	No Award		
1993	CDR	Ernie Mares	USN (Ret)
1994	CDR	Jack Woodul	USNR (Ret)
1995	LCDR	Rick Morgan	USN
1996	CDR	John B. Nichols	USN (Ret)
1997	Mr	Thomas F. Gates	
1998	Mr	Mark Morgan (2)	
	LCDR	Rick Morgan (2)	USN (Ret)
1999	Ms	Margaret Bone	
2000	LCDR	E. Leigh Armistead	USN
2001	Ms	Vivienne Heines	
2002	Mr	Fred Tannenbaum	
2003	CDR	Peter Mersky	USNR (Ret)
2004	PHCS	Bob Lawson	USN (Ret)
2005	Mr	Tony Holmes	
2006	CDR	Robert R. "Boom" Powell	USN (Ret)

=== Honorary Tailhooker of the Year ===
(Sponsored by the Boeing Company)

Year	Rank/Title	Recipient	Service
2001	Ms	Barbara Woodbury	
2002	Mr	John Ascuaga	
2003	Hon	Gordon R. England	SECNAV
2004	Hon	Richard Danzig	SECNAV
2004	Gen	William L. "Spider" Nyland	USMC
2005	Mr	Jon Winthrop	
2006	AVCM	John Porter	USN (Ret)
2007	CDR	Ed "Tick" McCabe	USN (Ret)
