= Yankee Station =

Geographic position used by the US Navy during the Vietnam war

Positions of Yankee Station

Yankee Station (officially Point Yankee) was a fixed coordinate off the coast of Vietnam where U.S. Navy aircraft carriers and support ships operated in open waters over a nine-year period during the Vietnam War. The location was used primarily by aircraft carriers of Task Force 77 to launch strikes over North Vietnam. While the coordinate's official designation was "Point Yankee", it was universally referred to as Yankee Station. Carriers conducting air operations at Yankee Station were said to be "on the line" (in combat) and statistical summaries were based on days on the line. Yankee Station was initially located at 16° 00′ N, 110° 00′ E, however with a massive increase in operations over North Vietnam in 1966 the station was moved about 145 miles (230 km) northwest to 17° 30′ N, 108° 30′ E, placing it about 90 miles (145 km) from the North Vietnamese shore.

== Yankee Team beginnings ==
The name derived from it being the geographic reference point "Y", pronounced "Yankee" in the NATO phonetic alphabet. In turn the term Point Yankee derived from the launch point for "Yankee Team" aerial reconnaissance missions over Laos conducted in 1964. The first ship operations at Point Yankee took place in April 1964. Starting 13 April 1966 Yankee Station was moved further toward the Gulf of Tonkin at 17° 30' N and 108° 30' E, about 190 km due east of Đồng Hới.

Early missions were flown in the Kingdom of Laos during the Laotian Civil War. Begun 19 May 1964 as medium and low level U.S. Navy photo reconnaissance missions over the Plain of Jars, it was soon ramped up to "armed reconnaissance" covered by U.S. Air Force F-100 Super Sabre fighter escorts from Tan Son Nhut. The classified operation was dubbed Yankee Team on 25 May 1964. Notice of their non-emergency sorties was forwarded from CINCPAC to Washington 36 hours in advance for possible cancellation. A command post was set up in 2nd Air Division headquarters. A U.S. Air Force liaison officer was posted to USS Kitty Hawk to coordinate the naval aviators with Air Force operations; in turn, a party of five naval personnel were detailed to the command post.

Committed to a mission in which half the planes drew ground fire, and lacking a formal combat search and rescue backup, the mission suffered its first loss on 6 June 1964 when Lieutenant Charles F. Klusman was shot down while flying at 1,200 feet. Air America attempted rescue without success. Flak suppression protocols had not yet been figured out; use of napalm, the most successful counter to anti-aircraft batteries, was banned by the American ambassador to Laos, Leonard Unger. A second plane went down during the would-be CSAR.

After settling into secretive run air strikes against communist infiltrators into Laos, Yankee Team morphed into Operation Barrel Roll.

== Yankee Station continues the fight ==
During the two periods of sustained air operations against North Vietnam (2 March 1965 to 31 October 1968, and 30 March 1972 to 29 December 1972) there were normally three carriers on the line, each conducting air operations for twelve hours, then off for twelve hours. One of the carriers would operate in Vietnam territorial waters from noon to midnight, another from midnight to noon, and one during daylight hours, which gave 24-hour coverage plus additional effort during daylight hours, when sorties were most effective. However at the end of May, 1972, six carriers were for a short period of time on the line at Yankee Station conducting Linebacker and Linebacker II strikes.

The first aircraft carrier at Yankee Station was Kitty Hawk, which was ordered there in April 1964 for the Yankee Team missions. Kitty Hawk was joined by Ticonderoga in May and Constellation in June, two months prior to the Gulf of Tonkin Resolution. Ticonderoga and Constellation launched the first bombing missions from Yankee Station on 5 August 1964. Constellation was also the last carrier conducting operations at Yankee Station on August 15, 1973. USS Forrestal suffered a major accident while at Yankee Station when a series of fires and explosions on her deck killed 134 men and injured another 161.

A corresponding Dixie Station in the South China Sea off the Mekong Delta was a single carrier point for conducting strikes within South Vietnam from 15 May 1965 to 3 August 1966.

== Recommended reading ==
- Francillon, René. Tonkin Gulf Yacht Club US Carrier Operations off Vietnam, Naval Institute Press (1988) ISBN 0-87021-696-1
- Nichols, John B. (CDR, USN ret.) and Tillman, Barrett. On Yankee Station, Naval Institute Press, ISBN 0-87021-559-0
- Nordeen, Lon. Air Warfare in the Missile Age, Smithsonian Institution Press (1985), ISBN 0-87474-680-9
- Reardon, Carol. Launch the Intruders University of Kansas Press (2005) ISBN 978-0-7006-1677-0
