= Officer Candidate School (United States Navy) =

US Navy officer commissioning program based at Newport, RI

Navy Officer Candidate School
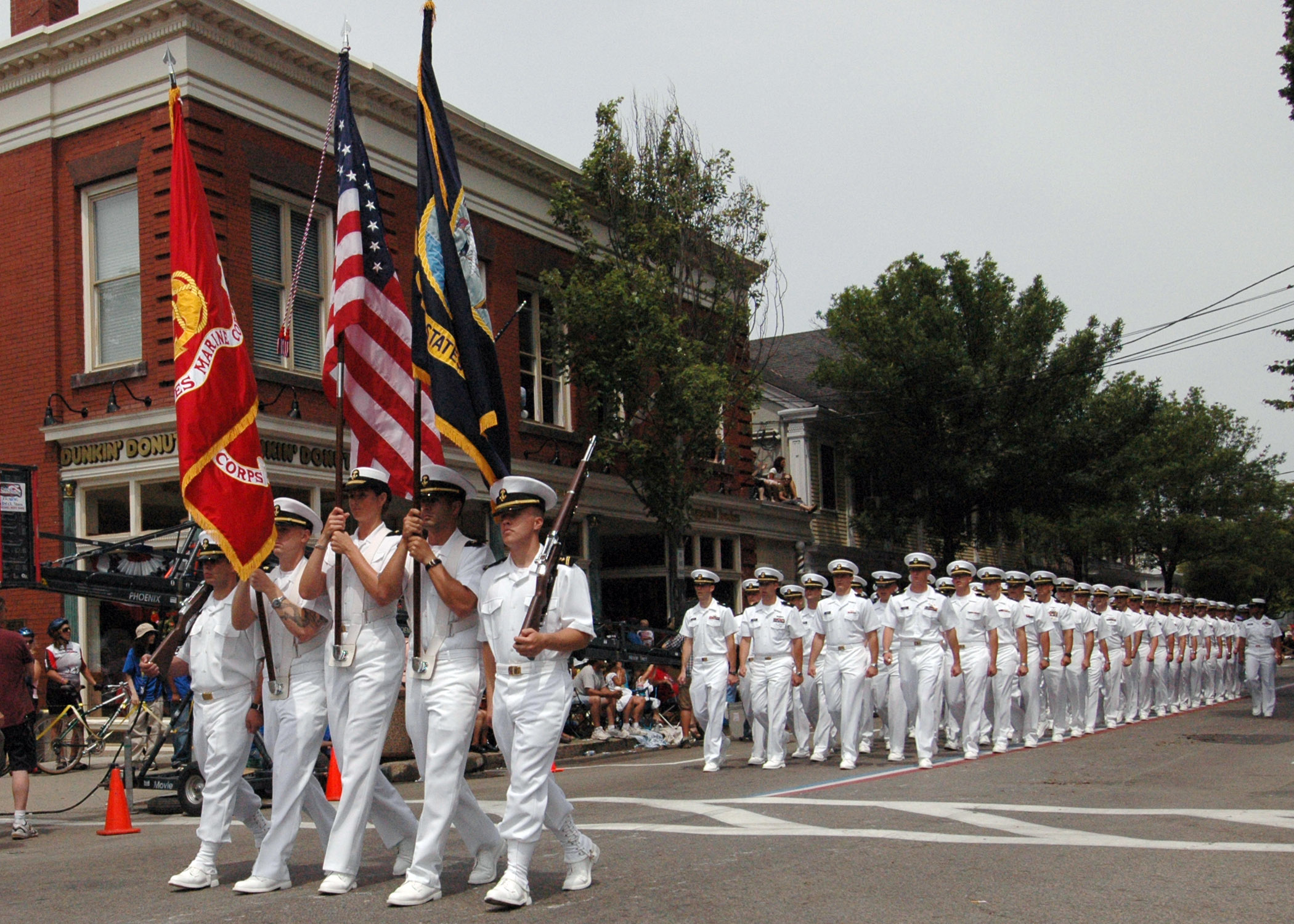
- Officer candidates from Officer Candidate School march in the Bristol Fourth of July Parade
- Country: United States
- Branch: United States Navy
- Role: Train and commission U.S. Navy Officers
- Part of: Officer Training Command Newport
- Garrison/HQ: Naval Station Newport, Rhode Island
- Mascot: Bulldog

Commanders
- Current commander: CDR Adam Walski

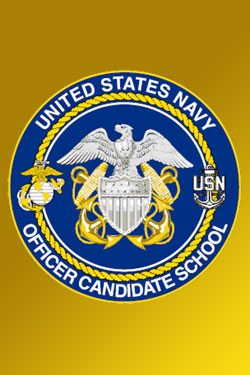
Logo of the Navy Officer Candidate School

The United States Navy's Officer Candidate School (abbreviated OCS) provides initial training for officers of the line and select operational staff corps communities (supply and CEC) in the United States Navy. Along with United States Naval Academy (USNA) and Naval Reserve Officer Training Corps (NROTC), OCS is one of three principal sources of newly commissioned naval officers.

== Selection ==
Qualified U.S. citizens who hold a bachelor's degree meet with an officer recruiter and prepare packages for consideration. Selection is competitive.

Officer candidates are already associated with a designator when they begin their training at OCS. This is in contrast to USNA and NROTC, where trainees are not associated with a community until soon before commissioning.

== Course of training ==
OCS classes are numbered by the federal fiscal year of their graduation (e.g., 09-19 would be the ninth class to graduate in fiscal year 2019).

Officer candidate uniforms are similar to those worn at USNA and NROTC, with several notable differences. Candidates wear plain foul anchors. In the final phase, candidate officers wear the collar device of MIDN ENS through MIDN CAPT, but are never referred to as Midshipmen.

The U.S. Navy Officer Candidate shoulder board is worn by the entire regiment without reference to collar device.

Those in training at OCS are mustered at the pay grade of E-5 unless they are prior enlisted already holding a higher pay grade. While attending OCS the students hold the rank of Officer Candidate Under Instruction Second Class (OCUI2). Officer candidate uniforms are similar to those worn at NROTC programs and USNA, but officer candidates are never referred to as midshipmen.

Classes advance through four distinct phases, gradually taking on greater responsibility and preparing to commission:

Phase 1	Indoctrination Candidate ("Indoc")
Phase 2	Junior Officer Candidate ("JOC")
Phase 3	Senior Officer Candidate ("SOC")
Phase 4	Candidate Officer ("Candio")

In addition to constant physical training and rifle drill, instruction inside and outside the classroom includes:

- Naval history
- Engineering & weapons
- Damage control
- Division Officer Basics
- Leadership
- Seamanship
- Navigation
- Military law

Every action is scrutinized and shortcomings are swiftly corrected. Candidates who do not meet milestones can be held back in training or removed from the program. Adherence to an honor code is mandatory; violators are removed.

Upon successful completion of the 13-week course the candidates are commissioned as active duty Ensigns (O-1) in the United States Navy. The new officers then join their predetermined designator communities and are eligible for orders to the fleet or follow-on training.

== History ==
A video produced by the U.S. Navy about OCS in 2011.

The structure and course of instruction at OCS has changed many times over the years.

Part of the Post-War Holloway Plan, OCS was originally established to meet the demands of Cold War officer procurement. The successful OCS/Midshipman Schools of World War II era curriculum was followed. In addition to Officer Candidate School (OCS) at Naval Station Newport, Rhode Island, the Navy still operated Aviation Officer Candidate School (AOCS) at NAS Pensacola, Florida. AOCS trained prospective naval aviators, naval flight officers, aviation maintenance duty officers, and air intelligence officers, while OCS trained all other naval officer line communities (e.g., surface warfare officers, submarine officers, special warfare (SEAL) officers) as well as select staff corps officers. However a small percentage of OCS graduates also entered naval aviation.

During the 1950s and through the 1990s, OCS lasted for 16 weeks. The first 8 weeks most candidates wore enlisted uniforms. College graduates, recruited directly from civilian life, were placed in special rate of OCSA (E-2), "officer candidate seaman apprentice." They wore the seaman apprentice rate with blocked letter "OC" over rate insignia, while prior service candidates (referred to as "fleet men") wore their enlisted rate with a blocked letter "OC" over their badge. Chief petty officers wore their CPO uniform, complete with distinctive CPO cap device, and a blocked letter "OC" on left shoulder. Warrant officers (W-1) also continued to wear their uniform, complete with shoulder boards/collar insignia and warrant cap device, with blocked letter "OC" on left shoulder. In final 8 weeks all candidates wore the uniform of a midshipman fourth-class with blocked "OC" letter on left shoulder. They were addressed as ''officer candidate" and/or "mister." Beginning with Class 38 (April–August 1958) college graduates and fleet sailors were integrated in each company, with all chief petty officers and warrant officers (W-1) placed in their own company.

=== Aviation Officer Candidate School ===
AOCS contained two parallel track programs, the "traditional" AOCS for college and university graduates that operated on a year-round basis, and the Aviation Reserve Officer Candidate (AVROC) program during the summer and early fall. AVROC, similar in nature to the Marine Corps' Platoon Leaders Class (PLC) program, split the AOCS curriculum in half, with college and university juniors attending the first half during the summer between their junior and senior years, then returning the following summer after college graduation to complete the second half of the program and receive their commissions. During the summer months, AVROC classes would typically enter every other week, with their graduations on alternating weeks from AOCS graduations. For AVROCs, the advantage of their program was that their pay entry base date was adjusted to the day they signed up for the AVROC program, typically two to three years before their commissioning. As a result, when they were finally commissioned, they received a higher base pay rate reflecting two to three years of service (i.e., O-1 over 2 years or O-1 over 3 years) versus their traditional nonprior service AOCS counterparts (i.e., O-1 less than 2 years). AVROCs were otherwise indiscernible from traditional AOCs.

Another subset of the traditional AOCs was the Naval Aviation Cadet (NavCad) Program. NavCads, who had some college, but typically lacked a bachelor's degree, completed the entire AOCS curriculum but were not commissioned upon graduation. Instead, they attended their entire flight school program as noncommissioned candidates and did not receive their commissions as ensigns until they completed flight training and received their wings as Naval Aviators or (prior to 1966) Naval Aviation Observers or (1966 and later) Naval Flight Officers. These former NavCads, commissioned officers without bachelor's degrees, would complete their initial fleet squadron tour and would then be sent to the Naval Postgraduate School or a civilian college or university as lieutenants on their first shore-duty assignment in order to finish their baccalaureate degree. AOCS stopped taking NavCad civilian and enlisted candidates in 1968, and the program was discontinued. The NavCad program was reintroduced in early 1986 owing to increased fleet requirements for naval aviators (naval flight officers were not procured via this later incarnation of NavCad), but the program was eliminated again in October 1993 as a result of the end of the Cold War and resultant manpower reductions in the active duty naval officer ranks.

AOCS was a department of the Naval Aviation Schools Command (NAVAVSCOLSCOM), a tenant command at Naval Air Station Pensacola, and organized as a regiment with three battalions until just following the Vietnam War, when it was reduced in size to two battalions. Each battalion consisted of several AOCS classes graduating every two to three weeks. Like OCS, AOCS also emphasized leadership and physical and military training. However, whereas OCS incorporated academics such as shipboard engineering and shipboard navigation, AOCS incorporated "the Big 3": aerodynamics, aircraft engines, and air navigation, as well as land and aviation water survival training that USNA, NROTC, Marine Corps OCS, and PLC, and USCGA and Coast Guard OCS graduates concurrently attended as part of NAVAVSCOLSCOM's Aviation Preflight Indoctrination (API) program for commissioned officer flight students.

Unlike OCS, AOCS classes were numbered by graduation date in the calendar, rather than fiscal year.

=== Unification and relocation to Newport ===
The first U.S. Navy OCS at Newport, Rhode Island, began operation in 1951 and was closed down in April 1993 when the programs were merged into a single OCS in the former AOCS facilities at NAS Pensacola.

In September 2007, OCS returned to Newport as a result of the 2005 BRAC Commission.

== Marine Corps presence ==
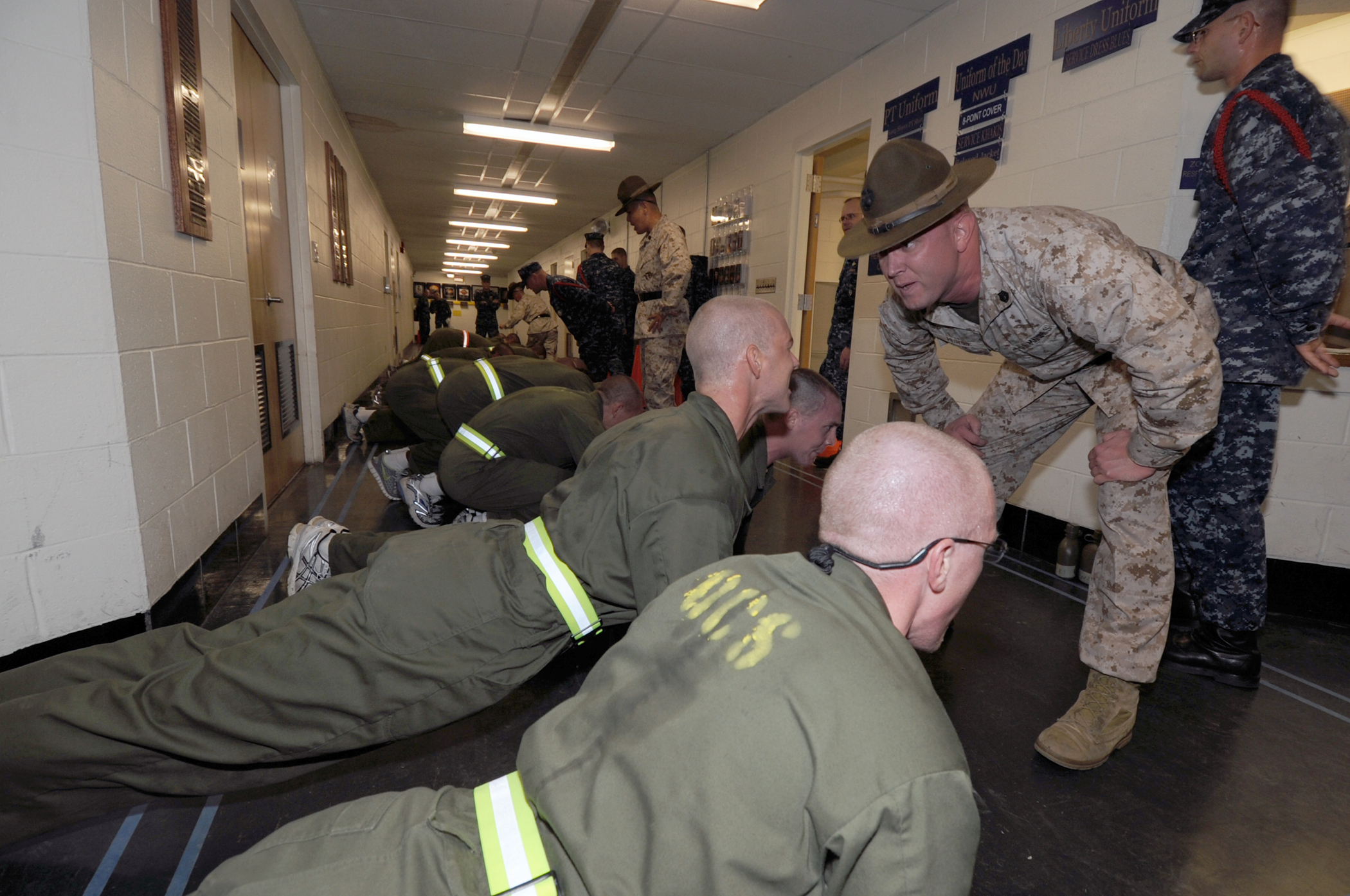
A USMC drill instructor (right, wearing a campaign cover) offers motivation and critiques an Indoctrination Candidate's push up form.

At AOCS, all basic military training was administered by enlisted United States Marine Corps drill instructors, a holdover from World War II when AOCS and NavCad graduates were given an option of a commission as either an ensign in the Navy or a 2nd lieutenant in the Marine Corps. This facet of the training was considered a point of pride by the graduates of AOCS and a mark of distinction they felt separated themselves from the graduates of the original OCS in Newport, as well as NROTC and the Naval Academy. Tradition dictated that when AOCS graduates were commissioned, the first salute they received was from their former Marine Corps drill instructor (returned with a silver dollar handshake).

When AOCS and OCS merged, the unified OCS program retained the Marine Corps tradition alongside Navy Recruit Division Commanders (RDC). This continuing Marine presence is the origin of the slogan "Navy owned, Marine Corps trained" and the distinctive blue "Bulldog" company guidons.

== Notable alumni ==
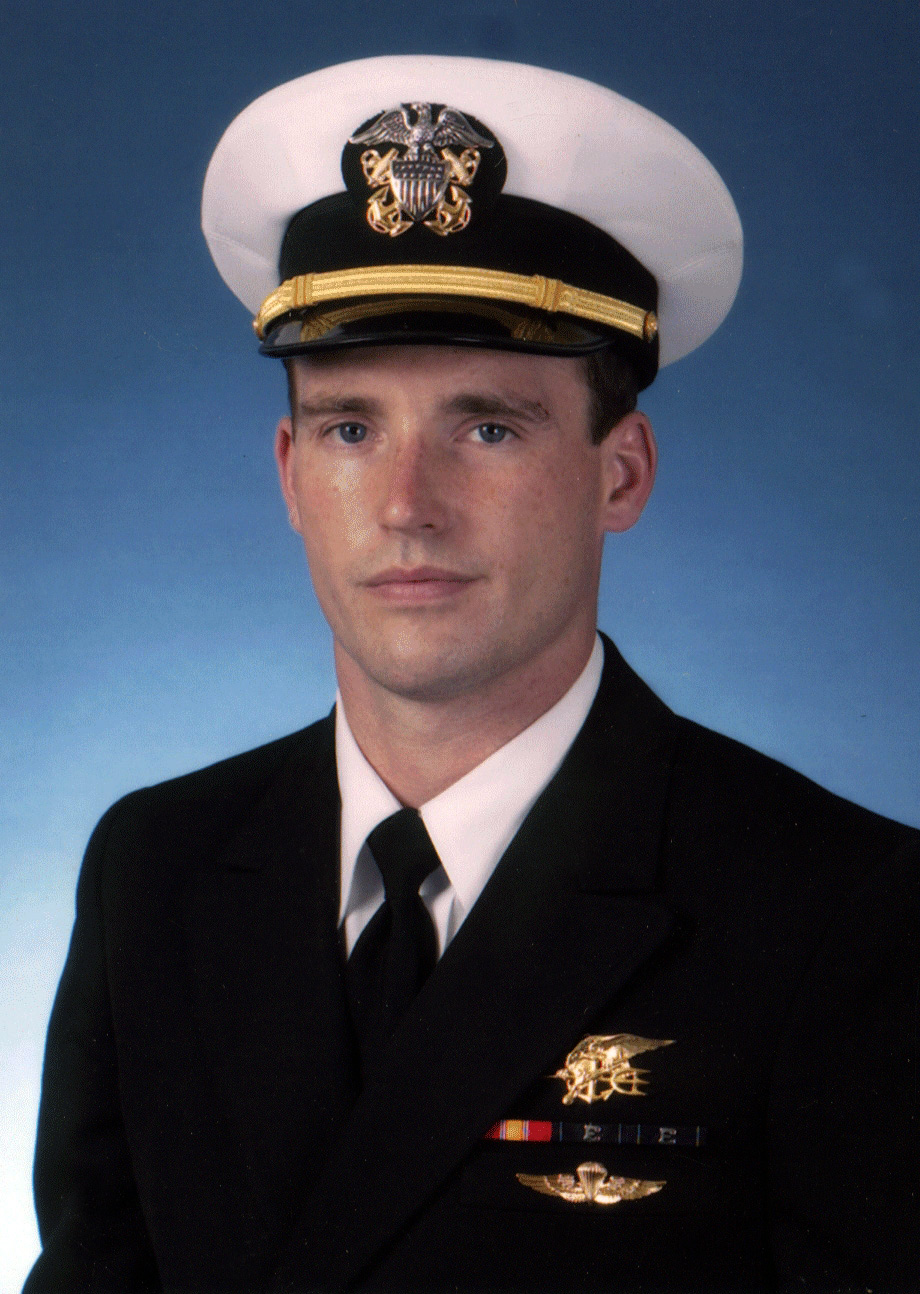
Michael P. Murphy, posthumously awarded the Medal of Honor

Name	Year	Program	Note
Edgar Mitchell	1953	OCS	Astronaut, sixth man to walk on the Moon
David E. Jeremiah	1955	OCS	Vice Chairman of the Joint Chiefs of Staff, 1990 to 1994
Jerry O. Tuttle	1956	NAVCAD	Gray Eagle
Everett Alvarez Jr.	1960	AOCS	Second longest-held prisoner of war in U.S. history
Jeremy Michael Boorda	1962	OCS	Chief of Naval Operations, 1994 to 1996
Bob Kerrey	1966	OCS	Medal of Honor awardee, 35th Governor of Nebraska, United States Senator, 1989 to 2001
John Kerry	1966	OCS	United States Senator, 1985 to 2013; United States secretary of state, 2013 to 2017
Vern Clark	1968	OCS	Chief of naval operations, 2000 to 2005
William P. Driscoll	1969	AOCS	Ace
Gregory G. Johnson	1969	AOCS	Gray Eagle
Dale Gardner	1970	AOCS	Astronaut
Joseph E. Kernan	1974	AOCS	48th governor of Indiana
Gregory C. Johnson	1977	AOCS	Astronaut
William E. Gortney	1977	AOCS	Gray Eagle
Scott Speicher	1979	AOCS	First combat casualty of the Gulf War
Robin Braun	1980	AOCS	First woman to lead any reserve component of the U.S. military
Chuck Pfarrer	1981	OCS	Assault Element Commander SEAL Team Six. Best selling author and Hollywood screenwriter of The Jackal, Hard Target, Navy SEALs, Virus, Red Planet and Darkman.
Susan L. Kilrain	1985	AOCS	Astronaut and only female naval aviator to pilot the Space Shuttle
Barry E. Wilmore	1986	AOCS	Astronaut
Erik Prince	1992	OCS	Founder of defense contracting firm Blackwater
Jocko Willink	1998	OCS	Commander, Task Unit Bruiser, Battle of Ramadi
Michael P. Murphy	2000	OCS	Posthumously awarded the Medal of Honor

== In popular culture ==
- The 1982 film An Officer and a Gentleman is set at AOCS on a fictional naval air station in Washington state.
- Beginning with the 3 April 2019 episode of the TV series SEAL Team the character of Petty Officer Lisa Davis started attending U.S. Navy OCS.

== See also ==
- Officer Candidate School (United States Army)
- Officer Candidates School (United States Marine Corps)
- Air Force Officer Training School
- Naval Reserve Officers Training Corps
- United States Naval Academy
- United States Merchant Marine Academy
