= Elizabeth Shedlick =

Navy nurse

Elizabeth Ann Shedlick
- Born: Elizabeth Ann Chapowicki; July 17, 1934; Worcester, Massachusetts
- Died: December 27, 2020 (aged 86); Arlington, Virginia
- Resting place: Arlington National Cemetery
- Education: Boston College (BSN)
- Occupation: Navy Nurse
- Spouse: Edward Shedlick
- Children: 3

Elizabeth Ann Shedlick (née Chapowicki; July 17, 1934 - December 27, 2020) was a lieutenant commander in the United States Navy who served in the White House as a chief executive nurse to President John F. Kennedy and President Lyndon B. Johnson.

== Personal life ==
=== Family, Childhood, and Education ===
Elizabeth Chapowicki was born July 17, 1934 in Worcester, Massachusetts to Stanley and Mary H. Chapowicki. She was the youngest daughter of 9 children. She attended Commerce High School, where she earned first honors. In 1956, she graduated from Boston College with a Bachelor's of Science in Nursing. Prior to entering the United States Navy, she attended the U.S. Navy’s Officer Candidate School.

=== Personal life ===
While working in the White House in the 1960s, Elizabeth met Edward Shedlick, a pastor of St. Martin of Tours Catholic Church in D.C. After Edward received a papal dispensation from Pope Paul VI to return to the laity, he and Elizabeth were married in a ceremony held on December 11, 1967. After they married, Elizabeth was pregnant with her first child and faced potential involuntary honorable discharge, as was the current military protocol for women. However, as Elizabeth did not want to leave her post, she received a waiver from President Johnson allowing her to continue her military service during her pregnancy. She was one of the first women in the United States military to give birth, remaining on active duty during and after pregnancy.

Following her retirement from the Navy in 1969, Elizabeth relocated to Montgomery County, MD. There, Elizabeth and Edward raised a family, having two more children. The couple and their three children relocated in 1979 after Edward received an appointment at the American Embassy in Paris. The family returned to their home in Maryland in 1990, and in 2001, Edward and Elizabeth moved to a home in Frederick, Maryland.

Her husband, Edward Shedlick, died of a stroke on December 16, 2004 at the age of 76. Elizabeth Shedlick died at Virginia Hospital Center, Arlington, Virginia on December 27, 2020. She had tested positive for COVID-19 ten days prior to her death. She is buried with her husband in Arlington National Cemetery.

== Career ==
=== Naval Career ===
After graduating from Boston College, Elizabeth Chapowicki attended the U.S. Navy’s Officer Candidate School and joined the Navy Nurse Corps. Elizabeth officially entered the United States Navy on June 20, 1959. She was assigned to U.S. Naval Hospital, Bethesda (now Walter Reed National Military Medical Center.)

In 1961, Elizabeth Chapowicki was vetted and selected to serve in the White House. She served as the chief executive nurse for President John F. Kennedy and President Lyndon B. Johnson. Among duties performed during her service, Lieutenant Chapowicki attended to President Kennedy regularly, including assisting in his recovery during a virus infection in 1961. An alumni publication associated with Boston College included Chapowicki's work with Kennedy among examples alumnae nurses. Following Kennedy's assassination, she retained her post in the White House. Lieutenant Chapowicki attended to President Johnson, including when he was hospitalized due to respiratory illness in January 1965 and following Johnson's gallbladder operation in October 1965.

By the end of her service in the United States Navy, she has achieved the rank of lieutenant commander. She retired on May 15, 1969. In honor of her service, she was awarded the Navy Commendation Medal and National Defense Service Medal.
