= Charles R. Brown =

American United States Navy admiral

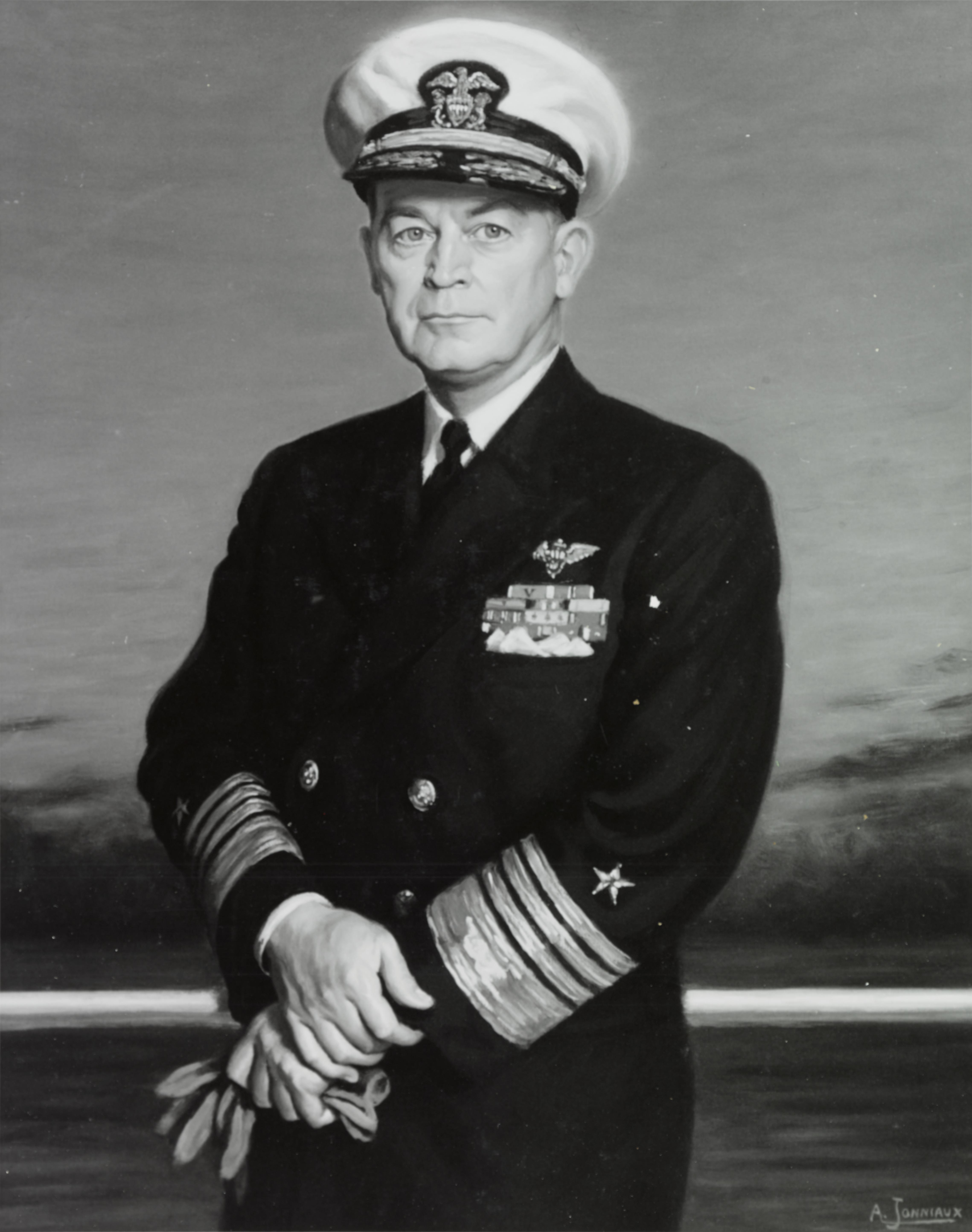
- Portrait of Admiral Brown by Alfred Jonniaux
- Born: Charles Randall Brown; 13 December 1899; Tuscaloosa, Alabama, US
- Died: 8 December 1983 (aged 83); Bethesda, Maryland, US
- Burial place: United States Naval Academy Cemetery; Annapolis, Maryland, U.S.
- Military career
- Allegiance: United States of America
- Branch: United States Navy
- Service years: 1917–1962
- Rank: Admiral
- Nickname: Cat
- Commands: USS Gannet (AM-41); USS Kalinin Bay (CVE-68); USS Hornet (CV-12); United States Sixth Fleet
- Conflicts: World War I World War II
- Awards: Distinguished Service Medal; Legion of Merit

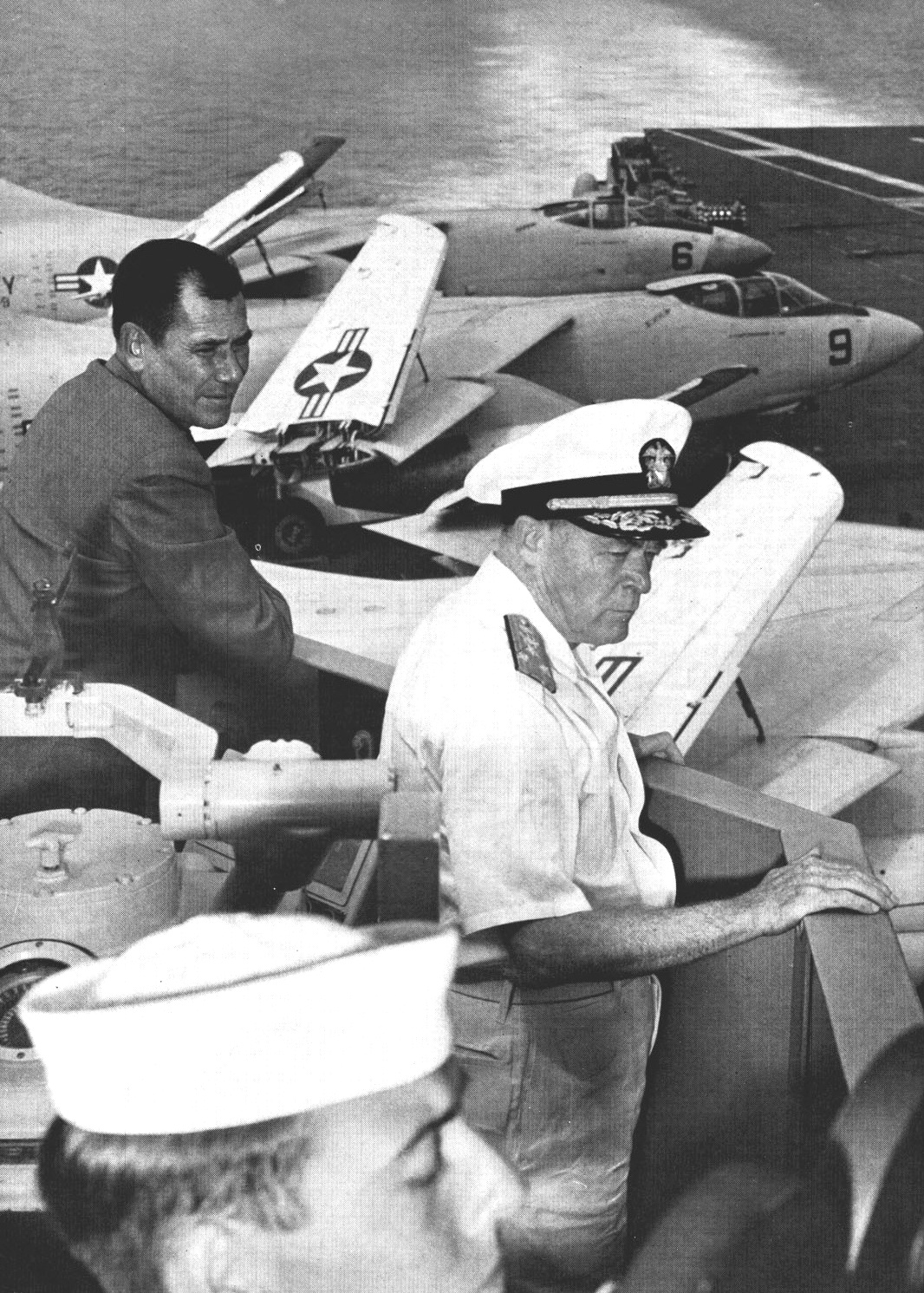
Thomas S. Gates and Brown on Saratoga, 1958

Charles Randall "Cat" Brown (23 December 1899 – 8 December 1983) was a United States Navy four-star admiral.

Brown was appointed to the United States Naval Academy in 1917, graduating in 1921. He was assigned to USS Arkansas (BB-33) in July and then transferred to USS Columbia (AG-9) in December. In December 1922, he was assigned to USS Langley (CV-1).

In February 1924, Brown reported to Naval Air Station Pensacola for flight training. He was designated a naval aviator on 15 August 1924.

As a Vice Admiral, he commanded the United States Sixth Fleet. He became the Commander in Chief, Allied Forces Southern Europe (CINCSOUTH), 1959–1961, as a full admiral. It was in this role in 1959 that he instigated the creation of the Gray Eagle Award.

== Personal ==
Brown married Eleanor T. Green on 26 November 1921.

== See also ==
- List of United States Navy four-star admirals
