= Robert F. Dunn =

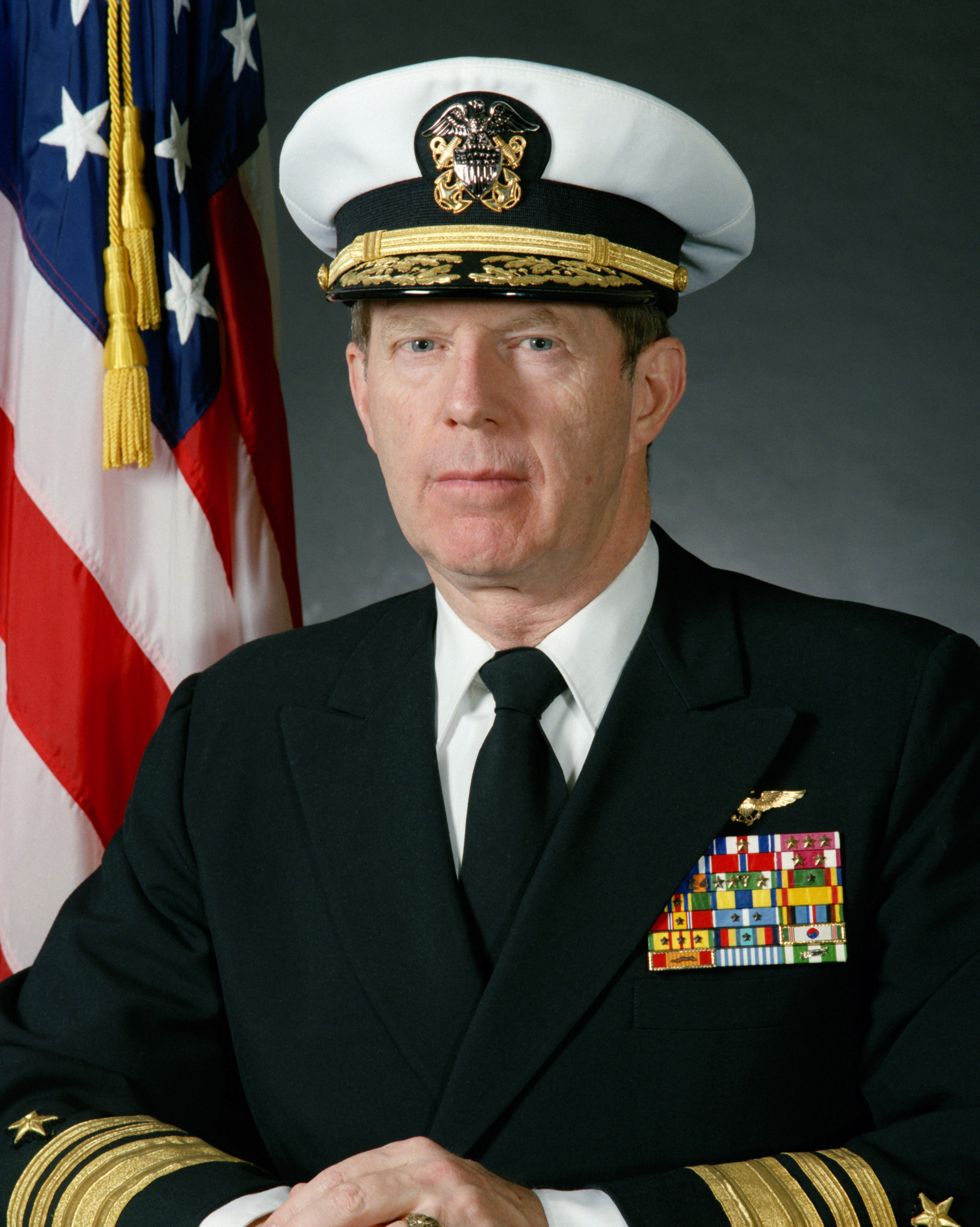
- Vice Admiral Dunn in 1988
- Born: June 15, 1928 (age 98); Chicago, Illinois
- Military career
- Allegiance: United States
- Branch: United States Navy
- Service years: 1951–1989
- Rank: Vice Admiral
- Commands: Naval Air Force Atlantic Fleet; United States Naval Reserve; Naval Military Personnel Command; Carrier Group Eight; Naval Safety Center; USS Saratoga (CV-60); USS Mount Whitney (LCC-20); Carrier Air Wing Seven; VA-146
- Conflicts: Korean War; Vietnam War
- Awards: Navy Distinguished Service Medal (2); Silver Star (2); Legion of Merit (4); Distinguished Flying Cross (2); Bronze Star Medal
- Other work: Author

Robert Francis Dunn (born June 15, 1928) is a vice admiral in the United States Navy. He was Chief of the United States Naval Reserve from October 1982 until November 1983. As a vice admiral, Dunn also served as Commander, Naval Air Force Atlantic Fleet from 1983 to 1986, and as Deputy Chief of Naval Operations for Air Warfare from 1987 to his retirement in 1989. Other commands he held include Commander Carrier Group Eight, Commander Naval Military Personnel Command, and of USS Mount Whitney (LCC-20) and USS Saratoga (CV-60).

== Early life and education ==
Born in Chicago on June 15, 1928, Dunn is a 1951 graduate of the United States Naval Academy.

== Civilian career ==
After retiring from the military, Dunn served a stint as president of the Naval Historical Foundation.

== Personal life ==
Dunn was married to Annette Brown of Pensacola, Florida, in 1953. They had two daughters and remained married until her death in 1987. He was married to Claire Snyder Leaver of Paterson, New Jersey, who had two sons, from 1987 until her death in 2022.

== Awards ==
Dunn's awards include the Gray Eagle Award, Distinguished Flying Cross, Air Medal, Silver Star and Bronze Star Medal.

== Bibliography ==
- An analysis of the value of naval air combat readiness training. Ft. Belvoir Defense Technical Information Center. OCLC 227344616.
- Gear up, mishaps down : the evolution of naval aviation safety, 1950–2000. Naval Institute Press. 2017.

=== Critical studies and reviews of Dunn's work ===
Gear up, mishaps down

- Rubel, Robert C. (Summer 2018). "[Untitled book review]". Book Reviews. Naval War College Review. 71 (3): 158–160.
