= Walter J. Davis Jr. =

American Navy admiral

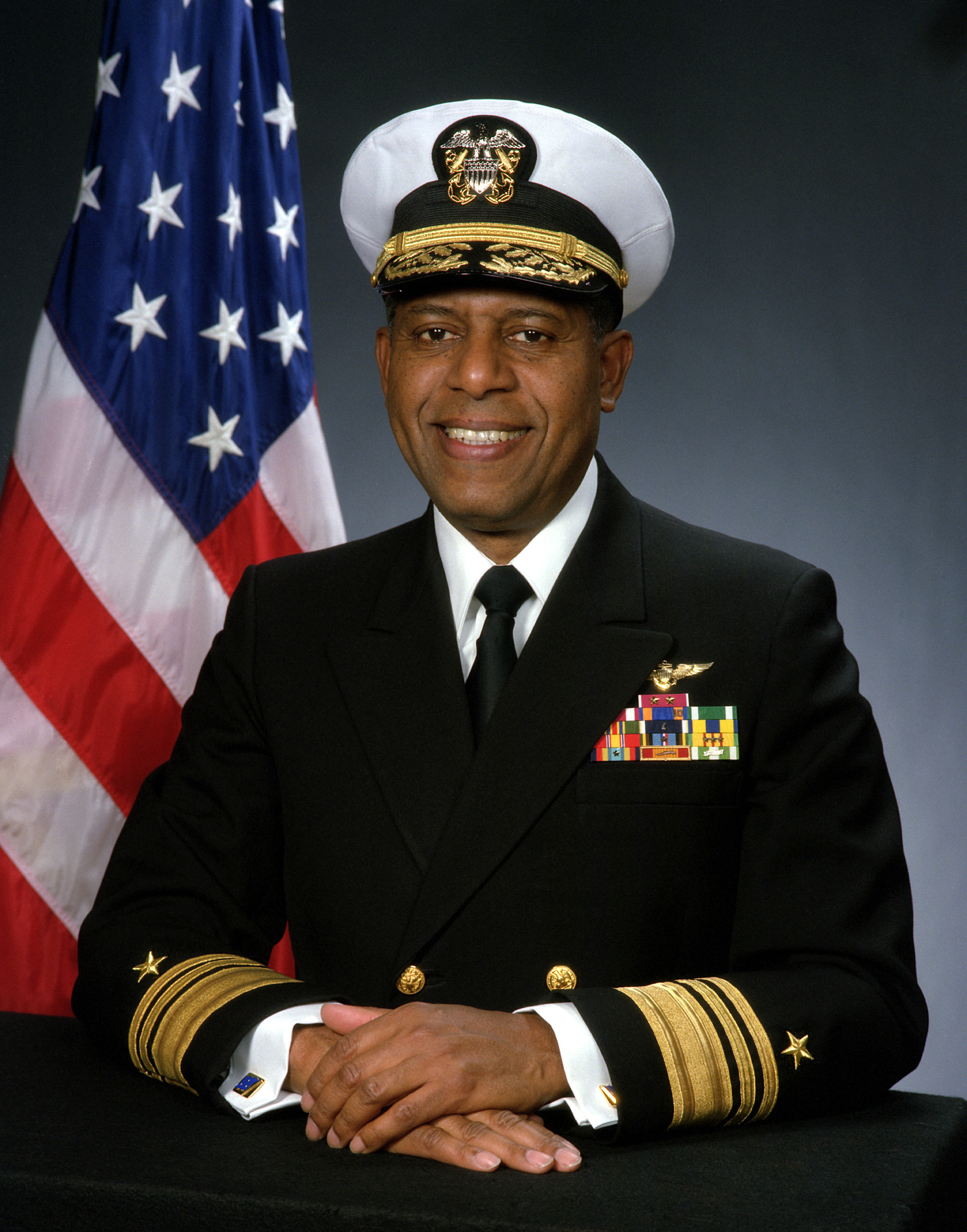
- Born: 1 August 1936 (age 90)
- Military career
- Allegiance: United States
- Branch: United States Navy
- Service years: 1959–1997
- Rank: Vice Admiral
- Commands: Carrier Group Six USS Kitty Hawk USS Ranger; USS Sacramento; VF-114
- Conflicts: Vietnam
- Awards: Legion of Merit (3)

Walter Jackson Davis Jr. (born 1 August 1936) is a retired vice admiral in the United States Navy who served as Director of Space and Electronic Warfare in the Office of the Chief of Naval Operations (CNO). From 28 February 1996 until his retirement on 1 January 1997, he was U.S. naval aviation's Gray Eagle. Davis was the second African American to become the most senior naval aviator on active duty.

== Early life and education ==
Born on 1 August 1936, Davis was raised in Winston-Salem, North Carolina. He attended the Ohio State University, graduating with a bachelor's degree in electrical engineering in 1959. Commissioned through the NROTC program in June 1959, Davis reported for flight training and, despite stigmatism in his vision, was designated a naval aviator in December 1960. He later attended the Naval Postgraduate School, earning a B.S. degree in aeronautical engineering in 1966 and a M.S. degree in aeronautical electronics in 1967.

== Military career ==
Davis served several combat tours in Southeast Asia during the Vietnam War. He accumulated over 3,500 flight hours and over 800 carrier landings as a fighter pilot flying the F-4 and F-14. Davis flew with the "Pukin Dogs" of VF-143.

As a commander, Davis served as the commanding officer of the "Aardvarks" of VF-114 from 1976 to 1977. He was XO on the USS Kitty Hawk until he was promoted to captain in March 1981

Promoted to captain, Davis was given command of the combat support ship Sacramento from 21 December 1981 to 2 September 1983. He subsequently served as the commanding officer of the carrier Ranger from 26 June 1985 to 8 May 1987.

Approved for promotion to rear admiral (lower half) in April 1988, Davis served as commanding officer of Carrier Group Six in 1991 and 1992. His flagship the carrier Forrestal was deployed to the Mediterranean and Aegean Seas immediately after the Gulf War to provide air support for Operation Provide Comfort in Iraq.

Promoted to rear admiral, Davis served as Director of Warfare Systems Architecture and Engineering for the Space and Naval Warfare Systems Command (SPAWAR). Approved for promotion to vice admiral in September 1994, his final active duty assignment until his retirement at the beginning of 1997 was as Deputy Chief of Naval Operations (N6) for Space, Information Warfare, Command and Control.

== Later life ==
Davis is a co-founder of EvoNexus, a San Diego, California-area business incubator which has helped over 200 start-up companies during their growth from idea to realization. At the beginning of 2020, eighty-five percent of these remained in business.

== Personal ==
Davis is the son of Walter Jackson Davis Sr. (28 August 1910 – 20 September 1994) and Inez May Stout. The couple were married on 15 August 1935 in Winston-Salem, North Carolina.

In December 1960, Davis Jr. married Constance Patricia "Connie" Surles in Escambia County, Florida. They have two children and four grandchildren and live in Poway, California.
