= Robert F. Schoultz =

Vice admiral in the US Navy from 1943 to 1987

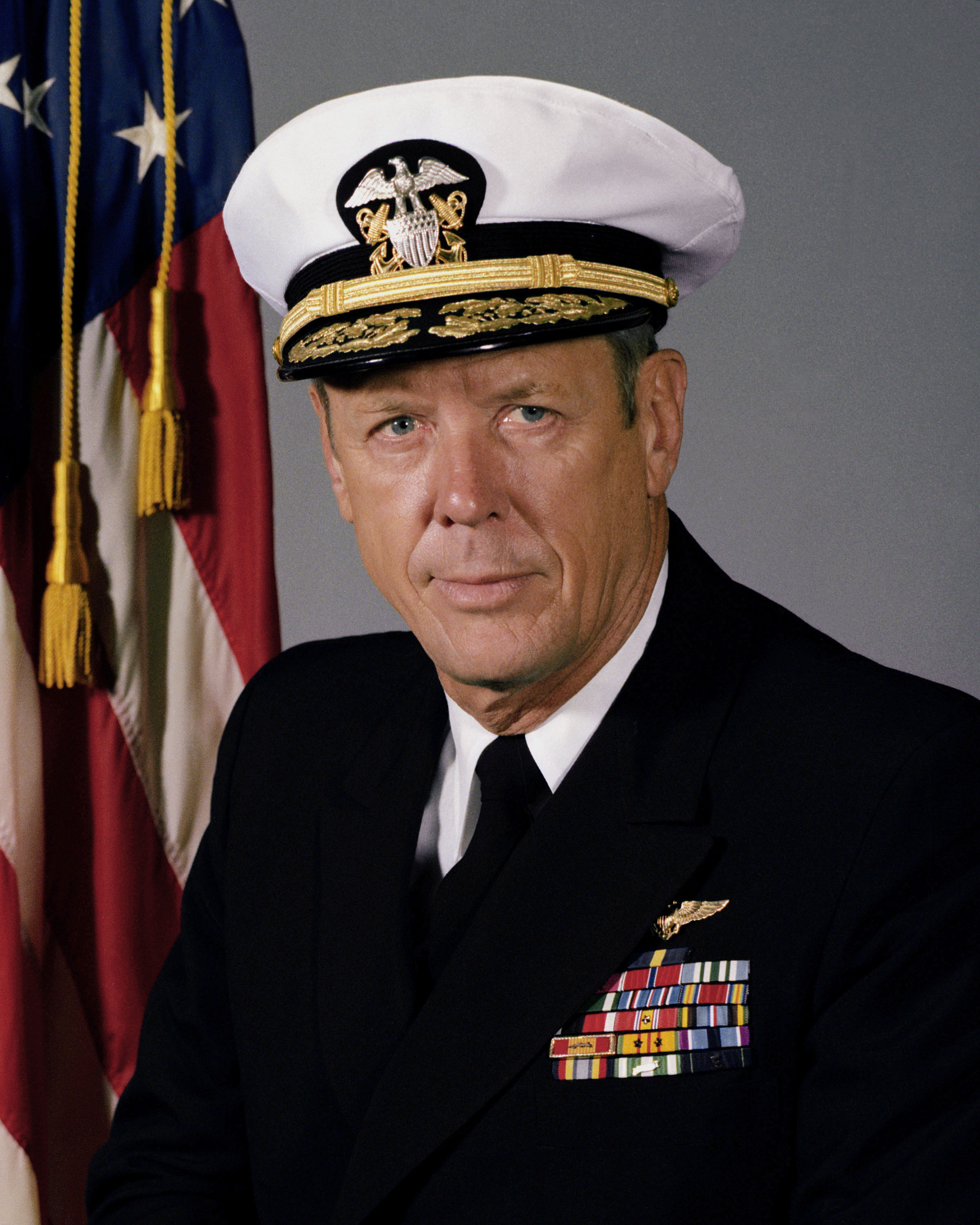
- Born: February 9, 1925; Racine, Wisconsin, U.S.
- Died: October 9, 2017 (aged 92); Arizona, U.S.
- Military career
- Allegiance: United States
- Branch: United States Navy
- Service years: 1943–1987
- Rank: Vice Admiral

Robert Francis "Dutch" Schoultz (February 9, 1925 – October 9, 2017) was a vice admiral in the United States Navy. He was a former commander of the Naval Air Force U.S. Pacific Fleet and a former Deputy Commander in Chief of U.S. Naval Forces Europe/U.S. Commander Eastern Atlantic. He also served as Deputy Chief of Naval Operations for Air Warfare. From June 26, 1981 until his retirement on February 17, 1987, he was U.S. naval aviation's Gray Eagle, the second longest serving senior active-duty naval aviator. In retirement he became president of Rosco, Inc., an aerospace industry consulting firm, and served on the board of Reflectone Inc.

Schoultz was born in Racine, Wisconsin and raised in Omaha, Nebraska. After graduating from Omaha Central High School in 1942, he enrolled in the NROTC program at the University of Nebraska. Schoultz began training to be an officer and pilot in August 1943. He was designated a naval aviator on September 1, 1945, too late to see combat during World War II. Schoultz was then assigned to the torpedo and attack squadrons on the carrier Midway.

From March 27, 1962 to March 2, 1963, Schoultz served as commanding officer of VA-93 deployed on the carrier Ranger. He later served as executive officer of the carrier Franklin D. Roosevelt. Schoultz was given command of the attack cargo ship Arneb from December 20, 1969 to January 1971 and the carrier Forrestal from June 23, 1971 to November 1, 1972. He was on staff duty and professional education in 1973-77, then from April 1977 to July 1979 was commander of Carrier Group Two assigned to the United States Sixth Fleet. Following this he had a brief tour on the OPNAV staff before becoming Commander, Naval Air Force, US Pacific Fleet, in January 1980. In 1983 he became Deputy Chief of Naval Operations (Air Warfare), then from February 1, 1985 until his retirement in 1987 was US Commander Eastern Atlantic and Deputy Commander in Chief US Naval Forces, Europe.

His awards include the Distinguished Service Medal (three awards), Legion of Merit (three awards), Bronze Star Medal, Joint Service Medal, Navy Commendation Medal, American Campaign Medal, World War II Victory Medal, Armed Forces Expeditionary Medal, Republic of Korea National Security Merit Gugseon Medal, Vietnam Service Medal with six Bronze Stars, and the Republic of Vietnam Campaign Medal with Device.

== Personal ==
His wife Rosemary Parker Schoultz served as the sponsor for the dock landing ship Tortuga. In their later years, Schoultz and his wife moved to Arizona. The couple had two sons, four grandchildren and, as of 2017, one great granddaughter. Their eldest son Robert Parker "Bob" Schoultz is a retired Navy SEAL captain.

After his death in 2017, Schoultz was interred at Arlington National Cemetery on April 25, 2018.
