= William D. Houser =

United States admiral

- Born: November 11, 1921; Atlanta, Georgia
- Died: February 5, 2012 (aged 90); Bethesda, Maryland
- Military career
- Allegiance: United States
- Branch: United States Navy
- Service years: 1941–1976
- Rank: Vice Admiral
- Commands: Carrier Division 2 USS Constellation; USS Mauna Loa; VF-124; VF-44
- Conflicts: World War II; Korean War; Vietnam War
- Awards: Navy Distinguished Service Medal; Legion of Merit (4); Bronze Star Medal; Air Medal (2); Navy and Marine Corps Commendation Medal (6)

William Douglas Houser (November 11, 1921 – February 5, 2012) was a United States Navy officer who later served as a telecommunications executive.

== Naval career ==
Houser joined the United States Navy in 1941 and fought in World War II. His military career began aboard USS Nashville (CL-43) in 1941. In 1944 the vessel was subject to a kamikaze attack that killed 131 people and injured many others.

After World War II, Houser became a Naval Aviator. He soon rose through the ranks to become operations officer and an executive officer of Fighter Squadron One-L. In the Korean War, Houser was assigned as commander of Fighter Squadron 44 and was awarded a Bronze Star Medal for his combat skills.

After Korea, Houser was with Air Development Squadron Three and later commanded Fighter Squadron 124, which was the navy's largest at the time. He also fought in the Vietnam War, serving in 1966 as commander of the Kitty Hawk-class aircraft carrier USS Constellation (CV-64). His Vietnam service earned him the Legion of Merit.

Houser served as a member of the joint staff of the Joint Chiefs of Staff from 1960 to 1962 and again from 1967 to 1968. He was military assistant to the Secretary of Defense from 1962 to 1963, Director of Aviation Plans and Requirements of the United States Navy from 1968 to 1970, Commander of Carrier Division 2 of the United States Atlantic and Mediterranean Fleets from 1970 to 1972, and Deputy Chief of Naval Operations from 1972 to 1976.

In 1972 Houser was promoted to vice admiral. He retired from military service in 1976.

During Houser's time in non-combat positions he was responsible for keeping on the F-14 fighter aircraft, which was at risk of termination.

== Telecommunications career ==
After his military service he pursued a career in the telecommunications industry. This began as director of satellite interconnection for the Corporation for Public Broadcasting from 1976 to 1979. He then moved on to serve as director of special projects of the Communications Satellite Corporation from 1979 to 1981 and Vice President from 1981 to 1984. He then went on to serve as President of StrataCom's predecessor company, Packet Technologies (1984–1986), the Fort Scott Corporation (1986–1988), Interfax (1989–1991), and Com21 (1991–1994). While at COMSAT in 1980 and working on a business plan for telecommunications satellite parks, Admiral Houser created the word "teleport."

== Education ==
Houser received a Bachelor of Science from the United States Naval Academy in 1941, a Master of Science from George Washington University in 1963 and also studied at the University of Maryland, College of Special & Continuation Studies, the Naval War College, and Harvard University.

== Organizations and clubs ==
Houser was a member of the Bohemian Club of San Francisco, California.

== Death ==
Houser died on February 5, 2012. He had suffered from Alzheimer's disease and pneumonia.
