= Barrett Tillman =

American author (born 1948)

Henry Barrett Tillman
- Born: 1948 (age 77–78); Oregon
- Occupation: Author
- Writing career
- Period: 1964–present
- Website: www.btillman.com

Henry Barrett Tillman (born 1948) is an American author who specializes in naval and aviation topics in addition to fiction and technical writing.

Tillman's most influential book to date is On Yankee Station (1987), written with John B. Nichols. It is a critical appraisal of naval aviation in the Vietnam War. According to Tillman, it was added to the US Air Force and Marine Corps professional reading lists, and at least one squadron took copies of the book with them to Operation Desert Storm as "a reality check on tactics".

== Biography ==
=== Early life ===
Born a fourth-generation Oregonian, descended from American pioneers, American Revolutionary War Patriots, Pilgrims (i.e. Priscilla Alden) and Pocahontas, Tillman was raised on the family wheat and cattle ranch. His younger brothers include a breeder of exotic animals and a Rhodes Scholar. In high school he was an Eagle Scout, won two state titles as a rudimental drummer, and was a champion speaker and debater. Tillman was first published in 1964 at age 15 and graduated from the University of Oregon in 1971 with a bachelor's degree in journalism.

Like his father, a Navy trained pilot in World War II, Tillman developed an early passion for aviation and learned to fly at age 16. Over the next several years, he flew a variety of vintage and historic aircraft, including a pre-WW II Navy trainer and a restored dive-bomber. The latter became the subject of his first book, The Dauntless Dive Bomber of World War II, published in 1976. It established the format for many subsequent books, operational histories of U.S. Navy aircraft.

=== Marriage and children ===
Tillman lives in Mesa, Arizona with his wife, Sally.

=== Career ===
After college Tillman worked as a freelance writer until 1982 when he founded Champlin Fighter Museum Press in Mesa, Arizona, publishing out-of-print and new titles on military aviation.

In 1986, he moved to San Diego to become managing editor of The Hook, quarterly journal of the Tailhook Association. He remained in that position for three years before deciding to focus full-time to writing fiction. His first novel was published in June 1990. Warriors depicted a Mideast air war and became an immediate best seller when Iraq invaded Kuwait two months later.

Tillman's next two novels appeared in 1992: The Sixth Battle, (written with his brother John) which captured a wide following among computer war gamers; and Dauntless, intended as the first in a trilogy. It was followed by Hellcats, nominated as military novel of the year in 1996. He has also published original fiction in the Stephen Coonts anthologies, Combat and Victory.

Tillman remains active as a magazine writer. He is a regular contributor to The Hook, Aviation History, and several firearms publications. He has also reported from Africa for Soldier of Fortune magazine.

Tillman is a former executive secretary of the American Fighter Aces Association.

== Works ==
=== Published works ===
==== Nonfiction ====
- Jimmy Doolittle: The First 80 Years (1976) OCLC 11192821
- The Dauntless Dive-Bomber of World War II (1976) ISBN 0870215698
- Hellcat: the F6F in World War II (1979) ISBN 0870212656
- Corsair: the F4U in World War II and Korea (1979) ISBN 0870211315
- On Yankee Station: the Naval Air War Over Vietnam (1987) (with CDR John B. Nichols, USN (Ret)) OCLC 18508310
- TBF-TBM Avenger at War (1979, re-released 1991) ISBN 1557500401
- MiG Master: Story of the F-8 Crusader (1980, second edition 1990) ISBN 0933852177
- Wildcat: the F4F in World War II (1983, second edition 1990) ISBN 0933852320
- Sun Downers: VF-11 in World War II (1993) ISBN 0962586080
- The Marianas Turkey Shoot, June 19–20, 1944: Carrier Battle in the Philippine Sea (Phalanx Pub. Co., 1994) ISBN 1883809045
- Pushing the Envelope: The Career of Test Pilot Marion Carl (1994) (with MajGen Marion E. Carl, USMC (Ret.)) Reissued in 2005 by Naval Institute Press. ISBN 1557501165
- Wildcat Aces of World War II (1995) ISBN 1855324865
- Wildcats to Tomcats: The Tailhook Navy (1995) (with CAPTs W.M. Schirra, R.L. Cormier & P.R. Wood, USN (Ret.))
- Carrier Air War: World War II in Original Color (1996) (with Robert L. Lawson.) Reissued as World War II U.S. Navy Air Combat, (2002)
- Hellcat Aces of World War II (1996) ISBN 1855325969
- Warbird Tech: Vought F4U Corsair (1997) ISBN 0933424671
- U.S. Navy Fighter Squadrons of World War II (Specialty Press, 1997) ISBN 0933424744
- Helldiver Units of World War II (Osprey, 1997) ISBN 1855326892
- U.S. Navy Fighters of World War II (MBI Pub. Co., 1998) (with R.L. Lawson) ISBN 0760305595
- SBD Dauntless Units of World War II (Osprey, 1998) ISBN 9781855327320
- TBF/TBM Avenger Units of World War 2 (Osprey, 1999) ISBN 1855329026
- TBD Devastator Units of the U. S. Navy (Osprey, 2000) ISBN 1841760250
- TBF Avenger Units of World War II (2000)
- The Complete Guide to AR-15 Accuracy (2000) (with Derrick Martin) ISBN 0967094852
- U.S. Navy Dive and Torpedo Bombers (MBI Pub. Co., 2001) (with R.L. Lawson) ISBN 0760309590
- Above & Beyond: The Aviation Medals of Honor (2002) ISBN 1588340562
- The Alpha Bravo Delta Guide to the U.S. Air Force (Alpha, 2003) ISBN 0028644948
- Brassey's D-Day Encyclopedia (2004); (Second edition, Regnery, 2014) ISBN 1574887602
- Clash of the Carriers: The True Story of the Marianas Turkey Shoot of World War II (2005) ISBN 0451216709
- Heroes: Army Recipients of the Medal of Honor (2006) ISBN 0425210170
- LeMay (2007) ISBN 9781403971357
- What We Need: Extravagance and Shortages in America's Military (2007) ISBN 9780760328699
- VF-11/111 'Sundowners' 1942-95 (Osprey, 2010) (with Henk van der Lugt) ISBN 9781846034848
- Whirlwind: The Air War Against Japan 1942–1945 (2010) ISBN 9781416584407
- Enterprise: America's Fightingest Ship and The Men Who Helped Win World War II (2012) ISBN 9781439190876
- Forgotten Fifteenth: The Daring Airmen Who Crippled Hitler's War Machine (Regnery Publishing, Inc., 2014) ISBN 9781621572084
- US Marine Corps Fighter Squadrons of World War II (Osprey, 2014) ISBN 9781782004103
- On Wave and Wing: The 100 Year Quest to Perfect the Aircraft Carrier (Regnery History, 2017) ISBN 1621575918
- Dragon's Jaw: An Epic Story of Courage and Tenacity in Vietnam with Stephen Coonts. (Da Capo, 2019) ISBN 0306903474
- When the Shooting Stopped: August 1945 (Bloomsbury-Osprey, 2022) ISBN 1472848985

Chapters in non-fiction works:

- R.L. Lawson, ed. History of U.S. Naval Air Power (1985)
- Jacobs, Jan; Tillman, Barrett (August 1990), "The Wolf Gang: A History of Carrier Air Group 84", The Hook, 18 (WWII special issue): 78–87.
- Saburō Sakai Samurai! (1991)
- Steve Coonts, ed. War in the Air (1996)
- Jack Sweetmen, ed. Great American Naval Battles (1998)
- Hill Goodspeed, ed. U.S. Naval Aviation (2001)
- Tom Clancy series, revised chapter Fighter Wing (2004)
- Walter Boyne, ed. Today's Best Military Writing (2004)

Introductions to:

- Another Country by Jeff Cooper (2005)
- Fire Works by Jeff Cooper (2005)
- To Ride, Shoot Straight & Speak the Truth by Jeff Cooper (2005)
- Wings of Valor: Honoring America’s Fighter Aces.(2016)

==== Fiction ====
- Warriors (1990) (with CDR John B. Nichols, USN (Ret)) ISBN 0553348817
- The Sixth Battle (1992) (with John L. Tillman) ISBN 0553294628
- Dauntless: A Novel of Midway and Guadalcanal (Bantam Books, 1992) ISBN 0553075284
- Hellcats: A Novel of the Pacific War (Brassey's, 1996) ISBN 1574880934
- "Skyhawks Forever." Combat (2001) (Steve Coonts, ed., et al.)
- "I Relieve You, Sir." A Date Which Will Live in Infamy (2001) (Brian Thomsen and Martin Greenberg, eds., et al.)
- "Flame On Tarawa." Victory (2003) (Steve Coonts, ed., et al.)
- Pandora's Legion (2007) with Harold Coyle ISBN 9780765313713
- Prometheus' Child (2007) with Harold Coyle ISBN 0765313723
- Vulcan's Fire (2008) with Harold Coyle ISBN 9780765313737

== Awards ==
As of 2021 Tillman has received ten history and writing awards including the second Admiral Radford Award for Naval History and Literature and is an honorary member of three Navy squadrons. He has been honored by the Air Force Historical Foundation, the American Aviation Historical Society, and twice by the U.S. Naval Institute. He received the Lifetime Achievement award from the Tailhook Association in 1998.
