= Gray Eagle Award =

Trophy for US Naval Aviators

The Gray Eagle Award is presented to the Naval Aviator on continuous active duty in United States Navy or United States Marine Corps who has held that designation for the longest period of time. A similar trophy, the Gray Owl Award, is also presented to the Naval Flight Officer on continuous active duty in the U.S. Navy or Marine Corps who has held that designation for the longest period of time.

Because they are also considered Naval Aviators, a third award, the Ancient Albatross Award, is the equivalent to the Gray Eagle Award in the United States Coast Guard and is presented under circumstances similar to that of the Gray Eagle.

== History ==
The Gray Eagle Trophy made its first appearance in 1961 during the Navy's celebration of the Fiftieth Anniversary of Naval Aviation.

=== The original idea ===
In 1959, while serving as Commander in Chief, Allied Forces, Southern Europe, Admiral Charles R. Brown, USN, wrote to the Deputy Chief of Naval Operations (Air), Vice Admiral Robert B. Pirie, USN, telling of certain discussions he had with Vice Admiral George W. Anderson, then serving as Commander, Sixth Fleet.

"We suggest that it be determined from official records who, at all times, is the senior aviator in point of service in flying; that a baton or similar token be awarded him, and that, with due ceremony, this symbol be handed on down to the next man with the passing years."

Admiral Pirie took the matter from there. For a time the title "Bull Naval Aviator" was a leading contender for the choice of names for the senior aviator's title. Various cups, statuettes, plaques and medals were proposed. Finally, a competition was conducted between aircraft companies desiring to sponsor the award. The design from the Chance Vought Aircraft Company (later LTV Corporation, Ling-Temco-Vought) was selected, and the Gray Eagle Award was brought into reality.

=== The first ceremony ===
On 5 January 1961, at Naval Aviation's Fiftieth Anniversary Ball, held at the Sheraton Park Hotel, Washington, D.C., Admiral Charles R. Brown received the Gray Eagle Trophy from Admiral James S. Russell, then serving as Vice Chief of Naval Operations.

While Admiral Brown was the first "active" aviator to receive the Trophy, replicas of the award were presented to all previous holders of the distinction, or their representative, during the ceremony. The recipients included Mrs. T. G. Ellyson, widow of Naval Aviator Number One, Commander Theodore G. Ellyson. Commander Ellyson would have held the Gray Eagle title from 1911 to 1928, if the award had been in existence.

== The Trophy ==
The Trophy, donated by Chance Vought Aircraft (now Ling-Temco-Vought) depicts a silver eagle landing into the arresting gear of the Navy's first aircraft carrier, USS Langley (CV-1). The inscription reads:

"The Venerable Order of the Gray Eagle. The Most Ancient Naval Aviator on Active Duty. In recognition of a clear eye, a stout heart, a steady hand, and a daring defiance of gravity and the law of averages".

Names of those who have held the title, either actively or prior to the 1961 ceremony, are inscribed on the trophy's plaque.

The Gray Eagle Trophy may be kept in possession of and displayed by the command to which the Gray Eagle is assigned. Otherwise, it may be placed in the custody of the National Museum of Naval Aviation on a temporary basis until required for presentation to the successor. The ceremony date for the presentation of the Gray Eagle Award and the retirement date are not always the same.

The award is passed down from the previous holder of the award on his or her retirement, or in case of death. A miniature replica is presented to each incumbent as a personal memento.

== Eligibility ==
Eligibility for the Gray Eagle Award is determined by the official active-duty precedence list for Naval Aviators, on continuous service, not recalled, who has held that designation for the longest period of time. The date of designation as a Naval Aviator is the governing factor for determining who will receive the award from the list of active duty officers. In the event that two or more aviators on active duty have been designated on the same date, the senior one qualified as the Gray Eagle.

"The senior Navy or Marine Corps aviator maintains the title of Gray Eagle until the member retires and a new recipient is named from the official precedence list of prospective Gray Eagles, maintained by the Office of the Chief of Naval Operations."

== Recipients ==
Name	Rank (death/retire)	Naval Aviator No.	Date as Naval Aviator	Dates as Gray Eagle
Theodore G. Ellyson	CDR	1	2 June 1911	2 June 1911 – 27 February 1928
John H. Towers	ADM	3	14 September 1911	27 February 1928 – 1 December 1947
George D. Murray	VADM	22	20 September 1915	1 December 1947 – 1 August 1951
DeWitt C. Ramsey	ADM	45	31 May 1917	1 December 1947 – 1 May 1949
Henry T. Stanley	CAPT	186	17 December 1917	1 May 1949 – 1 September 1950
William W. Townsley	CAPT	320	13 February 1918	1 August 1951 – 1 July 1955
Alvin O. Preil	CAPT	538	11 March 1918	1 July 1955 – 1 January 1959
Irving M. McQuiston	RADM	905	12 June 1918	1 January 1959 – 1 July 1959
Alfred M. Pride	VADM	1119	17 September 1918	1 July 1959 – 1 October 1959
Thomas S. Combs	VADM	3064	21 December 1922	1 October 1959 – 1 April 1960
Charles R. Brown *	ADM	3159	15 August 1924	1 April 1960 – 2 January 1962
Frank Akers	RADM	3228	11 September 1925	2 January 1962 – 1 April 1963
Wallace M. Beakley	RADM	3312	24 November 1926	1 April 1963 – 31 December 1963
Robert Goldthwaite	RADM	3364	20 May 1927	31 December 1963 – 1 October 1965
Richard C. Mangrum	LtGen (USMC)	4447	20 May 1929	1 October 1965 – 30 June 1967
Fitzhugh Lee III	VADM	3512	16 September 1929	30 June 1967 – 31 July 1967
Charles D. Griffin	ADM	3647	6 June 1930	31 July 1967 – 1 February 1968
Alexander S. Heyward, Jr.	VADM	3867	23 November 1931	1 February 1968 – 1 August 1968
Robert J. Stroh	RADM	3888	25 January 1932	1 August 1968 – 28 November 1969
George P. Koch	RADM	4085	2 January 1935	28 November 1969 – 31 July 1971
Alfred R. Matter	RADM	4164	30 October 1935	31 July 1971 – 29 February 1972
Francis D. Foley	RADM	4178	1 February 1936	29 February 1972 – 29 June 1972
Thomas H. Moorer	ADM	4255	12 June 1936	29 June 1972 – 30 June 1974
Leroy V. Swanson	RADM	5921	9 December 1938	30 June 1974 – 29 August 1975
Noel A. M. Gayler	ADM	6879	14 November 1940	29 August 1975 – 31 August 1976
Martin D. Carmody	RADM	10911	22 January 1942	31 August 1976 – 27 May 1977
George L. Cassel	RADM	11262	3 February 1942	27 May 1977 – 31 August 1977
Henry Wildfang	CWO4 (USMC)	12766	16 April 1942	31 August 1977 – 31 May 1978
Frank C. Lang	MajGen (USMC)	-	12 March 1943	31 May 1978 – 30 June 1978
Thomas H. Miller, Jr.	LtGen (USMC)	-	24 April 1943	30 June 1978 – 28 June 1979
Maurice F. Weisner	ADM	-	May 1943	28 June 1979 – 31 October 1979
Andrew W. O’Donnell	LtGen (USMC)	-	8 July 1944	31 October 1979 – 26 June 1981
Robert F. Schoultz	VADM	-	1 September 1945	26 June 1981 – 17 February 1987
Cecil J. Kempf	VADM	-	Nov 1951	25 February 1987 – 6 June 1987
James E. Service	VADM	-	9 April 1952	6 June 1987 – 21 August 1987
Frank E. Petersen, Jr.	LtGen (USMC)	-	Oct 1952	21 August 1987 – 15 June 1988
Ronald J. Hays	ADM	-	-	15 June 1988 – 15 September 1988
Robert F. Dunn	VADM	-	-	15 September 1988 – 25 May 1989
Huntington Hardisty	ADM	-	-	25 May 1989 – 1 March 1991
Jerome L. Johnson	ADM	-	-	1 March 1991 – 26 July 1992
Edwin R. Kohn	VADM	-	Jun 1956	26 July 1992 – 1 July 1993
Jerry O. Tuttle	VADM	-	Oct 1956	1 July 1993 – 19 November 1993
Stanley R. Arthur	ADM	-	-	19 November 1993 – 21 March 1995
David R. Morris	RADM	-	-	21 March 1995 – 28 February 1996
Walter J. Davis, Jr.	VADM	-	Dec 1960	28 February 1996 – 1 January 1997
Luther F. Schriefer	RADM	-	Oct 1961	1 January 1997 – 1 February 1997
Andrew A. Granuzzo	RADM	-	Feb 1963	1 February 1997 – 24 March 2000
James I. Maslowski	RADM	-	-	24 March 2000 – 20 December 2000
Arthur K. Cebrowski	VADM	-	-	20 December 2000 – 16 August 2001
Robert M. Nutwell	RADM	-	-	16 August 2001 – 26 September 2001
Michael D. Haskins	VADM	-	Sept 1968	26 September 2001 – 1 January 2003
Charles W. Moore, Jr.	VADM	-	-	1 January 2003 – 1 October 2004
Gregory G. Johnson	ADM	-	-	1 October 2004 – 29 November 2004
Robert Magnus	Gen (USMC)	-	-	29 November 2004 – 17 July 2008
James F. Amos	Gen (USMC)	-	-	17 July 2008 – 17 October 2014
William E. Gortney	ADM	-	-	18 October 2014 – 28 February 2017
Scott Swift	ADM	-	-	1 March 2017 – Current (retired on 17 May 2018)

* Charles R. Brown was the first to receive the award while on active duty; earlier awards were retroactive.
** Naval Aviator designation numbers were not issued after the beginning of World War II.
