= Jerry O. Tuttle =

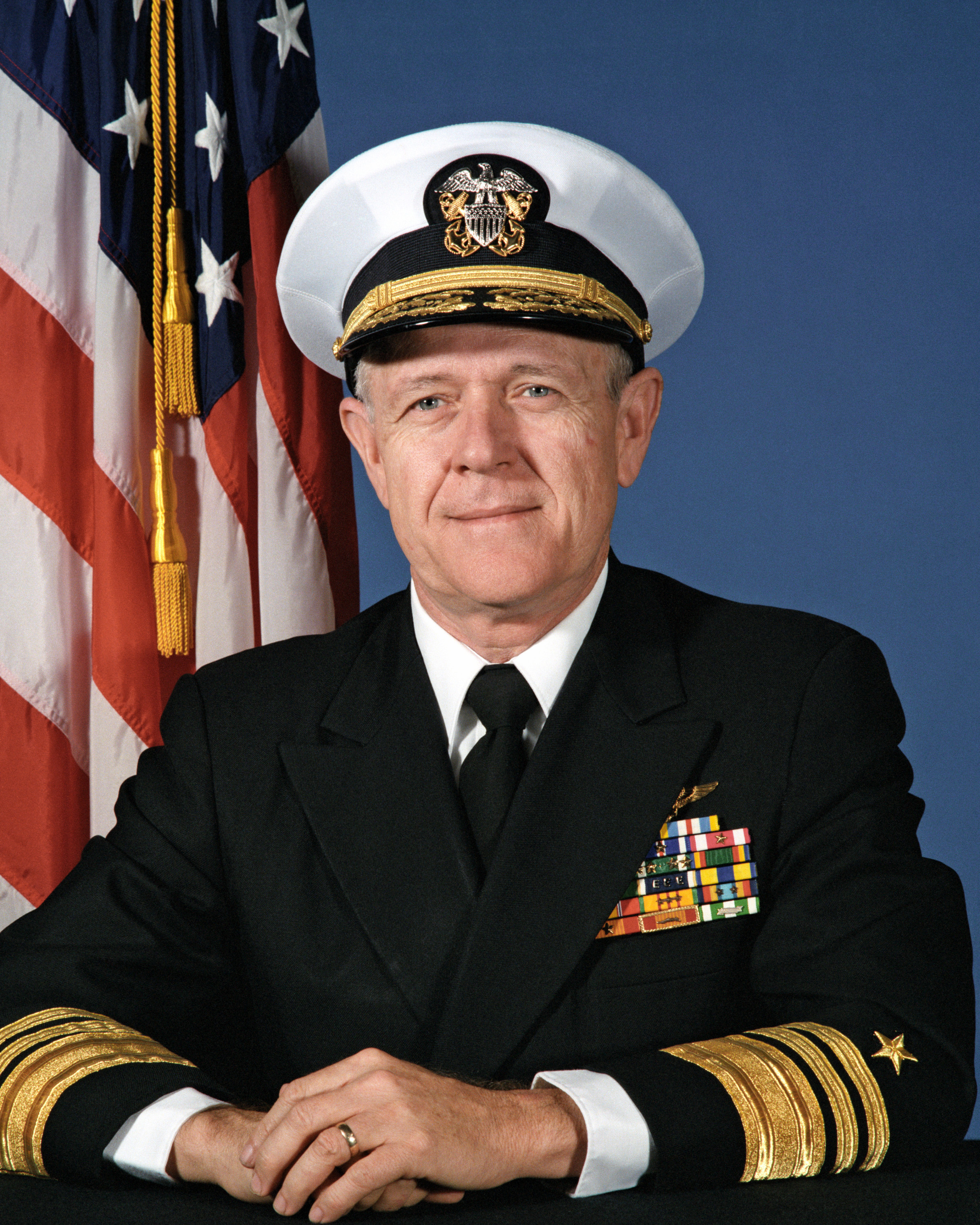
- Vice Admiral Tuttle in 1987
- Born: December 18, 1934; Hatfield, Indiana, U.S.
- Died: October 30, 2018 (aged 83); Fairfax, Virginia, U.S.
- Military career
- Allegiance: United States
- Branch: United States Navy
- Service years: 1955–1994
- Rank: Vice admiral
- Conflicts: Vietnam War

Jerry Owen Tuttle (December 18, 1934 – October 30, 2018) was a vice admiral in the United States Navy. He was the second Captain of USS Kalamazoo (AOR-6) and commanded the USS John F. Kennedy; Naval Inspector General; Deputy and Chief of Staff for the Commander in Chief, U.S. Atlantic Fleet; Special Assistant to the Chief of Naval Operations; and Deputy Director for Intelligence, Defense Intelligence Agency.

His awards include the Defense Distinguished Service Medal, Navy Distinguished Service Medal (2), Defense Superior Service Medal, Legion of Merit (4), Distinguished Flying Cross (3), Meritorious Service Medal (2), Air Medal (25), Navy Commendation Medal (4), and Letter of Commendation from the Japan Defense Agency. He was also a recipient of the Gray Eagle Award.

== Early Navy career ==
Tuttle joined the Navy in March 1955 and was soon selected for the Naval Aviation Cadet Program. He was designated a Naval Aviator and commissioned as an Ensign after completing his flight training in October 1956. After studying at the Naval Postgraduate School, Tuttle was awarded a bachelor's degree in Communications Engineering in 1965. He later earned a master's degree in International Relations from George Washington University in 1969.

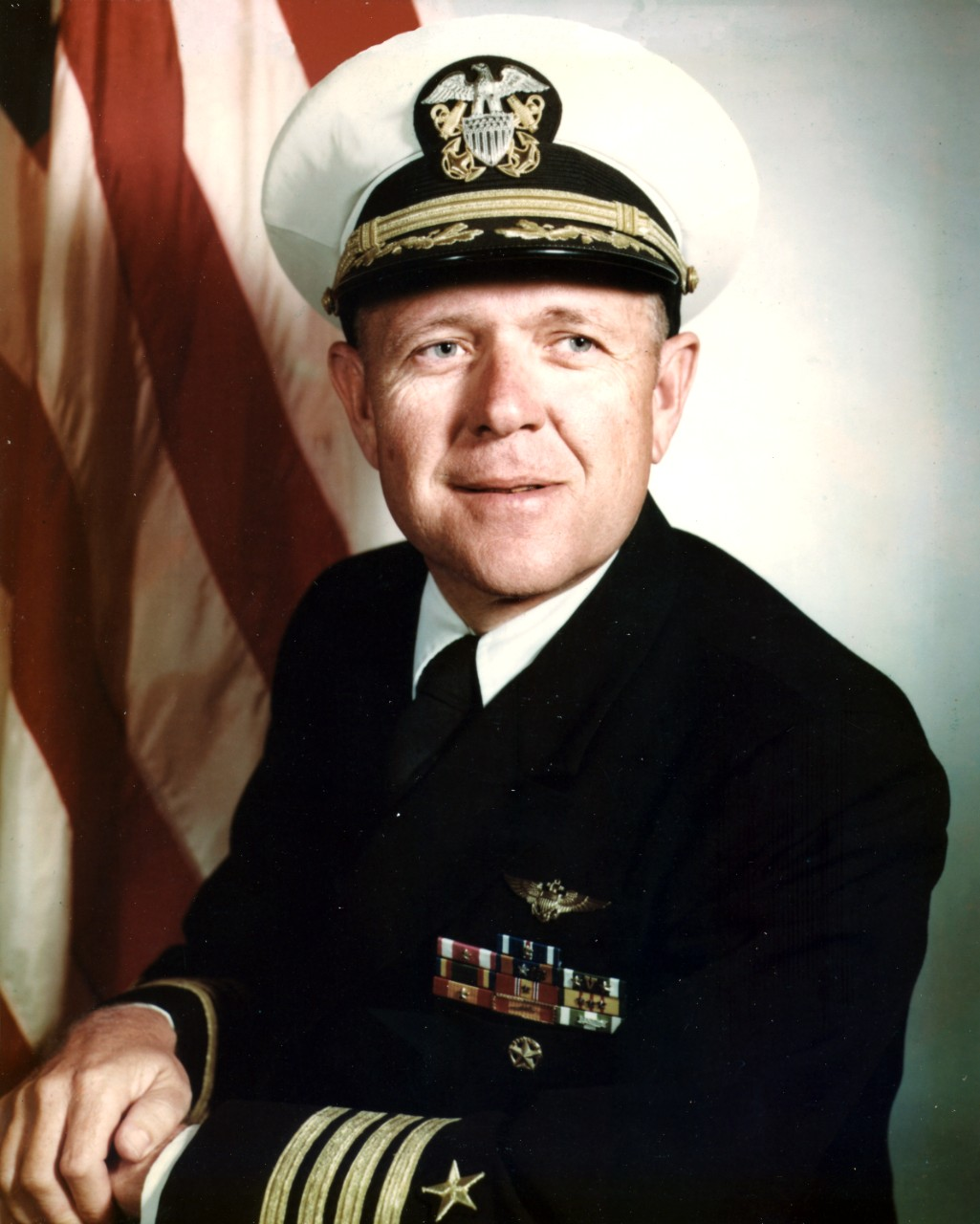
Tuttle as USS John F. Kennedy commander

In Vietnam, Admiral Tuttle was decorated for personal heroism three times, flying 260 missions in the single-seat light attack A-4. He served in VA-44, VA-15, VA-112 and VA-174. He commanded VA-81 and Carrier Air Wing Three. Admiral Tuttle later commanded the aircraft carrier USS John F. Kennedy and became one of the longest-serving carrier battle group commanders in Navy history.

== Leader in Navy Command and Control technology ==
Tuttle led development of the Navy's Joint Operational Tactical System (JOTS) Command and Control System. “JOTS began as a prototyping effort that was first deployed aboard ship in the early 1980s. This system provided the operational commander with the first integrated display of data for decision support purposes. System functionality eventually included track management, track analysis, environment prediction, and a variety of tactical overlays and Tactical Decision Aids (TDAs). JOTS was capable of receiving various data and message input such as Link 11, Link 14, Tactical Data Information Exchange System-A (TADIXS A), Officer in Tactical Command Information Exchange System (OTCIXS), High Interest Track (HIT) Broadcasts, and U.S. Message Text Format (USMTF) messages. JOTS allowed the Fleet Command Centers to interface with command ships and other shore installations. Through the use of a tactical data base manager (TDBM), JOTS provided a consistent tactical battlespace picture for all supporting warfare commanders afloat and ashore.” It was joked that JOTS really stood for the “Jerry O Tuttle's System.” After the first 18 months of Carrier Group Eight's efforts, when finally formalized and using the Joint Naming protocols of the time, “Joint Operational Tactical System” was adopted as a more acceptable alternative.

Tuttle also spearheaded DOD and NATO adoption of “over-the-air rekeying” (OTAR) for communications encryption/decryption keys. This innovation, originated by the Navy European Command, permitted code keys to be securely distributed via electronic communications channels, thereby virtually eliminating necessity of production and distribution of thousands of physical keys. This obviated astronomical logistical and security costs while also closing vast communications espionage vulnerabilities thought, until that time, to be inherently unavoidable.

== Later life ==
Tuttle died on October 30, 2018, in Fairfax, Virginia. He was buried at Arlington National Cemetery.
