= John B. Nichols =

- Born: September 28, 1931
- Died: June 17, 2004 (aged 72)
- Military career
- Allegiance: United States of America
- Branch: United States Navy
- Service years: 1957–1975
- Rank: Commander
- Nickname: Pirate
- Units: Fighter Squadron 174 (VF-174); Fighter Squadron 62 (VF-62); U.S. Navy Fighter Weapons School; Fighter Squadron 191 (VF-191)
- Commands: Fighter Squadron 24 (VF-24)
- Conflicts: Vietnam War
- Awards: Silver Star Medal - Distinguished Flying Cross - Navy Commendation Medal - (16) Air Medals - Navy Unit Commendation - National Defense Service Medal - Vietnam Service Medal - Republic of Vietnam Campaign Medal with V - Navy League Stephen Decator Award

John Bennett Nichols III (September 28, 1931 – June 17, 2004) was a United States Navy aviator and author.

== Biography ==
Raised in Hialeah, Florida, Nichols enlisted in the United States Army in 1950 and served as a combat medic during the Korean War. After attending college he was accepted for NavCad training and commissioned in 1957. Originally he flew the North American FJ-4 Fury and F-9F Panther jets but shortly thereafter made the transition to the more advanced supersonic Vought F-8 Crusader fighter. The F-8 was the last U.S. fighter designed with guns as its primary weapons system. The last Gunfighter. This would be the aircraft that defined his professional career. Nichols, who adopted the call sign 'Pirate' joined Fighter Squadron VF-62 just before the Cuban Missile Crisis in October 1962. Nichols and the pilots of VF-62 flew as fighter escorts for classified RF-8 Crusader reconnaissance flights over Cuba. Nichols and the Navy F-8 fighters flew escort missions to protect the photo aircraft from Cuban Revolutionary Air Defense and Soviet Mig Fighters. After the Missile Crisis the pilots of VF-62 were awarded the Navy Unit Commendation by President John F Kennedy. During the Vietnam War Nichols made three Gulf of Tonkin combat deployments between 1967 and 1973. Flying from the Aircraft carriers USS Ticonderoga CVA-14, USS Oriskany CVA-34 and USS Hancock CVA-19. On his first combat deployment, assigned to Fighter Squadron VF-191, Nichols flew an Iron Hand mission with Lieutenant Commander Michael Estocin, who was shot down and posthumously received the Medal of Honor for actions in April 1967.

 On his following deployment Nichols was flying as fighter escort for an RF-8 photo jet on a reconnaissance mission over the Red River Valley in North Vietnam.

The RF-8 was attacked by two North Vietnamese MiG-17 jet Fighters. Nichols engaged the two Migs in a dogfight giving the RF-8 a chance to escape. During the air battle Nichols shot down the Mig 17 leader and chased the second Mig fighter over the Chinese border. Nichols shoot down of the attacking Mig Fighter saved the life of the Navy reconnaissance pilot. Nichols Mig Kill was the final aerial victory to be won with guns in U.S. Naval history. For Gallantry in action, Nichols was awarded the Silver Star Medal. He later commanded VF-24 during the closing days of the war in 1973. At the end of his naval career, he was one of only five pilots to log over 3,000 hours in the demanding Crusader Fighter. Nichols flew 352 combat missions during the war including over a hundred iron hand missions. After the war Nichols served as a flight and Tactics instructor at Naval Air Station Miramar. In this capacity he was one of the founding pilots of the Naval Fighter Weapons School that became known as 'TOPGUN'. Upon retirement in 1975, Nichols returned to California with his Wife Sheri and wrote occasionally. The first of his two books was a combination memoir and analysis titled On Yankee Station (1987). His second book, Warriors, a novel about an air war in the Middle East, was released shortly before Gulf War, Operation Desert Storm in 1990. Both were written with his friend Barrett Tillman. 'On Yankee Station' was well received in military aviation circles, and was added to the Navy, Air Force and Marine Corps professional reading lists. Nichols returned to Florida and settled in Melbourne with his second wife Jacqueline. There he died from cancer at age 72, survived by his three children, John, Richard, and Sharon, Grand Children, Jared, Hunter and Stephanie, his wife, and two step daughters. Nichols is also survived by two brothers and two sisters.
