= Over the Hills and Far Away (traditional song) =

British traditional song

"Over the Hills and Far Away" (Roud 8460) is a traditional English song, dating back to at least the late 17th century. Two versions were published in the fifth volume of Thomas D'Urfey's Wit and Mirth, or Pills to Purge Melancholy; a version that is similar to the second Wit and Mirth one appears in George Farquhar's 1706 play The Recruiting Officer. A further version appears in John Gay's The Beggar's Opera of 1728. The melody is modal, in what is known as C-Dorian (the Dorian mode transposed to C).

The words have changed over the years, as can be seen in the versions below. The only consistent element in early versions is the title line and the tune. The first Wit and Mirth version and Gay's version both refer to lovers, while the second Wit and Mirth version along with Farquhar's version refer to military service. The tune was provided with another set of lyrics for the British Sharpe television series of the 1990s, based on Farquhar's version. This version was also recorded by John Tams who played Dan Hagman in the series. A version is sung by Philomena Cheer in Episode 7 of season 3 of TURN: Washington's Spies.

The nursery rhyme "Tom, Tom, the Piper's Son" mentions a piper who knows only one tune, this one. Early versions of this, known as "The distracted Jockey's Lamentations", may have been written (but not included) in Thomas D'Urfey's play The Campaigners (1698):

Tommy was a Piper's Son,
And fell in love when he was young;
But all the Tunes that he could play,
Was, o'er the Hills, and far away.

An instrumental version was heard in the Barney & Friends episode "Classical Cleanup".

== Wit and Mirth lyrics ==
=== Jockey's Lamentation ===
Jockey met with Jenny fair
Betwixt the dawning and the Day,
And Jockey now is full of Care,
For Jenny stole his Heart away:
Altho' she promis'd to be true,
Yet she, alas, has prov'd unkind,
That which do make poor Jockey rue,
For Jenny's fickle as the Wind:
And, 'Tis o'er the Hills, and far away,
'Tis o'er the Hills, and far away,
'Tis o'er the Hills, and far away,
The Wind has blown my Plad away.

Jockey was a bonny Lad,
As e'er was born in Scotland fair;
But now poor Jockey is run mad,
For Jenny causes his Despair;
Jockey was a Piper's Son,
And fell in Love while he was young:
But all the Tunes that he could play,
Was, o'er the Hills, and far away,
And, [As for verse one]

When first I saw my Jenny's Face,
She did appear with sike a Grace,
With muckle Joy my Heart was fill'd;
But now alas with Sorrow kill'd.
Oh! was she but as true as fair,
'Twou'd put an end to my Despair;
But ah, alass! this is unkind,
Which sore does terrify my Mind;
'Twas o'er the Hills, and far away,
'Twas o'er the Hills, and far away,
'Twas o'er the Hills, and far away,
That Jenny stole my Heart away.

Did she but feel the dismal Woe
That for her Sake I undergo,
She surely then would grant Relief,
And put an end to all my Grief:
But oh, she is as false as fair,
Which causes all my sad Despair;
She triumphs in a proud Disdain,
And takes Delight to see my Pain;
[As for verse one]

Hard was my Hap to fall in Love,
With one that does so faithless prove;
Hard was my fate to court the Maid,
That has my constant Heart betray'd:
A thousand times to me she swore,
She would be true for evermore:
But oh! alas, with Grief I say,
She's stole my Heart, and ran away;
[As for verse three]

Good gentle Cupid take my part,
And pierce this false one to the Heart,
That she may once but feel the Woe,
As I for her do undergo;
Oh! make her feel this raging Pain,
That for her Love I do sustain;
She sure would then more gentle be,
And soon repent her Cruelty;
[As for verse one]

I now must wander for her sake,
Since that she will no Pity take,
Into the Woods and shady Grove,
And bid adieu to my false Love:
Since she is false whom I adore,
I ne'er will trust a Woman more,
From all their Charms I'll fly away,
And on my Pipe will sweetly play;
[As for verse one]

There by my self I'll sing and say,
'Tis o'er the Hills, and far away,
That my poor Heart is gone astray,
Which makes me grieve both Night and Day;
Farewel, farewel, thou cruel she,
I fear that I shall die for thee:
But if I live, this Vow I'll make,
To love no other for your sake.
[As for verse one]

=== The Recruiting Officer (Or The Merry Volunteers) ===
Hark! now the Drums beat up again,
For all true Soldiers Gentlemen,
Then let us list, and march I say,
Over the Hills and far away;
Chorus
Over the Hills and o'er the Main,
To Flanders, Portugal and Spain,
Queen Ann commands, and we'll obey,
Over the Hills and far away.

All Gentlemen that have a Mind,
To serve the Queen that's good and kind;
Come list and enter into Pay,
Then o'er the Hills and far away;
Chorus

Here's Forty Shillings on the Drum,
For those that Volunteers do come,
With Shirts, and Cloaths, and present Pay,
When o'er the Hills and far away;
Chorus

Hear that brave Boys, and let us go,
Or else we shall be prest you know;
Then list and enter into Pay,
And o'er the Hills and far away,
Chorus

The Constables they search about,
To find such brisk young Fellows out;
Then let's be Volunteers I say,
Over the Hills and far away;
Chorus

Since now the French so low are brought,
And Wealth and Honour's to be got,
Who then behind wou'd sneaking stay?
When o'er the Hills and far away;
Chorus

No more from sound of Drum retreat,
While Marlborough, and Galway beat,
The French and Spaniards every Day,
When over the Hills and far away;
Chorus

He that is forc'd to go and fight,
Will never get true Honour by't,
While Volunteers shall win the Day,
When o'er the Hills and far away;
Chorus

What tho' our Friends our Absence mourn,
We all with Honour shall return;
And then we'll sing both Night and Day,
Over the Hills and far away;
Chorus

The Prentice Tom he may refuse,
To wipe his angry Master's Shoes;
For then he's free to sing and play,
Over the Hills and far away;
Chorus

Over Rivers, Bogs, and Springs,
We all shall live as great as Kings,
And Plunder get both Night and Day,
When over the Hills and far away,
Chorus

We then shall lead more happy Lives,
By getting rid of Brats and Wives,
That Scold on both Night and Day,
When o'er the Hills and far away:
Chorus

Come on then Boys and you shall see,
We every one shall Captains be,
To Whore and rant as well as they,
When o'er the Hills and far away:
Chorus

For if we go 'tis one to Ten,
But we return all Gentlemen,
All Gentlemen as well as they,
When o'er the Hills and far away:
Chorus

== George Farquhar lyrics ==
A version of the lyrics by George Farquhar for his play The Recruiting Officer from 1706:

Our 'prentice Tom may now refuse
To wipe his scoundrel master's shoes,
For now he's free to sing and play
Over the hills and far away.
Chorus
Over the hills and over the main,
To Flanders, Portugal, or Spain;
The king commands and we'll obey,
Over the hills and far away.

We shall lead more happy lives
By getting rid of brats and wives,
That scold and bawl both night and day,
Over the hills and far away.
Chorus

Courage, boys, it's one to ten
But we return all gentlemen;
While conq'ring colours we display,
Over the hills, and far away.
Chorus

== John Gay lyrics ==
In The Beggar's Opera the song is a duet between the antihero Macheath and his lover Polly. It is a romantic dream of escape, with no military references.

MACHEATH:

Were I laid on Greenland's Coast,
And in my Arms embrac'd my Lass;
Warm amidst eternal Frost,
Too soon the Half Year's Night would pass.

POLLY:

Were I sold on Indian Soil,
Soon as the burning Day was clos'd,
I could mock the sultry Toil
When on my Charmer's Breast repos'd.

MACHEATH:

And I would love you all the Day,

POLLY:

Every Night would kiss and play,

MACHEATH:

If with me you'd fondly stray

POLLY:

Over the Hills and far away

== John Tams lyrics ==
This is the version that is used in the Sharpe television series with lyrics written by John Tams. Note that each verse is from a different story, as noted at the start of the verse.

Chorus:

O'er the hills and o'er the main
Through Flanders, Portugal and Spain.
King George commands and we obey
Over the hills and far away.

From Sharpe's Eagle & Sharpe's Mission:

Here's forty shillings on the drum
To those who volunteer to come,
To 'list and fight the foe today
Over the Hills and far away.

From Sharpe's Company:

Through smoke and fire and shot and shell,
And to the very walls of hell,
But we shall stand and we shall stay
Over the hills and far away

From Sharpe's Enemy:

Though I may travel far from Spain
A part of me shall still remain,
And you are with me night and day
and Over the hills and far away.

From Sharpe's Honour & Sharpe's Siege:

Then fall in lads behind the drum
With colours blazing like the sun.
Along the road to come what may
Over the hills and far away.

From Sharpe's Gold:

When Evil stalks upon the land
I'll neither hold nor stay me hand
But fight to win a better day,
Over the hills and far away.

From Sharpe's Battle:

If I should fall to rise no more,
As many comrades did before,
Ask the fifes and drums to play
Over the hills and far away.

From Sharpe's Sword:

Let kings and tyrants come and go,
I'll stand adjudged by what I know.
A soldiers life I'll ne'er gainsay.
Over the hills and far away.

From Sharpe's Challenge:

Though kings and tyrants come and go
A soldier's life is all I know
I'll live to fight another day
Over the hills and far away.

No version of the song accompanies Sharpe's Rifles, Sharpe's Regiment, Sharpe's Revenge and Sharpe's Justice. A tongue-in-cheek verse appears in Sharpe's Waterloo:

Old Wellington, he scratched his bum.
He says, "Boney lad, thee's had thee fun."
My riflemen will win the day
Over the hills and far away.

Dan Hagman quietly sings the first verse to Perkins when he was dying from getting bayoneted by a Spanish-Irish traitor, O'Rourke, in Sharpe's Battle, and Sharpe himself recites the same verse to the dying Ensign Beauclere in Sharpe's Peril.

=== Tams's recorded version ===
Tams recorded a variation of the above lyrics for Over the Hills & Far Away: The Music of Sharpe, the companion CD to the television film series. The song was also recorded by New Zealand singer Will Martin on his debut 2008 album New World. The lyrics for that version go as follows. (Chorus lyrics located at bottom of page)

Here's forty shillings on the drum
For those who volunteer to come,
To 'list and fight the foe today
Over the Hills and far away

[Chorus]

When duty calls me I must go
To stand and face another foe
But part of me will always stray
Over the hills and far away

[Chorus]

If I should fall to rise no more
As many comrades did before
Then ask the fifes and drums to play
Over the hills and far away

[Chorus]

Then fall in lads behind the drum
With colours blazing like the sun
Along the road to come what may
Over the hills and far away

[Chorus] 3x

[Chorus]: O'er the hills and o'er the main

Through Flanders, Portugal and Spain
King George commands and we obey
Over the hills and far away

== See also ==
- Over the Hills & Far Away: The Music of Sharpe
