= Sharpe's Enemy (TV programme) =

- Based on: Sharpe's Enemy by Bernard Cornwell
- Screenplay by: Eoghan Harris
- Directed by: Tom Clegg
- Starring: Sean Bean; Daragh O'Malley; Hugh Fraser; Michael Byrne; Pete Postlethwaite; Assumpta Serna; Elizabeth Hurley
- Theme music composer: Dominic Muldowney; John Tams
- Country of origin: United Kingdom
- Original language: English

Production
- Producers: Malcolm Craddock; Muir Sutherland (exec.)
- Running time: 101 minutes

Original release
- Network: ITV
- Release: 1 June 1994

Related
- Sharpe's Company; Sharpe's Honour

Sharpe's Enemy is a British television drama, the fourth of a series that follows the career of Richard Sharpe, a British soldier during the Napoleonic Wars. This episode is based on the 1984 novel of the same name by Bernard Cornwell.

== Plot ==
In 1813, a band of deserters, British, French, and others, led by Sharpe's nemesis Obadiah Hakeswill and French renegade Pot-au-Feu, takes over a Portuguese village in the mountains. Lady Isabella, the wife of Sir Augustus Farthingdale, the English military envoy to Portugal, is taken captive. The brigands demand a ransom for her and for another lady taken earlier, Sarah, the spouse of French Colonel Dubreton.

Sharpe delivers the money for Lady Isabella, while Dubreton does the same for his wife. When asked how she is faring, Sarah responds with a verse of poetry. Hakeswill, however, reneges on the previous agreement, demanding double the amount asked, and gives each man five days to deliver the second instalment. When Sharpe returns to camp, Wellington, the British commander, decides that drastic action is required to discourage desertion before it can infect his army.

Sharpe also reports seeing a Major Ducos, who accompanied Dubreton. This worries Major Nairn, the head of Wellington's military intelligence. He suspects that Ducos, his French counterpart, is scouting for a route for a French invasion of Portugal. The village is the perfect spot to gain a foothold to allow French forces to pour into Portugal.

Sarah's poem conceals a clue to the captives' whereabouts. Sharpe comes up with a risky plan to rescue the women. When Farthingdale objects by quoting regulations that a major must lead a detachment of this size, Wellington presents him with a letter from the Prince Regent, who has followed Sharpe's exploits since Talavera with admiration, promoting Sharpe to major. Sharpe is given command of the 60th Rifles, with 'Sweet' William Frederickson as his captain.

Sharpe sneaks into the village with Sergeant Harper and his "chosen men" on Christmas Eve, when the enemy is drunk and distracted, and frees the captives with the aid of Kelly (a deserter who had briefly served alongside Sharpe and had grown disaffected with the conduct of the other deserters). While they wait for Captain William Frederickson to bring up his company, it is revealed that Lady Isabella had been a prostitute and a former lover of Sharpe's. While waiting for the morning to bring the reinforcements, they resume their sexual relationship.

As morning breaks, the 60th Rifles arrive and the battle goes almost as planned. The deserters are killed or captured (including Kelly, who Sharpe promotes to "chosen man" as he dies), except for Hakeswill who escapes with a captured Isabella. He runs into Sharpe's wife Teresa, who had been scouting the approaching French force. Hakeswill mortally wounds her, but is caught by Dubreton, who hands him over to Sharpe. Teresa dies in Sharpe's arms, and is buried in the mountains in the village.

Ducos arrives and delivers an ultimatum, demanding the surrender of the village. Sharpe refuses. When Farthingdale tries to negotiate, Sharpe stops him by threatening to reveal Isabella's past to the Lisbon court. The French believe Sharpe only has infantry and attack, outnumbering the British 10 to 1. As the French line walk forward, Sharpe's reveals he has Lancers (cavalry) ready to attack, which force the French infantrymen to change to close formation to defend against side attacks from charges. The Lancers are actually a rocket artillery company who open fire on the now easy to hit group of infantry and destroy them forcing them into a full rout. Hakeswill is executed by firing squad. Sharpe reunites with his daughter by Theresa, Antonia.

== Cast ==
- Sean Bean as Sharpe
- Daragh O'Malley as Harper
- Hugh Fraser as Wellington
- Michael Byrne as Nairn
- Pete Postlethwaite as Hakeswill
- Assumpta Serna as Teresa
- Jeremy Child as Sir Augustus
- Elizabeth Hurley as Lady Farthingdale
- Helena Michell as Sarah Dubreton
- Tony Haygarth as Pot au Feu
- Michael Mears as Cooper
- John Tams as Hagman
- Jason Salkey as Harris
- Lyndon Davies as Perkins
- Philip Whitchurch as Frederickson
- Féodor Atkine as Major Ducos
- François Guétary as Dubreton
- Nicholas Rowe as Gilliand
- Vincent Grass as Chaumier
- Diana Perez as Ramona
- Morgan Jones as Kelly
- Iain Glass as Rossner

== Production notes ==
The programme was filmed in Crimea.

== Soundtrack ==
- "Spanish Ladies"
