= Sharpe's Siege (TV programme) =

- Based on: Sharpe's Siege by Bernard Cornwell
- Written by: Eoghan Harris; Charles Wood (uncredited)
- Directed by: Tom Clegg
- Starring: Sean Bean; Daragh O'Malley; Christian Brendel; Amira Casar; Féodor Atkine; Abigail Cruttenden; Hugh Fraser; James Laurenson
- Theme music composer: Dominic Muldowney; John Tams
- Country of origin: United Kingdom
- Original language: English

Production
- Executive producer: Muir Sutherland
- Producer: Malcolm Craddock
- Editor: Keith Palmer
- Running time: 100 minutes

Original release
- Release: 8 May 1996

Related
- Sharpe's Regiment; Sharpe's Mission

Sharpe's Siege is a British television drama, the tenth episode of a series that follows the career of Richard Sharpe, a British soldier during the Napoleonic Wars. The adaptation is based on the 1987 novel of the same name by Bernard Cornwell.

== Plot summary ==
In 1813, the war turns in favour of the British. Lord Wellington is poised to invade southern France after triumphing in Spain. The Comte de Maquerre, a French nobleman, offers to raise a rebellion in Bordeaux against Napoleon. Wellington's intelligence chief, Major General Ross, is unconvinced, as his spies have reported no discontent in the region, but agrees that a regiment can be sent as a probe if the comte can provide a secure base; he offers his family castle, though he admits that it is held by his sister and garrisoned.

Wellington is forced to put a young, inexperienced Colonel Horace Bampfylde (the son of a general Wellington needs to placate) in charge of the expedition, instead of Major Sharpe. Sharpe is reluctant to go, as he has just married Jane Gibbons and she has come down with a deadly fever. Without quinine, her prognosis is bleak, but Sharpe must follow his orders.

At the castle, Bampfylde splits his forces in two, sending Sharpe away on an unneeded reconnaissance mission as he attacks with his force alone, botching the initial assault, he is driven back with heavy casualties. Disgusted, Sharpe and his men return to see this. They gain entry to the castle at night by a ruse, pretending to be a French patrol bringing in a seriously wounded soldier, and capture the fortress easily. Bampfylde enters the fort, irritated by the ease with which Sharpe won it, sending Sharpe on yet another needless reconnaissance in order to reassert his authority. The comte is reunited with his sister and gravely ill mother.

While Sharpe is away, the comte brings French intelligence officer Major Ducos masquerading as the local mayor, to Bampfylde, telling him that Bordeaux is ripe for rebellion. Bampfylde is easily fooled by the comte, who is working for Napoleon. Ducos tells Bampfylde that Sharpe was ambushed and killed by a French column, but he convinces Bampfylde that his mission has been a success; with the capture of the fort, defeat of the French and the rousing of Bordeaux. Ducos persuades Bampfylde to demolish the front gates, spoil the ammunition magazine, abandon the wounded, and return to Wellington immediately with the good news.

Nearby on his reconnaissance mission, Sharpe's patrol ambushes and annihilates another French column of reinforcements, capturing a resupply cart and a doctor bringing quinine for the comte's mother. After the fight, one of Sharpe's men, Rifleman Robinson, is found with a local French girl. Sharpe moves to hang him per Wellington's standing order, but the girl says she had been willing, thus saving Robinson. Sharpe pays her father to salve his anger, asking him if he is ready to rise against Napoleon. The father is indignant and reveals that Bordeaux is fiercely loyal to Napoleon, revealing to Sharpe that the region is not ripe for rebellion.

Hearing an explosion from the castle, Sharpe and his men hurry back. When he gets a description of the mayor, he realises he has been trapped by Major Ducos. Not only will Wellington be tricked into advancing into an ambush, but Ducos will have his own personal revenge on Sharpe. Knowing survival is slim, and despite the temptation to save it for his wife, Sharpe allows the quinine to be administered to the ailing woman.

French General Calvet arrives with a sizeable, but inexperienced, force. Under a flag of truce, the comte reveals himself to be Napoleon's agent, and offers to let the British go free, provided that they leave Sharpe behind; Robinson replies for them all, "Fight them to the finish, sir." Sharpe turns them down. Hagman shoots the comte dead at long range as he returns from the parley, putting fear into the young French troops of the British skill.

Sharpe and his men only have 18 rounds each due to the destruction of the ammunition. Earlier, out of gratitude for Sharpe providing her mother with quinine, the comte's sister had told them to burn a cellar full of oyster shells to produce lime. The French attack, but are met by the highly accurate volley fire of the riflemen. With the British ammunition running low, Sharpe's men dump powdered lime from the walls, blinding their foes as they funnel through the now open gate of the castle, making them easy targets. The British proceed to massacre the helpless Frenchmen. The beaten French retreat just as the British run out of ammunition. A messenger arrives at Calvet's camp from Marshal Soult, Calvet's superior, demanding to know why he was not guarding the flank when Wellington attacked ... fifty miles away. The wily British commander had been suspicious, so he attacked elsewhere. General Calvet hurries away, leaving Sharpe victorious, and annoyed he was used as a decoy.

When Sharpe gets back, Bampfylde is placed under arrest for cowardice and other charges. Sharpe is astounded to find his wife well; she tells him that Wellington had gone to some lengths to obtain quinine for her, due to his respect for Sharpe.

== Cast ==
- Sean Bean – Sharpe
- Daragh O'Malley – Harper
- Abigail Cruttenden – Jane
- Hugh Fraser – Wellington
- James Laurenson – Ross
- Féodor Atkine – Ducos
- Christian Brendel – Maquerre
- Christopher Villiers – Bampfylde
- Amira Casar – Catherine
- Philip Whitchurch – Frederickson
- James Ryland – Palmer
- Olivier Pierre – Calvet
- Danny Cunningham – Robinson
- Sylvester Morand – Lassan
- John Tams – Hagman
- Jason Salkey – Harris
- John Tordoff – Kenefick
- Jim McManus – Smithers
- J.D. Kelleher – Reilly
- Nicola Murray – Brigitte
- Stéphane Cornicard – French Colonel
- Diana Perez – Ramona
- Peter Weir - Minister
- Nick Mollo - Fytch
- Ercüment Balakoglu - Gaston
- Yeveny Yilmaz - Surgeon
