= Sharpe's Waterloo (TV programme) =

- Written by: Charles Wood; Bernard Cornwell (characters)
- Directed by: Tom Clegg
- Starring: Sean Bean; Daragh O'Malley; Abigail Cruttenden; Hugh Fraser; Cécile Paoli; Oliver Tobias; Paul Bettany; Alexis Denisof; Neil Dickson
- Theme music composer: Dominic Muldowney; John Tams
- Country of origin: United Kingdom
- Original language: English

Production
- Producers: Malcolm Craddock; Muir Sutherland (exec.)
- Editor: Keith Palmer
- Running time: 100 minutes

Original release
- Release: 21 May 1997

Related
- Sharpe's Justice; Sharpe's Challenge

Sharpe's Waterloo is a British television drama, the 14th part of a series that follows the career of Richard Sharpe, a fictional British soldier during the Napoleonic Wars. The adaptation is based on the 1990 novel of the same name by Bernard Cornwell.

== Plot ==
In 1815, war breaks out as Napoleon returns to France from exile on Elba. Richard Sharpe can't resist the chance to finally see him in person and re-enlists, breaking his promise to his partner Lucille to fight no more. Unlike his adulterous wife Jane, she forgives him and accompanies him to the battlefield. He has been given a lieutenant colonel commission on the staff of Prince William of Orange.

Scouting south of Quatre Bras, Sharpe spots French troops. The Dutch cavalry he sends to alert the Allied command are killed by French cuirassiers pursuing Sharpe. Lord Rossendale joins the staff of Lord Uxbridge, Wellington's second-in-command, bringing his lover, Sharpe's estranged wife Jane, with him to Brussels. Polite society refuses to accept Jane but Rossendale learns that Sharpe is also quartered in Brussels. At the Prince of Orange's camp, Sharpe is reunited with his former sergeant major and best friend, Patrick Harper who remains a private citizen, and two of his long-time "chosen men": Hagman and Harris, who he makes both sergeants.

Sharpe scouts the French forces again and alerts the Duke of Wellington at a ball in Brussels that Napoleon is on the move. Sharpe encounters Jane and Rossendale at the ball, and challenges Rossendale in front of the guests. Rossendale refuses to fight and wets himself and Sharpe demands his promise to repay the money Jane stole from Sharpe. They encounter each other again on the battlefield and Rossendale draws a pistol but lacks the courage to fire. Sharpe takes Rossendale's sword and pistol and breaks them then coerces Rossendale into writing a promissory note for Sharpe's money. Rossendale lies to his fellow officers about the destruction of his sword and pistol, but later confesses the truth to lieutenant Witherspoon who tells him the only way to regain his lost honour is to fight like a demon in the coming battle.

During the battle of Waterloo, Lucille prays for Sharpe's safe return and Jane writes in her diary that she is pregnant with Rossendale's bastard child. Sharpe commands the defence of a crucial farmhouse at La Haye Sainte, which is defended by the King's German Legion and the 95th Rifles, saving the life of a King's German Legion officer, Macduff, in the action. Believing that La Haye Sainte has fallen, Prince William (failing to learn from an earlier error) orders an English regiment to reform from square to line and re-capture the farm. French cavalry catch the British in the wrong formation, destroy the unit and capture its colours, while Sharpe watches in disgust. The Prince escapes to the farmhouse for safety. Once again misunderstanding what is happening on the battlefield, the Prince leads a foolish attack from the farmhouse, which causes more huge losses to his side, including being directly responsible for the deaths of Hagman and Harris. Mindful of Prince William's total incompetence which has cost so many lives, Sharpe observes the Prince gallop away, leaving his men to be slaughtered by the French. Sharpe shoots the prince at long range from a secluded spot, and thinks he is mortally wounded. On another part of the battlefield, Rossendale breaks his duck and kills his first man, realising he likes it and can now kill Sharpe, he revels in his newly acquired bloodlust and is killed by French cuirassiers.

Sharpe moves back to Wellington's forces and assumes command of his old unit, the South Essex Regiment, when its commanding officer becomes a casualty. At the climax of the battle, Napoleon sends in his elite Imperial Guard. Sharpe repels this last-ditch assault, much to Wellington's delight. Wellington orders Sharpe to take the men in pursuit of the retreating enemy, saying it's his battalion. Sharpe leads his men forward, both he and Harper glimpse Napoleon ahead of them on a hill, as he concedes and rides off in defeat. The pair are jubilant they both finally got to see 'ole Boney. Satisfied, Harper says a final goodbye to his colonel, as Sharpe urges his men forward to 'see the frogs off.'

== Cast ==
- Sean Bean as Sharpe
- Daragh O'Malley as Harper
- Abigail Cruttenden as Jane
- Hugh Fraser as Wellington
- Cécile Paoli as Lucille
- Paul Bettany as Prince of Orange
- Alexis Denisof as Rossendale
- Neil Dickson as Uxbridge
- Oliver Tobias as Rebecque
- John Tams as Hagman
- Jason Salkey as Harris
- Martin Glyn Murray as Doggett
- Owen Brenman as Witherspoon
- Shaughan Seymour as Ford
- Nicholas Irons as Price
- Martin Cochrane as Macduff
- Jane Merrow as Duchess of Richmond
- Chloe Newsome as Paulette
- Janek Lesniak as Dutch Captain
