= Sharpe's Challenge =

- British DVD cover
- Based on: The Sharpe stories by Bernard Cornwell
- Screenplay by: Russell Lewis
- Directed by: Tom Clegg
- Starring: Sean Bean; Daragh O'Malley; Toby Stephens; Padma Lakshmi; Aurélien Recoing; Lucy Brown
- Theme music composer: Dominic Muldowney; John Tams
- Country of origin: United Kingdom
- Original language: English

Production
- Producers: Malcolm Craddock; Muir Sutherland
- Running time: 135 minutes
- Production companies: Celtic Films Entertainment; Picture Palace Films; BBC America

Original release
- Network: ITV
- Release: 23 April 2006

Related
- Sharpe's Waterloo; Sharpe's Peril

Sharpe's Challenge is a British TV film from 2006 and the 15th episode of the ITV series based on Bernard Cornwell's historical fiction novels about the British soldier Richard Sharpe during the Napoleonic Wars. Contrary to most parts of the TV series, Sharpe's Challenge, as well as the follow-up Sharpe's Peril, is not based entirely on one of Cornwell's novels, but it uses and adapts some characters and storylines from Sharpe's Tiger (1997). Both are set in 1817, two years after Sharpe has retired as a farmer in Normandy, so chronologically they come after Sharpe's Assassin (1815) and before the final novel Sharpe's Devil (1820–21). Some of the events in the film are inspired by events in the first three novels of the series. In Sharpe's Challenge and Sharpe's Peril, Sharpe and his comrade in arms, Patrick Harper, have been temporarily called out of retirement and asked to go to India.

== Plot ==
In 1803 in India, Sergeant Sharpe leads a patrol to an East India Company outpost. He arrives shortly before another group of Company soldiers led by Lieutenant William Dodd. While Sharpe has 'gone for a piss', Dodd's men kill almost the entire garrison and make off with the payroll. Sharpe survives by playing dead, but he witnesses Dodd.

Fourteen years later, in 1817, after his wife Lucille died of fever, Lieutenant Colonel Richard Sharpe, now a farmer in France, is summoned to London by his former commander, the Duke of Wellington, and asked to undertake one more mission for him: to find a man in India. The missing agent was trying to learn the identity of a turncoat officer advising a rebellious Maratha rajah. Sharpe refuses, unwilling to press his luck any further, until he learns that the agent is his old comrade in arms and best friend, Patrick Harper.

Sharpe sets out for India. On his way to report to General Burroughs, he passes a group of soldiers escorting Celia Burroughs, the general's daughter. After a short conversation with her, he rides on ahead. He is soon attacked by marauders, but is rescued by Patrick Harper, who shows up just in time.

Celia Burroughs's escort is also attacked by none other than Dodd; she is captured and taken to the fortress of Khande Rao (Karan Panthaky), the nominal leader of the revolt. However, he is not yet of age and is under the influence of a regent, his late father's favourite concubine, Madhuvanthi, and her lover, now General William Dodd, who plan to kill Rao before he reaches his majority.

Sharpe reaches the encampment of General Burroughs, who is preparing to lay siege to the fortress of Ferraghur. The general is ill, so command has passed to an old, bitter foe of Sharpe's, General Sir Henry Simmerson. Simmerson refuses to act without orders and reinforcements from Agra. However, when Sharpe requests permission to infiltrate the enemy fortress, Simmerson is only too happy to allow him to risk his life, hoping he will die.

Sharpe and Harper pose as deserters and are welcomed by the rebels. Sharpe makes the acquaintance of former French Colonel Gudin and his subordinate Lieutenant Bonnet, fellow veterans of the Battle of Waterloo two years earlier, who have been hired to train the men. Meanwhile, General Burroughs recovers his health, dismisses Simmerson, and commences the siege. Sharpe discovers that Dodd has laid a trap for the British: they will attempt to breach the wall where he has mined it with barrels of gunpowder. In a skirmish, some British soldiers are captured, among them Sergeant Shadrach Bickerstaff, who had clashed with Sharpe earlier. To avoid torture and execution, Bickerstaff betrays Sharpe. Sharpe and Harper are beaten and imprisoned, but Gudin and Bonnet, disgusted by the barbaric execution of prisoners, help Sharpe and Harper escape, just as the British launch their assault. Gudin next attempts to free Celia, but is murdered by Bickerstaff. Sharpe and Harper successfully set off the gunpowder prematurely, resulting in a huge explosion that kills many defenders. Harper encounters and shoots Bickerstaff, while Sharpe goes off in search of Dodd. With the fortress fallen, Dodd prepares to flee. Madhuvanthi attacks him with a knife when she learns that he is abandoning her; he murders her. Sharpe fights and kills Dodd.

Khande Rao is allowed to keep his throne after he signs a peace treaty, much to Sharpe's disgust. Celia is reunited with her father. She tries to persuade Sharpe to stay, but fails. Their mission accomplished, Sharpe and Harper ride off.

== Connections to Cornwell novels ==
Though the screenplay is set some 15 years later, it can be seen as an amalgam of three Cornwell novels – Sharpe's Tiger, Sharpe's Triumph, and Sharpe's Fortress – set in India between 1799 and 1803.

- In Sharpe's Tiger, Sharpe (then a private) infiltrates the fortress of Seringapatam, pretending to be a deserter along with Lieutenant Lawford, instead of Patrick Harper (whom he has not yet met). He is ordered to do so on the initiative of Colonel Wellesley, while in the screenplay, he is persuaded to go to India by the same man (though with a much higher rank). They infiltrate the fortress shortly before it is laid to siege, with the intention of saving Colonel Hector McCandless, head of the East India Company's intelligence service. To test his loyalty, Sharpe is told to shoot McCandless with a musket at point-blank range, which he does, having realised that the powder he is using will not fire. In the screenplay, Sharpe is supposed to shoot Harper, with similar results; in both he knows the gunpowder is fake by the taste (the lack of 'saltiness' from the saltpetre is the clue).
- Colonel Gudin appears in both screenplay and novel as a French officer training Indian soldiers. However, in the novel, he has been sanctioned by Napoleon Bonaparte's government to aid the sultan of Mysore in fighting off the British. In the novel, as in the film, he appears honourable, often opposing the Sultan's wishes to kill prisoners.
- The role of Sergeant Shadrach Bickerstaff in the screenplay is taken from that of Sergeant Obadiah Hakeswill in the novels. In Sharpe's Tiger, Private Sharpe is the target of Hakeswill's bullying. The scene early on in the screenplay where Sharpe provokes Bickerstaff to fight him mimics a scene at the start of the book in which Hakeswill goads Sharpe into striking him, engineering a punishment of 2,000 lashes for Sharpe, and leading up to the events of the rest of the book. Bickerstaff appears to be a character who dies before the events of Sharpe's Tiger, and whose widow is Sharpe's love interest. The plotline in the screenplay where Bickerstaff effectively deserts to the enemy and becomes Dodd's right-hand man is reminiscent of Hakeswill's actions in Sharpe's Fortress.
- The use of "jettis" (Indian strongmen) is borrowed from the novels, where they carry out similar acts of violence on the command of the sultan, such as the execution by pounding nails into prisoners' heads using only their bare hands, as depicted in the screenplay.
- The character of William Dodd is described in Sharpe's Triumph and Sharpe's Fortress. Dodd's introduction to Sharpe and his death at Sharpe's hands in the screenplay are reminiscent of those in the two respective novels.
- In the novels, Gudin does not die, but is captured by the British after helping Sharpe.
- In the novels, Lucille does not die of fever, appearing in Sharpe's last book of the serie, Sharpe's Devil, set in 1820. Furthermore, in the second book of the Starbuck Chronicles, another Bernard Cornwell series set during the American Civil War, Patrick Lassan son of Lucille and Sharpe appears as a secondary character and explains that Lucille is still alive as of 1861, but is feeling lonely, implying probably the death of Sharpe due to natural causes. Patrick carries his father's Pattern 1796 heavy cavalry sword.

== Historical errors ==
Simmerson is first shown having ordered the flogging of a sepoy. Flogging was not a punishment meted out in the armies of the East India Company; only King's soldiers were flogged. However, flogging is in character for Simmerson. Including a flogging as Sharpe meets him here is a callback to their first meeting (in Sharpe's Eagle, both book and screenplay), where Simmerson is having men flogged for the crimes of others, and it serves the purpose of marking Simmerson out as antithetical to Sharpe, who was himself unjustly flogged as a Private.

== Cast ==
- Sean Bean – Sharpe
- Daragh O'Malley – Harper
- Toby Stephens – Major Dodd
- Padma Lakshmi – Madhuvanthi
- Aurélien Recoing – Gudin
- Lucy Brown – Celia Burroughs
- Michael Cochrane – General Sir Henry Simmerson
- Alyy Khan – Mohan Singh
- Hugh Fraser – Duke of Wellington
- Peter-Hugo Daly – Sergeant Shadrach Bickerstaff
- Graham McTavish – McCrae
- Thierry Hancisse – Bonnet
- Karan Panthaky – Khande Rao
- Nicholas Blane – Crosby
- Michael Elwyn – Rawlinson
- Diana Perez – Ramona Harper
- Peter Symonds – Burroughs
- Oliver Chris – Leonard
- Lex Shrapnel – Lawrence

== Reception ==
DVDTalk.com gave the series 3.5 out 5 stars, in its 2006 review of the DVD, and also 3.5 out of 5 in its 2010 review of the Bluray.
