= Sharpe's Regiment (TV programme) =

- Based on: Sharpe's Regiment by Bernard Cornwell
- Screenplay by: Charles Wood
- Directed by: Tom Clegg
- Starring: Sean Bean; Daragh O'Malley; Abigail Cruttenden
- Theme music composer: Dominic Muldowney; John Tams
- Country of origin: United Kingdom
- Original language: English

Production
- Producers: Malcolm Craddock; Muir Sutherland (exec.)
- Editor: Keith Palmer
- Running time: 101 minutes

Original release
- Network: ITV
- Release: 1 May 1996

Related
- Sharpe's Sword; Sharpe's Siege

Sharpe's Regiment is a British television drama, the ninth episode of a series that follows the career of Richard Sharpe, a British soldier during the Napoleonic Wars. This episode is based on the 1986 novel of the same name by Bernard Cornwell.

== Plot ==
It is 1813. The First Battalion of the South Essex Regiment has suffered terrible losses in the fighting in Spain and the entire regiment is in danger of being disbanded as a result. Major Sharpe and Sergeant Major Harper are sent back to England to find out why replacements have not been sent. Sharpe is told that the Second Battalion of the South Essex is drawing pay for over 700 soldiers, but when he arrives at the Second Battalion's barracks, he finds only eleven men, even though there is regular recruiting for the regiment. Sharpe is determined to find the truth.

During an audience with the eccentric and naive Prince Regent, Sharpe is introduced to Lord Fenner, the Secretary of State for War and the man responsible for the regiment's troubles. Fenner insists that the Second Battalion exists only on paper as a means of paying troops who have been scattered for various reasons until they can be placed into a proper unit. Fenner sends Lady Anne Camoynes to sleep with Sharpe and ascertain his intentions. Sharpe reveals he knows Fenner lied, and he intends to find the men who have been recruited. When Fenner finds out, he sends assassins to kill Sharpe, but they fail. Sharpe and Harper kill them instead. Their bodies are tossed into a river, and Sharpe sees to it that rumours are spread that it was he and Harper who have been killed.

Meanwhile, the two men "enlist" in the Second Battalion under pseudonyms to find out what happens to the recruits. They are being trained under secret by the brutal and effete Lieutenant Colonel Girdwood and his vicious underling Sergeant Lynch, to be auctioned off to other regiments by Sharpe's old enemy, Sir Henry Simmerson, with Fenner getting a kickback. Simmerson's niece helps Sharpe and Harper escape.

Sharpe goes to Horse Guards to see the Commander-in-Chief of the Army, the Duke of York, but learns that the Duke is not in London. Sharpe sees his old friend, Sir William Lawford, in whom he confides. Lawford, seeking to avoid scandal for all and on his own initiative, approaches Fenner and proposes a solution—the South Essex gets its men and Sharpe is given command of a rifle battalion in the American war and sent to North America. Lady Camoynes overhears and contacts Sharpe. She tells him that he needs proof of the sales and tells him that she wants to ruin Fenner, who gets sexual favours from her as a way of paying off the debts of her late husband, whom Fenner ruined.

Sharpe and Harper return to Girdwood's training camp on Foulness Island and take over, placing Girdwood under arrest, but they are unable to find any evidence documenting the sales. Sharpe instructs Harper to complete the necessary correct paperwork, officially making the recruits part of the South Essex.

Girdwood escapes and goes to Simmerson's estate, where he collects the incriminating paperwork, and then heads to Simmerson's London house. Sharpe arrives at Simmerson's house too late to stop Girdwood, but he sees an invitation to a party hosted by the Prince Regent. Sharpe also learns from Jane that Simmerson regularly beats her (her father was a lowly saddler), and Sharpe rashly proposes marriage as a way of enabling her to escape Simmerson's abuse. Jane agrees to try to steal the paperwork from Simmerson's house. Sharpe forms up the recruits of the Second Battalion and takes them to London, where they march in on the Prince Regent's party, with Sharpe bearing the eagle he took at Talavera. The Prince gleefully claims them as his own, making the regiment the Prince of Wales' Own Volunteers, instead of the South Essex.

Sharpe is brought in front of Lord Fenner and General Maxwell at a tribunal, where he raises the charges against Fenner and co, but without proof to back his claims, undoing his work. Simmerson had given the paperwork to Fenner, who had ordered it burnt. Just in time to save Sharpe from being sent to Australia, Lady Camoynes shows up with ledgers—which she saved from the fire—detailing the crimes and uses them for blackmail for herself and for Sharpe. Simmerson, due to his influential friends, once more escapes prosecution. To shelter Jane from Simmerson's wrath, Sharpe becomes engaged to her.

Thanks to Lady Camoyne's blackmail of Fenner, Sharpe makes several requests, primary amongst them he gets the men he came for and goes back to fight in Spain, saving the regiment from being deleted from the army list. The regiment is now under the command of Colonel Girdwood, which Sharpe also specifically requested. In Spain, Girdwood has a close encounter with a French artillery round during an attack on the French border and suffers a mental breakdown as a result. Attempting to desert during the battle, Lynch is killed by vengeful British troops. Girdwood is invalided home, and Sharpe takes command of the Prince of Wales' Own Volunteers, leading them on to victory.

== Cast ==
- Sean Bean as Sharpe
- Daragh O'Malley as Harper
- Abigail Cruttenden as Jane Gibbons
- Michael Cochrane as Sir Henry Simmerson
- Nicholas Farrell as Lord Fenner
- Caroline Langrishe as Lady Anne Camonynes
- James Laurenson as Major General Ross
- Mark Lambert as Colonel Girdwood
- Julian Fellowes as The Prince Regent
- Norman Rossington as Horatio Havercamp
- John Tams as Hagman
- Jason Salkey as Harris
- Steve Chambers as Charlie Weller
- Henry Woolley as Marriott
- Robert Patterson as Sergeant Lynch
- Julie T. Wallace as Maggie
- Benedict Taylor as Lawford
- Tristam Wymark as Captain Smith
- Adam James as Captain Carline
- Alexander Armstrong as Rossendale
- Peter Jonfield as Sergeant Carew
- Simon Smith as Corporal
- John Savident as Sir Barstan Maxwell
- Diana Payan as Mrs Grey
- David Battley as Doctor

== Soundtrack ==
- "The Bold Fusilier" (aka "Marching through Rochester")
