= Sharpe's Peril =

2008 British television film

- British DVD cover
- Based on: The Sharpe stories by Bernard Cornwell
- Screenplay by: Russell Lewis
- Directed by: Tom Clegg
- Starring: Sean Bean; Velibor Topic; Daragh O'Malley; Michael Cochrane; Raza Jaffrey; Beatrice Rosen; Rajesh Khattar
- Theme music composer: Dominic Muldowney; John Tams
- Country of origin: United Kingdom
- Original language: English
- No. of episodes: 2

Production
- Producers: Stuart Sutherland; Malcolm Craddock; Muir Sutherland; Paul Frift
- Running time: 138 minutes (2 × 90 minutes minus adverts)

Original release
- Network: ITV
- Release: 2 November 2008

Related
- Sharpe's Challenge

Sharpe's Peril is a 2008 British TV film, and the 16th and final episode of the ITV series based on Bernard Cornwell's historical fiction novels about the English soldier Richard Sharpe during the Napoleonic Wars. Unlike most parts of the TV series, Sharpe's Peril and the preceding Sharpe's Challenge are not based on Cornwell's novels. Both are set in 1817, two years after Sharpe has retired as a farmer in Normandy, so chronologically they come after Sharpe's Assassin (1815) and before Sharpe's Devil (1820–1821). In Sharpe's Challenge and Sharpe's Peril, Sharpe and his comrade-in-arms, Patrick Harper, are called out of retirement and asked to go to India.

== Plot ==
After the events of Sharpe's Challenge, Richard Sharpe and Patrick Harper reluctantly agree to escort Marie-Angelique Bonnet to the hill fort of Kalimgong, where her fiancé, Major Joubert, is stationed. They encounter a baggage train heading to Madras, made up of soldiers from the King's and the East India Company's armies, commanded by the young Ensign Beauclere, engineer Major Tredinnick, and Subedar Pillai. Included in the train is a redcoat prisoner named Barabbas, an Indian princess and her retinue, and Tredinnick's pregnant wife. The train is attacked by forces of the bandit Chitu, the Subedar is wounded, and they are saved by the timely arrival of Colonel Dragomirov's cavalry squadron.

With no one more qualified, Sharpe is forced to take command. He discovers Barabbas is the son of Obadiah Hakeswill, the man who murdered Sharpe's first wife. Harper stops the enraged Sharpe from killing Barabbas on the spot. Colour-Sergeant Wormwood dislikes Sharpe's methods and fosters feelings of resentment among his men, worsened when Sharpe punishes two of Wormwood's men for drunkenness and attempted rape.

Sharpe and Harper find the entire garrison at Kalimgong has been killed, with the exception of the fort's commander, General Sir Henry Simmerson, Sharpe's old enemy. Staked to the ground, naked in the courtyard, Simmerson's mind is addled with the heat, and he seems to only speak nonsense, such as "save the harvest." Major Joubert is not among the dead, to Marie-Angelique's relief, but neither are the Company ledgers that reveal what has been stolen from the fort. The Subedar dies.

Continuing on, the train finds a farming village destroyed by bandits, the entire harvest stolen, and everyone dead but a young girl who witnessed the attack. Between what the girl saw and Simmerson's addled ramblings, Sharpe realises aside from growing opium for the company, Dragomirov and Joubert are responsible for the slaughter in the village and at Kalimgong, using bandits as scapegoats.

While crossing a river, they are attacked by Dragomirov and his men. Joubert grabs Marie-Angelique and rides off with her. Wormwood attacks Sharpe to prevent his pursuit, and wounds him in the shoulder. Harper drags Sharpe to safety as Dragomirov's troops retreat. Sharpe leaves to rescue Marie-Angelique on horseback. When Sharpe finds Joubert, they fight. The weakened Sharpe is disarmed, but Marie-Angelique shoots and kills Joubert with his own pistol. Dragomirov's cavalry find them and take them to their field headquarters on the Indian plains, while the seriously wounded Tredinnick sneaks away in the night to ambush Dragomirov. His shot misses, and Dragomirov stabs him and leaves him for dead. Lance Naik Singh finds Tredinnick and hears his dying words: Dragomirov's lie that Sharpe is dead.

Dragomirov shows Sharpe around his headquarters, where Indian slaves produce opium. He offers Sharpe Joubert's position and promises to keep Sharpe's people prisoner rather than kill them, but Sharpe turns him down. Later, Dragomirov threatens to give Marie-Angelique to his men, so Sharpe agrees to lead Dragomirov to the train and convince Harper to surrender. During the night, Dragomirov has Sharpe chained in a pit with cobras, but he gets free, rescues Marie-Angelique, and rejoins the train. Dragomirov follows, but Sharpe uses gunpowder to create a roadblock.

When the train comes to a village, Mrs Tredinnick goes into labour. Sharpe has no choice but to stop and defend the place. He gets the village's leader, the real Chitu and the rest of the residents on-side for the upcoming battle. Singh repairs a very old cannon. Wormwood wants to desert, but his two cronies decide to fight alongside Sharpe. That night, Sharpe apologises to Barabbas for his earlier treatment and agrees to let him fight, but later, Wormwood frees Barabbas and tells him that Sharpe plans to execute him in the morning. Both Barabbas and Wormwood ride away separately. Wormwood tells Dragomirov about Sharpe's defences.

Dragomirov attacks the next day. Beauclere is fatally wounded while defending the women. Harper kills Wormwood in a hand-to-hand fight. At the last moment, British Indian cavalry arrive, led by Barabbass. Sharpe duels Dragomirov and kills him.

After the battle, Sharpe says goodbye to Marie-Angelique and Simmerson, with whom he manages to make amends, before he and Harper ride off for home.

== Cast ==
- Sean Bean - Colonel Richard Sharpe
- Velibor Topić - Col. Count Vladimir Dragomirov
- Daragh O'Malley - Sergeant Major Patrick Harper
- Beatrice Rosen - Marie-Angelique Bonnet
- Raza Jaffrey - Lance Naik Singh
- Steve Speirs - Colour Sergeant Silas Wormwood
- Nandana Sen - Maharani Padmini
- Chucky Venice - Private Daniel Deever
- Michael Cochrane - Sir Henry Simmerson
- Caroline Carver - Mrs Tredinnick
- Pascal Langdale - Major Philippe Joubert
- Rajesh Khattar - Subedar Pillai
- Jonathan Moore - Reverend Watkin
- David Robb - Major Tredinnick
- Luke Ward-Wilkinson - Ensign the Hon. Percival Beauclere
- Amit Behl - Corporal Barabbas Hakeswill
- Ryan Pope - Private Joshua Quilter
- Jonny Coyne - Private Croop
- Ulhas Tayad - Chitu
- Payal Ghosh - Padme
- Himani Malhotra - Dhara
- Freyanshi Manoj Punamiya - Little Girl
- David Henry - Viscount Sedgefield

== Production history ==
At a book signing in Bath on 11 October 2006, Bernard Cornwell revealed that there were plans by ITV to film two more episodes. When asked about the stories, Cornwell said that he believed that they were producing two new stories specially for television. Filming of Sharpe's Peril, produced by Celtic Film/Picture Palace/Duke Street Films, began on 3 March 2008 in India (in Orchha and Khajuraho), and finished in late April. The film was created both as a 2 x 90 minute version (circa 2 x 69 minutes without adverts, i.e. 138 minutes in total) and a single 100 minute version.

== UK broadcast history ==
Part one was first aired on ITV (ITV1 and UTV) on 2 November 2008 and part two on 9 November 2008, although STV, the holders of the Northern and Central Scottish licensees of ITV, decided not to screen Sharpe's Peril, but instead use the time slots for its own drama Missing from 2006.

Sharpe's Peril was released on DVD on 10 November 2008 in the UK. This 2 disc set comes with both versions of Sharpe's Peril. There has also been a making-of documentary produced for Sharpe's Peril, which is included on the DVD, and was shown on ITV3 after the main show had finished on 9 November.

== Reception ==
DVDTalk.com gave it 4 out of 5 stars, calling it "a dramatic improvement over its predecessor, Sharpe's Challenge (2006)."
