= Sharpe's Rifles (TV programme) =

- Written by: Eoghan Harris
- Directed by: Tom Clegg
- Starring: Sean Bean; Brian Cox; Daragh O'Malley; Assumpta Serna; David Troughton
- Theme music composer: Dominic Muldowney; John Tams
- Country of origin: United Kingdom
- Original language: English

Production
- Running time: 100 minutes

Original release
- Network: ITV
- Release: 5 May 1993

Related
- Sharpe's Eagle

Sharpe's Rifles is the first of the Sharpe television dramas, based on Bernard Cornwell's 1988 novel of the same name. Shown on ITV in 1993, the adaptation stars Sean Bean, Daragh O'Malley and Assumpta Serna. It began a long series of successful and critically acclaimed television adaptations of the novels.

The drama tells the story of Richard Sharpe, an ambitious and hardened soldier from Yorkshire. The story follows the exploits of Sharpe and his band of chosen men through Spain after they survive an ambush by French cavalry.

Filming took place in the Crimea, Portugal and England, during which Paul McGann, the original actor cast for the role of Richard Sharpe, broke his leg and was quickly replaced with Sean Bean.

== Plot summary ==
In 1809, Sergeant Richard Sharpe of the 95th Rifles saves Sir Arthur Wellesley, the commander of the British army fighting the French in Portugal, from three French cavalrymen. Wellesley instantly rewards Sharpe with a field commission to lieutenant.

Later at HQ, Wellesley and Major Michael Hogan, Wellesley's chief of military intelligence, give Sharpe an assignment. Wellesley has no money to pay his men, so he has arranged for a loan from the Rothschild family. James Rothschild has set out from Vienna with a badly needed banker's draft, but has gone missing in the Spanish mountains. While Hogan will be sent first to ascertain Rothschild's whereabouts, a company of the 95th, under Major Dunnett, is being sent to search for him, and Sharpe's first assignment is to command the Chosen Men, a handful of sharpshooters attached to the company. Sharpe, still uncomfortable in his new rank, does not make a good first impression on his men, particularly their unofficial leader, Irishman Patrick Harper.

While Sharpe and his men are out scouting the terrain, the company is surprised and wiped out by enemy cavalry led by Colonel de L'Eclin and a man in dark civilian clothes, with only the young Rifleman Perkins and a gravely wounded Captain Murray, the company's executive officer, surviving. Sharpe's men and the survivors hide in a barn, where Murray, before dying, gives Sharpe his sword and advises him to get Harper on his side.

Harper tells Sharpe that he and the men have decided to return to the army, against orders. To assert his authority, Sharpe engages Harper in a brutal fistfight, but they are interrupted by a band of Spanish guerrillas led by Commandante Teresa Moreno and Major Blas Vivar. Sharpe declares Harper a mutineer and joins forces with the Spanish guerrillas for mutual protection, since they are headed in the same general direction. During the journey, Sharpe begins to bond with his men and also with Teresa. The guerrillas are protecting a chest; when Harper kills two French cavalrymen to save it, Sharpe drops the mutiny charge. Along the way, they encounter the Parkers, a Methodist missionary couple and their niece, whom they take under their protection.

Vivar at first claimed the chest contained important government documents, but after a savage fight where both groups defend themselves against the French, and after a reunion with Major Hogan, Vivar admits it really contains the Gonfalon/Banner of Blood of Santiago. Legend has it that Santiago (Saint James) himself will appear to defend Spain when the flag is raised over the chapel in the town of Torrecastro. Sharpe refuses to assist in this new mission, dismissing the legend as superstition and denigrating the banner as a 'rag on a pole', but Hogan chastises Sharpe, pointing out he fights for a rag on a pole and commands him to assist Vivar with his mission. Hogan points out raising the flag will raise all of Spain. On the eve of the attack, Sharpe promotes Harper to sergeant.

Sharpe, Teresa, Vivar and their men attack and defeat the French garrison. Vivar crosses swords with the man in black, who turns out to be his own brother, and kills him. He then raises the flag. At the end of the battle, Colonel de L'Eclin is about to shoot an unarmed Sharpe, but is shot and killed by Perkins. Sharpe rewards him by making him a Chosen Man, though Hogan advises Perkins to decline the favour.

Sharpe reports back to Wellesley. When the general expresses his disappointment that Sharpe did not find Rothschild, Sharpe reveals that "Mrs Parker" is the banker in disguise, who presents the loan draft to Wellesley's delight. Afterwards, Sharpe and Teresa make love, before she leaves to continue fighting the French.

== Cast ==
Main cast

- Sean Bean as Sharpe
- Brian Cox as Hogan
- Daragh O'Malley as Harper
- Assumpta Serna as Teresa
- David Troughton as Wellesley

Supporting cast

- Simón Andreu as Vivar
- Michael Mears as Cooper
- John Tams as Hagman
- Jason Salkey as Harris
- Paul Trussell as Tongue
- Lyndon Davies as Perkins
- Julian Fellowes as Major Dunnett
- Tim Bentinck as Captain Murray
- Richard Ireson as Sgt Williams
- Martin Jacobs as Lawford
- Malcolm Jamieson as Colonel de l'Eclin
- Anthony Hyde as Man in Black
- Jack McKenzie as Mr Parker
- Kerry Shale as James Rothschild
- Karen Tungay as Louisa

== See also ==
- 95th Regiment of Foot
- Over the Hills and Far Away (traditional song)
- Sharpe's Rifles (novel)
- Sharpe (TV series)
