= Sharpe's Company (TV programme) =

- Based on: Sharpe's Company by Bernard Cornwell
- Screenplay by: Charles Wood
- Directed by: Tom Clegg
- Starring: Sean Bean; Daragh O'Malley; Hugh Fraser; Michael Byrne; Pete Postlethwaite; Assumpta Serna
- Theme music composer: Dominic Muldowney; John Tams
- Country of origin: United Kingdom
- Original language: English

Production
- Producers: Malcolm Craddock; Muir Sutherland (exec.)
- Running time: 102 minutes

Original release
- Network: ITV
- Release: 25 May 1994

Related
- Sharpe's Eagle; Sharpe's Enemy

Sharpe's Company is a British television drama, the third of a series that follows the career of Richard Sharpe, a British soldier during the Napoleonic Wars. This episode is based on the 1982 novel of the same name by Bernard Cornwell.

== Plot ==
It is 1812. General Wellesley is ready to invade Spain from Portugal but two formidable fortresses stand in the way. Ciudad Rodrigo is taken, but Colonel Lawford is severely wounded and forced to relinquish command of the South Essex Regiment, depriving Captain Sharpe of an influential friend.

Colonel Windham, the new commander, brings his own officers, so Sharpe is demoted to lieutenant and is humiliated by being put in charge of the baggage and losing command of his "chosen men" to an aristocratic officer who purchased the commission of the South Essex's Light Company. Worse, one of the reinforcements is Sergeant Obadiah Hakeswill, an old enemy from Sharpe's days in India.

Meanwhile, Sharpe's lover, Teresa, tells him that he has a baby daughter living with her family in Badajoz, the second fortress town. Not knowing who she is, Hakeswill tries to rape her, but proves no match for her. Teresa then slips into Badajoz to spy on the French and to see her baby.

To cause trouble for Sharpe, Hakeswill steals from the officers and plants a picture frame belonging to Windham in the kit of Sharpe's right-hand man, Sergeant Harper. When it is found, the colonel has Harper flogged. Later, during a night skirmish, a turncoat French soldier escapes the besieged town, bearing a dispatch for Wellington and a letter from Teresa; he is shot and killed. Sharpe recovers the letter, which contains a map showing where she is staying, but on his way back Hakeswill tries to shoot Sharpe in the confusion, but he kills a young ensign instead.

Eventually the walls of Badajoz are breached, but the first assault falters. Sharpe rallies the men and leads them into the town. Hakeswill gets to Teresa first due to the letter he stole from Sharpe. Harry Price, one of Sharpe's officers, intervenes and is shot by Hakeswill while trying to protect Teresa. Sharpe is not far behind and stops Hakeswill, who is wounded in the process, but Hakeswill still manages to get away. Hakeswill then rapes and murders the widow of one of the company's soldiers, before retrieving his cache of stolen goods and deserting.

For his bravery and because many of the other officers have been killed, Sharpe is promoted back to captain and regains command of his Light Company. Harper is exonerated when he finds the missing portrait of Windham's wife hidden in Hakeswill's shako and returns it to the colonel.

== Cast ==
- Sean Bean as Sharpe
- Daragh O'Malley as Harper
- Hugh Fraser as Wellington
- Michael Byrne as Nairn
- Pete Postlethwaite as Hakeswill
- Assumpta Serna as Teresa
- Clive Francis as Windham
- Nicholas Jones as Fletcher
- Michael Mears as Cooper
- John Tams as Hagman
- Jason Salkey as Harris
- Lyndon Davies as Perkins
- Scott Cleverdon as Price
- Robert Morgan as Collett
- Louise Germaine as Sally Clayton
- Soo Drouet as Mrs Grimes
- William Mannering as Matthews
- Marc Warren as Captain Rymer
- Peter Gunn as Clayton
- Peter Birrel as Don Moreno
- Tat Whalley as Hope
- Jérôme Pradon as Reynier
