= Sharpe's Mission =

1996 British television film

- Based on: Sharpe by Bernard Cornwell
- Screenplay by: Eoghan Harris
- Directed by: Tom Clegg
- Starring: Sean Bean; Daragh O'Malley; Abigail Cruttenden; James Laurenson; Hugh Fraser; Mark Strong
- Theme music composer: Dominic Muldowney; John Tams
- Country of origin: United Kingdom
- Original language: English

Production
- Editor: Keith Palmer
- Running time: 100 minutes

Original release
- Network: ITV
- Release: 15 May 1996

Related
- Sharpe's Siege; Sharpe's Revenge

Sharpe's Mission is a British television drama, the 11th episode of a series that follows the career of Richard Sharpe, a British soldier during the Napoleonic Wars. Unlike most of the other installments of the series, this episode was not based on a novel by Bernard Cornwell.

== Plot summary ==
In 1810, Major Brand, a British officer serving with Richard Sharpe, is seen by his men to risk his life under extreme French fire to rescue a stranded soldier, the reality however, is that it is a ruse. The French are not trying to kill Brand, and he kills his own man, under the stare of his French counterpart. He then returns to his own men with the dead body, now a hero.

In present day-1813, where France is losing the war. Major Sharpe is teamed with Brand, now a Colonel renowned for leading a small band of soldiers operating far behind enemy lines. Brand brings intelligence about General Calvet's main ammunition magazine. Wellington assigns them the task of blowing up the magazine. To do this, they need the expertise of explosives expert Major Septimus Pyecroft. Major General Ross, Wellington's head of military intelligence, will accompany them to evaluate Calvet's intentions.

Meanwhile, a Gypsy family stumbles upon a secret meeting between French colonel Cresson and a masked Colonel Brand, with one of his men. The interrupted plotters pursue and kill the Gypsies, except for a young woman, Zara, who manages to hide. Afterwards, she starts to bury her dead parents, only to flee when another masked man appears. However, it turns out to be Pyecroft, whose face was disfigured by a bomb accident. He digs the graves and takes Zara under his protection.

In the British encampment, Zara spots one of her family's horses and tells Pyecroft that the murderers spoke English; the next day, three gypsies, with whom Zara was to have stayed, are found garroted. Sharpe's suspicions are aroused by the unexplained deaths and Brand's assumption that 'Pyecroft's gypsy' was among them. At this point, rifleman Harris is prime suspect and assigned to Sharpe's household while awaiting trial.

As their joint mission unfolds, Sharpe realises that Brand is a traitor and French spy, luring them in, in order to trap Ross for his knowledge of Wellington's plans.

Forewarned, Sharpe is able to turn the tables on the turncoat. After Sharpe's men capture the fort where the gunpowder is stored, he has Ross convene a court-martial, in which Brand is convicted and sentenced to death. Brand berates Sharpe and tells him that soon he will need him. As Colonel Cresson retakes the fort. Brand goads Sharpe enough to provoke a sharp push, Brand, sitting on the lip of a well falls into it and dies. The British blow up the magazine and escape, while Brand's men are given the opportunity to redeem themselves by acting as a rear guard to hold off the attacking French forces.

The men return to HQ, for Sharpe to reunite with his wife, who has been flirting with fop and seducer, journalist Shellington. Attracted by his more civilised etiquette and poetry. Harris, acting as manservant is able to prevent any hanky panky. Pyecroft and Zara become engaged. Sharpe leads his chosen men out into the field, and takes one last look back.

== Cast ==
- Sean Bean – Sharpe
- Daragh O'Malley – Harper
- Abigail Cruttenden – Jane
- James Laurenson – Ross
- Hugh Fraser – Wellington
- Mark Strong – Brand
- Andrew Schofield – Pope
- Nigel Betts – Pyecroft
- Warren Saire – Shellington
- John Tams – Hagman
- Jason Salkey – Harris
- Diana Perez – Ramona
- Peter Le Campion – Cresson
- Olivier Pierre – Calvet
- Christian Rodska – Crake
- Berrin Politi – Zara
- Michael Mallinson – Provost Marshal
- Aysun Metiner – Conchita
- Ercüment Balakoglu - Gaston
