= Sharpe (TV series) =

British television historical drama series (1993–2008)

- Series DVD artwork featuring Sean Bean as Richard Sharpe
- Based on: Sharpe by Bernard Cornwell
- Written by: Eoghan Harris; Russell Lewis; Colin MacDonald; Charles Wood
- Directed by: Tom Clegg
- Starring: Sean Bean; Daragh O'Malley
- Theme music composer: Dominic Muldowney; John Tams
- Country of origin: United Kingdom
- Original language: English
- No. of episodes: 16

Production
- Running time: 100 minutes; 140 minutes (Sharpe's Challenge)

Original release
- Network: ITV
- Release: 5 May 1993 – 9 November 2008

Sharpe is a British television drama series starring Sean Bean as Richard Sharpe, a fictional British soldier in the Napoleonic Wars, with Daragh O'Malley playing his trusted companion, Patrick Harper. Sharpe and Harper are the heroes of the Sharpe series of novels by Bernard Cornwell; most, though not all, of the episodes are based on the books. Produced by Celtic Films and Picture Palace Films for the ITV network, the series was filmed mainly in Crimea, with recordings of other episodes in Turkey, England, Portugal and Spain.

The series originally ran from 1993 to 1997. It consisted of fourteen episodes, each with a running time of around 100 minutes. In 2006, ITV premiered Sharpe's Challenge, a two-part adventure loosely based on his time in India, with Sean Bean reprising his role as Sharpe. Filming of Sharpe's Peril, also set in India, was produced by Celtic Film/Picture Palace in 2008. The first part was broadcast on ITV and UTV on 2 November 2008, with the second part shown a week later. Sharpe's Challenge and Sharpe's Peril were broadcast in the US in 2010 as part of PBS's Masterpiece Classic season.

The complete series is available on VHS (excluding Sharpe's Challenge and Sharpe's Peril), DVD, Blu-ray and iTunes. The Blu-ray and iTunes releases have been remastered in HD widescreen from the original filmstrips, with the former format available in a special collector's edition box set.

== Plot summary ==
At the beginning of the series, Richard Sharpe is a sergeant in the 95th Rifles, serving in Portugal during the Peninsular War in 1809. When he single-handedly saves the life of General Sir Arthur Wellesley from three French cavalrymen, Wellesley gives Sharpe a battlefield commission, appointing him a lieutenant. His first command is a squad of "chosen men", battle-hardened members of the 95th with a reputation for unruly and defiant behavior. Patrick Harper eventually becomes his best friend and is promoted to sergeant and later sergeant major.

Wellesley and his various spymasters, first Major Michael Hogan, followed by Major Nairn, Major Mungo Monroe and Major General Ross, find Sharpe to be an extremely capable and cunning officer and give him progressively more important tasks. Despite their backing, he has to fight against the strong prejudice of aristocrats (who often owe their army positions to money and social connections rather than to military skill) against an uncouth commoner raised from the ranks.

Sharpe makes a number of dangerous enemies, such as French Major Pierre Ducos and Colonel Sir Henry Simmerson, and encounters one from his prior service in India, Sergeant Obadiah Hakeswill. Sharpe's successes gain him steady promotion, and by the end of the Napoleonic Wars, at the Battle of Waterloo, he holds the rank of lieutenant-colonel, joining Prince William of Orange’s staff at Wellington’s request to counter the prince's arrogance and incompetence.

Along the way, Sharpe has a number of romances. He marries the Spanish guerrilla leader Teresa Moreno, with whom he has a daughter before she is murdered by Hakeswill. Sharpe then marries Jane Gibbons, who deserts him, squanders his money, and takes a lover. He finally settles down with Lucille Castineau, a Frenchwoman who dies of illness shortly after Napoleon's final defeat. (However, according to The Starbuck Chronicles, another series of Cornwell books, she outlives Sharpe.)

== Casting ==
Initially, Paul McGann was cast in the title role; however, two weeks into filming of the first episode in Ukraine, McGann injured his knee playing football and was forced to withdraw. When production started again a month later, Sean Bean was given the role because he was the only suitable replacement available at short notice. (Cornwell was so impressed with Bean's portrayal of Sharpe that he dedicated the 12th book, Sharpe's Battle, to him and said "When I write Sharpe these days, I hear Sean's voice."). Contrary to some claims, Cornwell never expressed objections to Bean's casting on grounds of his hair colour, and regarded him as 'perfect' for the role.

The first actor cast was Daragh O'Malley as Harper. The character of Rifleman Harris, played by Jason Salkey, did not exist in the books and was created for the television series. The producers wanted a "clever one" and took inspiration from a real soldier who was illiterate but had dictated his own recollections of the war, which were published.

Some actors have played multiple roles in the series. Peter-Hugo Daly portrayed first Sergeant Rodd in Sharpe's Gold and then Bickerstaff, another unruly sergeant who dislikes Sharpe. Julian Fellowes played Major Warren Dunnett in Sharpe's Rifles and also the Prince Regent in Sharpe's Regiment. Tony Haygarth was "Marshal" Pot-au-Feu in Sharpe's Enemy and Sir Willoughby Parfitt in Sharpe's Justice.

== List of episodes ==
The episodes are listed by first airing date.

No.	Date Aired	Episode Name	Setting	Date Set	Directed by	Written by
1	5 May 1993	Sharpe's Rifles	Portugal / Spain	1809	Tom Clegg	Eoghan Harris
2	12 May 1993	Sharpe's Eagle	Battle of Talavera	1809	Tom Clegg	Eoghan Harris
3	25 May 1994	Sharpe's Company	Siege of Badajoz	1812	Tom Clegg	Charles Wood
4	1 June 1994	Sharpe's Enemy	Portugal	1813	Tom Clegg	Eoghan Harris
5	8 June 1994	Sharpe's Honour	Battle of Vitoria	1813	Tom Clegg	Colin MacDonald
6	12 April 1995	Sharpe's Gold	Spain	1813	Tom Clegg	Nigel Kneale
7	19 April 1995	Sharpe's Battle	Franco–Spanish border	1813	Tom Clegg	Russell Lewis
8	26 April 1995	Sharpe's Sword	Franco–Spanish border	1813	Tom Clegg	Eoghan Harris
9	1 May 1996	Sharpe's Regiment	England	1813	Tom Clegg	Charles Wood
10	8 May 1996	Sharpe's Siege	Bordeaux	1813	Tom Clegg	Eoghan Harris
11	15 May 1996	Sharpe's Mission	Napoleonic France	1810 & 1813	Tom Clegg	Eoghan Harris
12	7 May 1997	Sharpe's Revenge	Toulouse	1814	Tom Clegg	Eoghan Harris
13	14 May 1997	Sharpe's Justice	Yorkshire, Peace of 1814	1814	Tom Clegg	Patrick Harbinson
14	21 May 1997	Sharpe's Waterloo	Battle of Waterloo	1815	Tom Clegg	Charles Wood
15	23 April 2006 – Part 1; 24 April 2006 – Part 2	Sharpe's Challenge	India	1803 & 1817	Tom Clegg	Russell Lewis
16	2 November 2008 – Part 1; 9 November 2008 – Part 2	Sharpe's Peril	India	1818	Tom Clegg	Russell Lewis

== Cast and crew ==
Cast timelineM Main cast (opening credits); G Guest cast (closing credits)
Role	Actor	Appearances															
Role	Actor	1993		1994			1995			1996			1997			2006	2008
Role	Actor	1	2	3	4	5	6	7	8	9	10	11	12	13	14	15	16
Richard Sharpe	Sean Bean	M	M	M	M	M	M	M	M	M	M	M	M	M	M	M	M
Michael Hogan	Brian Cox	M	M														
Patrick Harper	Daragh O'Malley	M	M	M	M	M	M	M	M	M	M	M	M	M	M	M	M
Teresa Moreno	Assumpta Serna	M	M	M	M												
Lord Wellington	David Troughton	M	M														
Lord Wellington	Hugh Fraser			M	M	M	M	M			M	M			M	M	
Henry Simmerson	Michael Cochrane		M						M	M						M	M
Major Nairn	Michael Byrne			M	M	M											
Obadiah Hakeswill	Pete Postlethwaite			M	M												
Pierre Ducos	Féodor Atkine				G	M					M		M				
Mungo Monroe	Hugh Ross						M	M	M								
Jane Gibbons	Abigail Cruttenden									M	M	M	M	M	M		
Anne Camoynes	Caroline Langrishe									M				M			
Hector Ross	James Laurenson									M	M	M	M				
William Frederickson	Philip Whitchurch				G						M		M				
John Rossendale	Alexis Denisof									G (Note: Initially played by Alexander Armstrong in episode 9.)			M	M	M		
Lucille Castineau	Cécile Paoli												M		M		

=== Main cast members ===
- Sean Bean as Sergeant (later Lieutenant-Colonel) Richard Sharpe
- Brian Cox as Major Michael Hogan (episodes 1–2)
- Daragh O'Malley as Rifleman (later Sergeant and then Sergeant Major) Patrick Harper
- Assumpta Serna as Comandante Teresa Moreno (episodes 1–4)
- David Troughton (episodes 1–2) and Hugh Fraser (episodes 3–7, 10–11, 14–15) as Sir Arthur Wellesley, Lord Wellington
- Michael Cochrane as Colonel (later General) Sir Henry Simmerson (episodes 2, 8–9, 15–16)
- Michael Byrne as Major Nairn (episodes 3–5)
- Clive Francis as Colonel Brian Windham (Sharpe's Company)
- Nicholas Jones as Colonel Fletcher (Sharpe's Company)
- Pete Postlethwaite as Sergeant Obadiah Hakeswill (episodes 3–4)
- Jeremy Child as Sir Augustus Farthingdale (Sharpe's Enemy)
- François Guétary as Colonel Michel Dubreton (Sharpe's Enemy)
- Tony Haygarth as Marshal Pot-au-Feu (Sharpe's Enemy) and Sir Willoughby Parfitt (Sharpe's Justice)
- Elizabeth Hurley as Lady Isabella Farthingdale (Sharpe's Enemy)
- Nickolas Grace as Father Tomas Hacha (Sharpe's Honour)
- Alice Krige as La Marquesa de Casares el Grande y Melida Sadaba (Sharpe's Honour)
- Féodor Atkine as Major Pierre Ducos (episodes 5, 10, 12; guest episode 4)
- Matthew Scurfield as El Matarife (Sharpe's Honour)
- Jayne Ashbourne as Ellie Nugent (Sharpe's Gold)
- Peter Eyre as Will Nugent (Sharpe's Gold)
- Abel Folk as El Casco (Sharpe's Gold)
- Rosaleen Linehan as Bess Nugent (Sharpe's Gold)
- Hugh Ross as Major Mungo Munro (episodes 6–8)
- Allie Byrne as Lady Lucy Kiely (Sharpe's Battle)
- Oliver Cotton as Brigadier General Guy Loup (Sharpe's Battle)
- Jason Durr as Lord Benedict Kiely (Sharpe's Battle)
- Ian McNeice as Wagonmaster-General Colonel Runciman (Sharpe's Battle)
- Patrick Fierry as Colonel Philippe Leroux (Sharpe's Sword)
- John Kavanaugh as Father Patrick Curtis (Sharpe's Sword)
- Stephen Moore as Colonel Berkely (Sharpe's Sword)
- James Purefoy as Captain Jack Spears (Sharpe's Sword)
- Abigail Cruttenden as Jane Gibbons Sharpe (episodes 9–14)
- Nicholas Farrell as Lord Simon Fenner (Sharpe's Regiment)
- Julian Fellowes as Major Warren Dunnet (guest, Sharpe's Rifles) and The Prince Regent (Sharpe's Regiment)
- Mark Lambert as Lieutenant Colonel Bartholomew Girdwood (Sharpe's Regiment)
- Caroline Langrishe as Lady Anne Camoynes (episodes 9, 13)
- James Laurenson as Major General Hector Ross (episodes 9–12)
- Norman Rossington as Sergeant Horatio Havercamp (Sharpe's Regiment)
- Christian Brendel as Comte de Maquerre (Sharpe's Siege)
- Christopher Villiers as Colonel Horace Bampfylde (Sharpe's Siege)
- Philip Whitchurch as Captain William Frederickson ("Sweet William") (episodes 10, 12; guest episode 4)
- Andrew Schofield as Sergeant Pope (Sharpe's Mission)
- Mark Strong as Colonel Brand (Sharpe's Mission)
- John Benfield as General Jean-Baptiste Calvet (Sharpe's Revenge)
- Alexis Denisof as John Rossendale (episodes 12–14)
- Cécile Paoli as Lucille Castineau, Madame la Vicomtessa de Seleglise (episodes 12, 14)
- Philip Martin Brown as Saunders (Sharpe's Justice)
- Philip Glenister as Matt Truman (Sharpe's Justice)
- Douglas Henshall as Captain George Wickham (Sharpe's Justice)
- Paul Bettany as Prince William of Orange (Sharpe's Waterloo)
- Neil Dickson as Lord Uxbridge (Sharpe's Waterloo)
- Oliver Tobias as Colonel Rebecque (Sharpe's Waterloo)
- Toby Stephens as Major William Dodd (Sharpe's Challenge)
- Padma Lakshmi as Madhuvanthi (Sharpe's Challenge)
- Aurélien Recoing as Gudin (Sharpe's Challenge)
- Lucy Brown as Celia Burroughs (Sharpe's Challenge)
- Alyy Khan as Mohan Singh (Sharpe's Challenge)
- Caroline Carver as Mrs. Tredinnick (Sharpe's Peril)
- Raza Jaffrey as Lance Naik Singh (Sharpe's Peril)
- Pascal Langdale as Major Philippe Joubert (Sharpe's Peril)
- Jonathan Moore as Reverend Watkin (Sharpe's Peril)
- David Robb as Major Tredinnick (Sharpe's Peril)
- Steve Speirs as Colour Sergeant Silas Wormwood (Sharpe's Peril)
- Velibor Topić as Col. Count Vladimir Dragomirov (Sharpe's Peril)
- Luke Ward-Wilkinson as Ensign the Hon. Percival Beauclere (Sharpe's Peril)
- Beatrice Rosen as Marie-Angelique Bonnet (Sharpe's Peril)

=== Supporting cast members ===
Chosen men

- John Tams as Rifleman (later Sergeant) Daniel Hagman (episodes 1–14) – killed in battle in Sharpe's Waterloo
- Jason Salkey as Rifleman (later Sergeant) Harris (episodes 1–14) – killed in battle in Sharpe's Waterloo, in the novel he is not at Waterloo and presumably survives
- Lyndon Davies as Rifleman Ben Perkins (episodes 1–7) – stabbed by O'Rourke in Sharpe's Battle and dies in Harper's arms, in the novels he survives
- Michael Mears as Rifleman Francis Cooper (episodes 1–6) – disappears after Sharpe's Gold due to a disagreement with the production team (although he returned to narrate the clip show Sharpe the Legend)
- Paul Trussell as Rifleman Isaiah Tongue (episodes 1–2) – disappears after Sharpe's Eagle and never returns, in novels he is killed in Sharpe's Gold

Other supporting cast members

- Martin Jacobs (episodes 1–2) and Benedict Taylor (Sharpe's Regiment) as Colonel William Lawford
- Kerry Shale as James Rothschild (Sharpe's Rifles)
- Simón Andreu as Major Blas Vivar (Sharpe's Rifles)
- Tim Bentinck as Captain John Murray (Sharpe's Rifles)
- Daniel Craig as Lieutenant John Berry (Sharpe's Eagle)
- David Ashton as Major Lennox (Sharpe's Eagle)
- Neil Dudgeon as Lieutenant Christian Gibbons (Sharpe's Eagle)
- Gavan O'Herlihy as Captain Thomas Leroy (Sharpe's Eagle)
- Marc Warren as Captain Rymer (Sharpe's Company)
- Diana Perez as Ramona Gonzalez Harper (episodes 4–15)
- Emily Mortimer as Lass (Sharpe's Sword)
- Olivier Pierre as General Jean-Baptiste Calvet (episodes 10–11)
- Alexander Armstrong as Lord John Rossendale (Sharpe's Regiment)

=== Production team ===
- Directed by Tom Clegg
- Produced by Malcolm Craddock, Muir Sutherland
- Written by Bernard Cornwell (novels), Eoghan Harris (7 episodes), Charles Wood (4 episodes), Russell Lewis (3 episodes), Nigel Kneale (1 episode), Colin MacDonald (1 episode), Patrick Harbinson (1 episode)

== Soundtrack ==
Soundtrack cover art

Over the Hills & Far Away: The Music of Sharpe was released in 1996 as a companion to the television series by Virgin Records. The recording features performances by various artists, including British folk musicians John Tams (who played the supporting role of "Rifleman Daniel Hagman" in the series and wrote or arranged much of its music) and Kate Rusby, composer Dominic Muldowney, and The Band and Bugles of the Light Division, performing traditional songs along with selections of original music from the programmes.

Track list

1. "The Overture" - 2:48
2. "I'm Ninety Five" - 0:50
3. "Over The Hills And Far Away" - 3:48
4. "The Spanish Sword" - 1:29
5. "Rogue's March" - 0:32
6. "The Collier Recruit" - 4:16
7. "The Bird In The Bush / The Colours" - 3:50
8. "The Spanish Bride" - 6:56
9. "The Shilling" - 2:00
10. "Gentleman Soldier" - 0:35
11. "Bugle Call / Moneymusk ~ Regimental Double Past" - 0:49
12. "Broken-Hearted I Will Wander" - 4:19
13. "Badajoz" - 3:58
14. "The Rambling Soldier" - 1:43
15. " The Huntsman's Chorus / The Italian Song" - 2:15
16. "Johnny Is Gone For A Soldier" - 3:24
17. "The Forlorn Hope" - 2:05
18. "Love Farewell" - 3:08
19. "Sunset" - 1:38
20. "Sharpe's Song / Sharpe's Theme" - 1:39

== See also ==
- South Essex Regiment
- Over the Hills and Far Away, the theme song of the series
