= Sharpe's Justice =

British television film

- Title screen from Sharpe's Justice
- Based on: Richard Sharpe by Bernard Cornwell
- Written by: Patrick Harbinson; John Tams
- Directed by: Tom Clegg
- Starring: Sean Bean; Daragh O'Malley; Abigail Cruttenden; Alexis Denisof
- Theme music composer: Dominic Muldowney; John Tams
- Country of origin: United Kingdom
- Original language: English

Production
- Producers: Malcolm Craddock; Muir Sutherland (exec.)
- Editor: Keith Palmer
- Running time: 100 minutes

Original release
- Release: 14 May 1997

Related
- Sharpe's Revenge; Sharpe's Waterloo

Sharpe's Justice is a British television drama, the 13th episode of a series that follows the career of Richard Sharpe, a fictional British soldier during the Napoleonic Wars. Unlike most of the other instalments of the series, this episode was not based on a novel by Bernard Cornwell. A key scene in the story is based on the Peterloo Massacre of 1819, reset here to Keighley in Yorkshire, in 1814.

== Plot ==
It is 1814. There is peace in Europe as a defeated Napoleon is sent into exile on the island of Elba. Major Sharpe is assigned to head the Scarsdale Yeomanry in his native Yorkshire, depriving him of a chance to settle the score with his adulterous wife Jane and her lover, Lord Rossendale.

Sharpe and Regimental Sergeant Major Harper are met on their arrival by Captain George Wickham, an officer in the Yeomanry. As he escorts them to town, they are ambushed and shot at. Sharpe kills one assailant and pursues (but does not catch) one of the men, who turns out to be his close childhood friend, Matthew Truman.

Wickham takes Sharpe to meet Sir Willoughby Parfitt and Sir Percy Stanwyck, wealthy businessmen who own many cotton mills between them. Parfitt tells Sharpe about the post-war unrest. The discharge of men from the army has flooded England with unemployed workmen; the increased competition and a reduced demand for cotton gives Parfitt an excuse to lower wages. He is opposed by Truman, a rabble rouser who stirs up the discontented, poverty-stricken masses.

Meanwhile, the financially strapped Rossendale inherits an estate in neighbouring Lancashire. He had used his influence to get Sharpe posted as far from London as possible, but now has to relocate (with Jane) nearby. Sharpe learns of this and visits Jane while Rossendale is out hunting; he tells her that he wants his £10,000 back or he will hurt Rossendale when he sees him.

Dan Hagman, one of Sharpe's former chosen men, shows up and saves Sharpe from Truman; he is looking for work, but turns down Sharpe's offer to join the yeomanry – nine years in uniform is enough for him. He becomes a follower of Truman.

When Sharpe hears of a public meeting held by Truman, he arrives and orders his soldiers to allow the audience to leave but to capture Truman. Wickham deliberately disobeys his orders and incites a massacre having his men attack the civilians; Truman gets away in the confusion. As news of the massacre spreads out, Wickham lies to Parfitt and places the blame on Sharpe, which makes Sharpe a wanted man.

Sharpe visits Sally Bunting, a woman who had been kind to him in his childhood. From her, he learns that his mother is dead and also that Truman is his brother. He arranges to meet in secret with him at their mother's grave. Parfitt learns of it and sends Wickham to take them both. Sharpe, Harper and Hagman get away, but Truman is shot dead by Wickham.

While in hiding, Sharpe is visited by Lady Anne Camoynes, she has been staying with Parfitt and learned how he has made his fortune. None of his mills ever get attacked; he gets Wickham to burn rival businessmen's mills and buys them at a knockdown price. Truman and his followers are innocent of these crimes. In order to weaken Stanwyck next, Parfitt intends to have Wickham intercept and destroy a modern steam engine that is being brought in, blaming it once more on disaffected machine breakers. Sharpe and his men foil the scheme and catch Wickham red-handed. Now seeing what is really going on, Stanwyck helps Sharpe to get Parfitt to clear his name, and to get Rossendale to use his influence at Horse Guards to get Sharpe relieved of command of the Scarsdale Yeomanry, reminding him that he still owes him his money.

In the aftermath, Jane confronts Sharpe at his brother's funeral, stating that he will never get his £10,000, and he needs to forget it or Rossendale will not get him his release from his commission. After the funeral, Sharpe heads back to London, Harper to Ireland, while Hagman stays behind, having taken a liking to Sally. Sharpe takes one last look behind at his men, and Yorkshire, the three part ways with Harper saying, "Vive la France."

== Cast ==
- Sean Bean – Sharpe
- Daragh O'Malley – Harper
- Abigail Cruttenden – Jane
- Alexis Denisof – Rossendale
- Philip Glenister – Truman
- Douglas Henshall – Wickham
- Tony Haygarth – Parfitt
- Caroline Langrishe – Lady Anne
- Philip Martin Brown – Saunders
- Philip Anthony – Stanwyck
- John Tams – Hagman
- Karen Meagher – Sally
- Sean O'Kane – Fosdyke
- Henry Moxon – Whitbread
- Rita May – Mrs Trent
- Richard Bremmer – Arnold
- Tony Aitken – Clerk
- Nick Conway – Sam West
