= Sharpe's Sword (TV programme) =

- Based on: Sharpe's Sword by Bernard Cornwell
- Screenplay by: Eoghan Harris
- Directed by: Tom Clegg
- Starring: Sean Bean; Daragh O'Malley; John Tams; Jason Salkey; James Purefoy; Emily Mortimer
- Country of origin: United Kingdom
- Original language: English

Production
- Running time: 100 minutes

Original release
- Network: ITV
- Release: 26 April 1995

Related
- Sharpe's Battle; Sharpe's Regiment

Sharpe's Sword is a 1995 British television drama, the eighth of a series screened on the ITV network that follows the career of Richard Sharpe, a fictional British soldier during the Napoleonic Wars. It is based on the 1983 novel of the same name by Bernard Cornwell, though it is set a year later (1813) than the book.

== Plot ==
On the French-Spanish frontier, a French patrol led by Colonel Leroux of Napoleon's Imperial Guard overtakes a carriage containing a priest and three nuns. The priest is the confessor of El Mirador, Wellington's top secret agent in Spain; he is tortured into revealing the spy's identity. Then, he and two of the nuns are killed, but the youngest, a novice, escapes.

Major Sharpe and his riflemen show up and rout the French, Leroux kills his own captain and swaps jackets to conceal his rank, allowing himself to be taken captive. Sharpe finds a piece of paper on the prisoner filled with cryptic numbers which he thinks is a code, his gut instinct makes him suspect his captive is really the colonel. Sharpe instructs polyglot, rifleman, Harris, to decode the message, but he needs the cipher, a copy of Voltaires, Candide, which Harris has mistakenly destroyed. Sharpe is unable to convince South Essex commander, colonel Berkeley, nor his fellow officer, Captain Jack Spears that the Frenchman is a colonel. Leroux is allowed to give his parole as an officer, allowing him to wander freely amongst the British camp and not be placed in manacles. The young woman, having lost her faith and being rendered mute by the horror she has witnessed, attaches herself to Sharpe.

Back at camp, Wellington's spymaster, Major Mungo Munro, has received word that Napoleon himself has sent Leroux to capture El Mirador. Munro assigns Sharpe the task of killing the colonel, but refuses to divulge the spy's identity. He sends Sharpe and the South Essex Regiment to Vilafranca, the town where El Mirador is based.

The British already control the town, but there is a French-held fort close by. When the men near the town, a surprise artillery barrage (using exploding round-shot) from the fort causes enough confusion to allow Leroux to break his parole by killing a young officer and escape to its safety.

Sharpe meets two people, his old enemy Sir Henry Simmerson, now the British representative to the town, and Father Curtis, an Irish priest, who runs the local hospital.

The regiment attacks that night, but the French have been forewarned and the assault is bloodily repulsed. Berkeley is killed at the outbreak of the battle, leaving Sharpe in charge. As Sharpe gains the top of the wall, he is faced by a ferocious counterattack led by Leroux. After a sword fight with Leroux himself, which ends in stalemate, Sharpe is wounded and demoralised at the loss of his sword. As he leads the retreat back he is shot, but not before commanding Spears to go to Munro for artillery. Sharpe is left for dead, but found by a distraught Harper. Father Curtis says Sharpe will die as the bullet is too deep, surrounded by pus. But the woman tends to his sword wound and removes the buried bullet, staying with Sharpe all night praying for him. Sharpe survives the night but has fever, which forces Father Curtis to take drastic action, helped by the woman and the chosen men they get Sharpe to recover. As Sharpe convalesces, Harper makes a deal with the father, to marry Ramona in exchange for a new sword for Sharpe, a sword which Harper works on to make battle ready. The new sword revitalises the wounded Sharpe.

In the meantime, Harris has found a copy of Candide in the hospital's library and breaks the code. The message unmasks Spears as a traitor (he had been taken captive, tortured, and then blackmailed by Leroux). However, Spears is unable to bring himself to kill El Mirador, who is revealed to be Father Curtis. When Spears arrives with the cannon, Sharpe gives the officer the opportunity for an honourable death, which he gratefully accepts.

Taking advantage of Sharpe's absence in the attack, Simmerson attempts to rape the novice (who had humiliated him earlier when he had made a crude advance), but is stopped by Father Curtis. The priest accuses Simmerson of warning the French of the first attack; when Simmerson advances on him with sword drawn, Father Curtis, an ex-soldier, unexpectedly draws his own and teaches him a very painful lesson.

The South Essex begin another attack. After the fort is softened up by an artillery barrage, the one-armed Spears charges and single-handedly plants the British flag at the fort's entrance, rousing the morale of the British soldiers, but is killed shortly after. Sharpe and the South Essex then storm the fort and win. The officers surrender and ask for parole, which is accepted, but when Leroux tries to surrender, Sharpe offers him a duel to the death instead; if he kills Sharpe, he can go free. Sharpe wins. Father Curtis manages to trick Harper into thinking he is mortally wounded, so he marries Ramona on the battle field, witnessed by all. The woman decides to stay with Father Curtis and the church. Sharpe takes one last look at her before moving on.

== Differences from the novel ==
The plot of this episode diverges from the novel in a number of substantial ways, particularly concerning some of the main characters.

- The Marchesa was written out of the episode and instead used, albeit in a completely different role, in Sharpe's Honour. She is Colonel Leroux's sister in the book. Her part in betraying the British is played by Sir Henry Simmerson, who doesn't appear in the novel.
- The character of Jack Spears was made much more sympathetic in the series. In the book, he is a gambler who lost all of his fortune at the table and is corrupted by Leroux, while in this episode he succumbs to the French colonel's tortures. He dies as a hero in both the novel and the episode, but in the former he is not urged to do so by Sharpe, who discovers the nobleman's betrayal only while he is already dying.
- Some characters, notably "Lass" and Major Munro, were created for the TV series and do not appear in the novel at all.
- Although Sergeant Harper's love for a Spanish girl is mentioned in the novel, the girl is called Isabella (not Ramona, who is a TV character only) and they do not marry. Harper is wounded both in the episode and in the novel, but in the latter his wound is much worse. Both Sharpe and Harper are wounded while trying to stop Leroux from escaping, as opposed to during the assault to the fort (which is only one in the episode, while there were three forts in the novel).
- In the novel the Battle of Salamanca is the climax of the story. Richard Sharpe takes part in the famous charge of the KGL cavalry at Garcia Hernandez and breaks French infantry squares. None of this is shown in the episode, which ends with the attack on the Salamanca forts. It is to be assumed the TV series did not show the full battle due to the numbers required and the difficulty of portraying a full cavalry charge on this scale.

== Cast ==
- Sean Bean – Sharpe
- Daragh O'Malley – Harper
- John Tams – Hagman
- Jason Salkey – Harris
- Emily Mortimer – Lass
- Patrick Fierry – Leroux
- James Purefoy – Spears
- Stephen Moore – Berkeley
- Hugh Ross – Mungo Munro
- Michael Cochrane – Sir Henry Simmerson
- John Kavanagh – Father Curtis
- Vernon Dobtcheff – Don Felipe
- Diana Perez – Ramona
- Pat Laffan – Connelly
- Walter McMonagle – Father O'Sullivan
- Matthew Pannell – Ensign McDonald
- Bob White - Pipe Major
