= Sharpe's Rifles (disambiguation) =

Sharpe's Rifles is the name of two Bernard Cornwell-based works.

- Sharpe's Rifles (novel)
- Sharpe's Rifles (TV programme)

== See also ==
Sharps rifle
