= Sharpe's Revenge (TV programme) =

- Based on: Sharpe's Revenge by Bernard Cornwell
- Screenplay by: Eoghan Harris
- Directed by: Tom Clegg
- Starring: Sean Bean; Daragh O'Malley; Abigail Cruttenden
- Theme music composer: Dominic Muldowney; John Tams
- Country of origin: United Kingdom
- Original language: English

Production
- Editor: Keith Palmer
- Running time: 100 minutes

Original release
- Network: ITV
- Release: 7 May 1997

Related
- Sharpe's Mission; Sharpe's Justice

Sharpe's Revenge is a British television drama, the 12th of a series that follows the career of Richard Sharpe, a British soldier during the Napoleonic Wars. The adaptation is based on the 1989 novel of the same name by Bernard Cornwell.

== Plot summary ==
Sharpe participates in the Battle of Toulouse, at the end of the Peninsular War. On the other side are French General Calvet and Sharpe's nemesis, Ducos, who is in charge of Napoleon's treasury. During the fighting, Sharpe encounters and humiliates Ducos, but lets him escape with his life. Napoleon loses the war and is sent into exile.

Before the battle, Sharpe gives his wife Jane power of attorney over his entire fortune of 10,000 guineas, just in case. She extracts a promise from him that this will be his last fight, that he will ask Wellington for a transfer back to England. However, after the battle, Sharpe is insulted by another British officer; for honour he challenges the man to a duel at dawn, which he wins by shooting the officer in the buttocks. Jane is told of the duel, which means Sharpe broke his promise. Infuriated, she is persuaded by her friend Lady Molly Spindacre to run away to London to spend her husband's money.

Things get out of hand when Jane becomes infatuated with the handsome Lord Rossendale. After they become lovers, he convinces her to invest her money in various projects and pay off his huge gambling debts. Eventually, she runs out of money, at which point her sponging "friend" Molly deserts her.

Meanwhile, Ducos is ordered by Calvet to take the treasure to Paris, but with the war lost, he steals it instead, framing Sharpe for the theft and murder of the guards. Sharpe is brought before a military tribunal and gaoled pending the arrival of a purported witness, Colonel Maillot, the officer in charge of the treasure's escort. In actuality, the Frenchman had rebuffed Ducos' offer to share the loot and had gone home to Normandy in disgust.

Sharpe's friends Sergeant Patrick Harper and Captain Frederickson break him out of prison. Sharpe sends Harper to England to find out why his wife took his money (which the tribunal think gives Sharpe a motive to steal the treasure), while he and Captain Frederickson head off to find Maillot to prove Sharpe's innocence. They arrive a day too late; Ducos has had him murdered shortly before to cover his tracks. Sharpe is wounded by Maillot's widowed sister, Madame Lucille DuBert, when she mistakes him for one of her brother's killers. While he recuperates, they become romantically involved, to the dismay of Captain Frederickson who had been instantly smitten with Madame DuBert as soon as he saw her.

DuBert tells Frederickson that Ducos had his spectacles made specially in Paris. Frederickson travels there and learns the whereabouts of Ducos. He is in Naples, but Frederickson is tracked by Calvet. Frederickson takes Calvet and his loyal Imperial guardsmen to Sharpe. They join forces and storm Ducos' fortress in Naples, killing his men and recovering the treasure. Sharpe shoots Ducos at long range as he flees. Ducos is dragged by his horse into the night. Sharpe returns to the tribunal, but Calvet and Madame DuBert clear Sharpe's name, with Sharpe earning the thanks of the restored king of France, Louis XVIII, thanks to the rescue of the king's treasure. Sharpe returns to Normandy with Madame DuBert, only then to start his journey back to England, taking one last look back at her.

== Cast ==
- Sean Bean – Sharpe
- Daragh O'Malley – Harper
- Abigail Cruttenden – Jane
- Philip Whitchurch – Frederickson
- Cécile Paoli – Lucille
- Alexis Denisof – Rossendale
- Féodor Atkine – Ducos
- James Laurenson – Ross
- John Benfield – Calvet
- Connie Hyde – Lady Molly
- Tom Hodgkins – Wigram
- Stéphane Cornicard – Maillot
- Phil Smeeton – Challon
- Michael Fitzgerald – Salmon
- Milton Johns – Hopkinson
- Paul Brooke – Roland
- Ercüment Balakoglu - Gaston
- Leon Lissek - Juliot

This episode marks the last time we see Major-general Ross.

== Home video ==
The first 14 episodes of the series were released on DVD by BFS Entertainment on 24 April 2001.
