= Salkey =

Salkey is a surname. Notable people with the surname include:

- Andrew Salkey (1928-1995), Jamaican novelist, poet, children's book writer, and journalist
- Jason Salkey (born 1962), English actor
