= Beatrice Rosen =

French and American actress

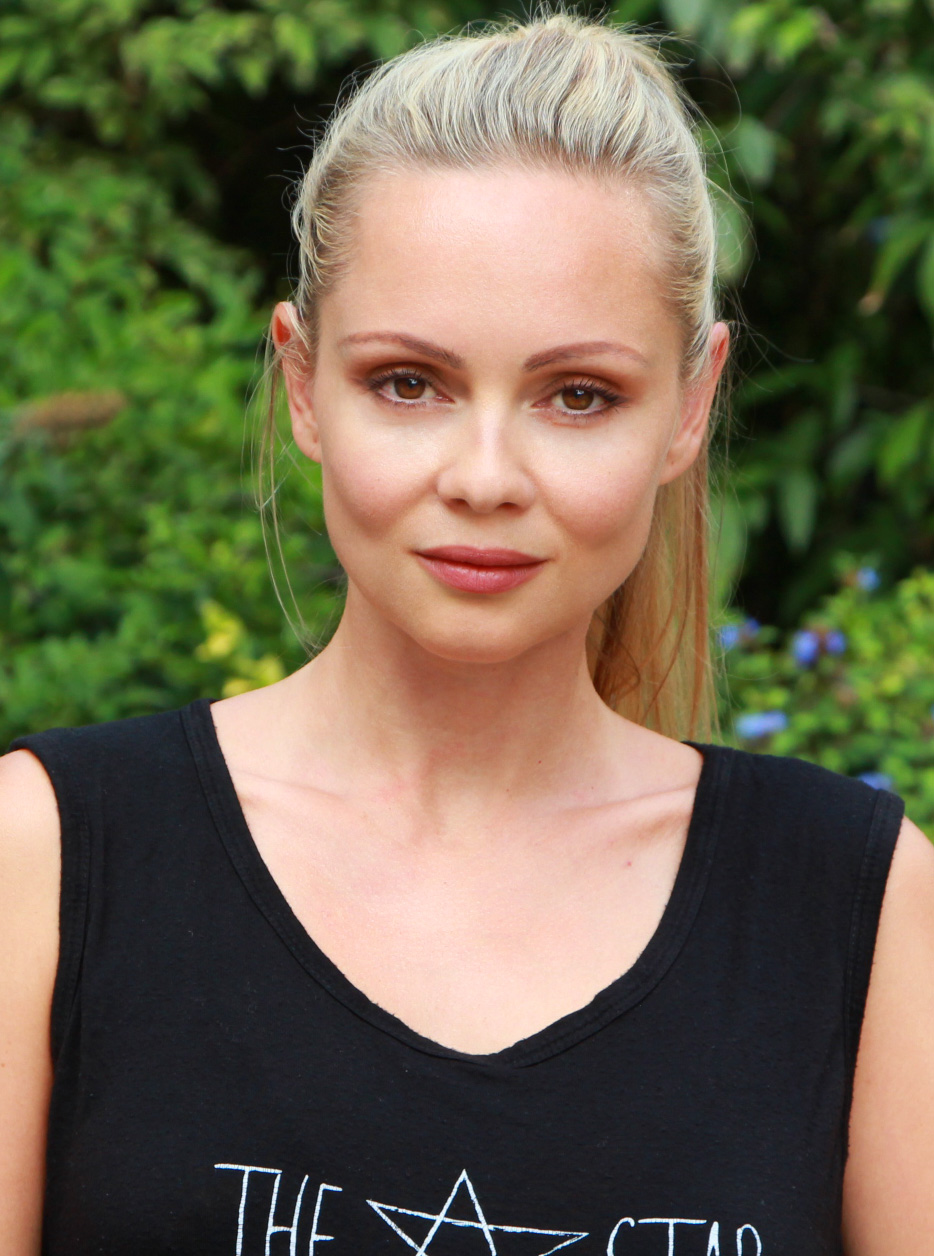
- Rosen in 2017
- Born: 29 November 1977 (age 48); New York City, U.S.
- Citizenship: American; French
- Occupation: Actress
- Years active: 1997–present

Beatrice Rosen is a French and American actress. Her credits include the TV sitcom Cuts and movie 2012.

== Early life and education ==
Born in New York City, United States to an American father and French mother, Rosen grew up in Paris, and became an actor, before moving to America in 2004 to further her career.

== Career ==
Rosen has worked in films and television in the US, France and in the UK. She portrayed Gabrielle la Claire, daughter of the French ambassador in the film Chasing Liberty (2004). She played a role in the final season of the WB series Charmed (2005), as innocent Maya Holmes as Piper Halliwell's first new identity. She appeared in the fourth season of the WB series Smallville (2005), as Dawn Stiles, a girl who wanted desperately to be prom queen. In 2008, she played Natascha, the prima ballerina and Bruce Wayne's date, in Christopher Nolan's The Dark Knight (2008). She appeared in Sharpe's Peril of the Sharpe series in 2008.

Rosen was a series regular on the comedy series Cuts (2005–2006), She played Tamara in the Roland Emmerich film 2012 (2009).

Rosen also played Marylin Monique in David E. Kelley's legal drama Harry's Law during the 2010–11 television season.

In 2010 and 2011 Rosen was Lancel's brand ambassador.

In 2015, she played Nadia Paquet in the Fox drama Backstrom.

Beatrice Rosen lives with her Italian boyfriend or partner and their two children, a boy born in 2015 and a girl born in 2018.

== Filmography ==
Film and Television
Year	Title	Role	Notes
1998	La vieille barrière	Une étudiante	Short film
1998	Un et un font six	La standardiste	Episode: "Très chère maison"
1999	Le ciel, les oiseaux,... et ta mère!		
1999	In punta di cuore	Clara	TV movie
1999	La révolution sexuelle n'a pas eu lieu	Jeune fille 7	
1999	Vertiges	Eliane Vercel	Episode: "Le fil du rasoir"
1999	Manatea, les perles du Pacifique	Pauline	TV series
1999	Clown	Blond Girl	Short film
2000	Passion assassine		TV movie
2000–2001	Baie ouest	Leslie	TV series
2002	Cravate club		
2002	Undercover	Audrey	Short film
2003	Welcome to the Roses	Agnes	
2003	Le bleu de l'océan	Vanessa	TV miniseries
2004	Commando Nanny	Katie Winter	TV series
2004	Chasing Liberty	Gabrielle	
2004	Le grand patron	Stéphanie Celnik	Episode: "Soupçons"
2004	Quintuplets	Gabrielle	Episode: "Thanksgiving Day Charade"
2004	North Shore	Mia	Episode: "Sucker Punch"
2005	Smallville	Dawn Stiles	Episode: "Spirit"
2005	Charmed	Jenny Bennett / Maya Holmes	3 episodes
2005–2006	Cuts	Faith Drake	17 episodes
2006	Blindfolded	Gorgeous	Short film
2006	Peaceful Warrior	Dory	
2008	The Other Side of the Tracks	Marcy	
2008	The Dark Knight	Natascha	
2008	Sharpe's Peril	Marie Angelique	TV movie
2009	2012	Tamara Jikan	
2010	The Big I Am	Liza	
2010	100 Questions	Arielle Goodman	Episode: "Have You Ever Had a One-Night Stand?"
2010	Life's a Beach	Isabelle	
2011	Nikita	Princess Kristina	Episode: "Coup de Grace"
2011	Harry's Law	Marylin Monique	Episode: "The Fragile Beast"
2011	Law & Order: Criminal Intent	Andrea Stiles	Episode: "The Last Street in Manhattan"
2012	Side Effects	Ivy	
2012	Road Nine	Nadia	
2012	Le Sang de la vigne	Victoire	Episode: "Boire et déboires en Val de Loire"
2013	(Im)parfaites	Emmanuelle	
2013	Under the Rainbow	Fanfan	
2013	The Smurfs 2	Stork Model	
2013	Payday	Special agent Jordan Griffin	
2013	Delirium	Kate	
2014	Zugzwang	Jenny Williams	
2014	Taxi Brooklyn	Aimee	Episode: "Revenge"
2015	Backstrom	Nadia Paquet	
2017	The Saint	Katherine Valecross	TV movie
2020	Section de recherches	Virginie Bells	Episode: "Première Pierre"
2023	La tête dans les étoiles	Constance	Movie: "Head in the Clouds"
