= Russell Lewis =

British television writer and actor

- Born: Russell Lewis; 11 September 1963 (age 63); London, England
- Occupations: Screenwriter and former child actor
- Years active: 1967–present

Russell Lewis (born 11 September 1963) is an English television writer and former actor. He created and wrote the Inspector Morse prequel Endeavour (2012–2023), and the first two series of Grace (2021–2022).

== Career ==
Lewis was born in London and began his career as a child actor, first appearing in the films The Looking Glass War (1970) and Sunday Bloody Sunday (1971). He played the 7-year-old Winston Churchill in Young Winston (1972), and featured in the 1973 horror films Tales That Witness Madness (as a boy who befriends an invisible tiger) and Voices. He also starred as George Gathercole in The Kids from 47A. He appeared as the young Lucius in I, Claudius (1976) and in an episode of London's Burning in 1989.

By the mid-1980s, Lewis had begun to write for television series; his writing credits include episodes of Perfect Scoundrels, Taggart, The Bill, Wycliffe, Inspector Morse, Kavanagh QC, The Ambassador, Monsignor Renard, Playing the Field, Without Motive, The Last Detective, Murphy's Law, Spooks and Lewis. Lewis has co-written three of the Sharpe films, Sharpe's Battle, Sharpe's Challenge and 2008's Sharpe's Peril. He also penned several episodes of Cadfael and an episode of Hornblower.

In 2009, Russell adapted Agatha Christie's novel The Pale Horse for the fifth series of ITV's Agatha Christie's Marple, starring Julia McKenzie, which first aired in 2010.

He devised and wrote the Inspector Morse prequel Endeavour which was first broadcast on 2 January 2012. He wrote the pilot film and all 35 of the subsequent one-hour-thirty instalments in total, ranging from Series 1 in 2013 to Series 9 in 2023.

In 2021, Lewis recorded an Audio Commentary for the first episode of The Bill that he wrote, entitled "Forget-Me-Not", alongside actress Lynne Miller (WPC Cathy Marshall), released on The Bill Podcast Patreon Channel.

Lewis wrote Grace, which is based on the bestselling books by author Peter James. The first series was one standalone episode, with the second series premiering on 24 April 2022.

== Awards ==
In 1993, Lewis won the Writers' Guild of Great Britain TV - Original Drama Series Award for Between the Lines. The award was shared with the other writers of the show at the time, J.C. Wilsher, Rob Heyland, Steve Trafford and Michael Russell.

== Filmography ==
Year	Title	Role	Notes
1970	The Looking Glass War	Avery's Child	
1971	Sunday Bloody Sunday	Hodson Child	
1972	Young Winston	Winston (aged 7)	
1973	The Love Ban		
1973	Tales That Witness Madness	Paul	(segment "Mr. Tiger")
1973	Voices	John	
1976	The Blue Bird	Children of the Future	
1976	I, Claudius	Young Lucius	Episode 2
