= Peter-Hugo Daly =

British actor and musician (born 1956)

Peter-Hugo Daly (born 1956 in Islington, London) is an actor and musician. In the late 1970s and early 1980s, he was a member of new wave band the Cross along with fellow actor Phil Daniels. The band released a 1979 single, "Kill Another Night", on RCA Records. In 1980, Daly appeared with Daniels as drummer Mick "Lethal" in the Hazel O'Connor film Breaking Glass.

Extensive television appearances include Minder, Bergerac, The Bill, Birds of a Feather, Foyle's War, Martin Chuzzlewit, Silent Witness, New Tricks, Midsomer Murders, Between the Lines, Little Dorrit, The History Man, Lark Rise to Candleford, Alan Bleasdale's G.B.H., and as Dave Morris in McLibel!. He appeared in two of the Sharpe television films: Sharpe's Gold (1995) and Sharpe's Challenge (2006).

Film appearances include Julien Temple's Absolute Beginners, Martin Scorsese's Gangs of New York, Woody Allen's Cassandra's Dream, and Made in Dagenham.

Theatre credits include Kid in Strawberry Fields (1977) at Royal National Theatre, Crass in The Ragged Trousered Philanthropists, Saved at Royal Court Theatre, and Class Enemy.

== Partial filmography ==
- Breaking Glass (1980) - Mick
- Oxford Blues (1984) - Malcolm
- Absolute Beginners (1986) - Vern
- Madame Sousatzka (1988) - Roadie
- Schluckauf (1992) - Freddy
- The General (1998) - Beavis, Fence
- The Escort (1999) - Marco
- Paranoid (2000) - Ellis
- Secret Society (2000) - Barry
- This Filthy Earth (2001) - Jesus Christ
- Gangs of New York (2002) - One-Armed Priest
- Sharpe's Challenge (2006) - Sergeant Shadrach Bickerstaff
- Cassandra's Dream (2007) - Boat Owner
- Love Me Still (2008) - Mark
- Made in Dagenham (2010) - Bartholomew
- Wild Bill (2011) - Keith
- Electricity (2014) - Mr. Morris
- Angel (2015) - Uncle Tommy
