= Velibor Topić =

Bosnian-British actor (born 1970)

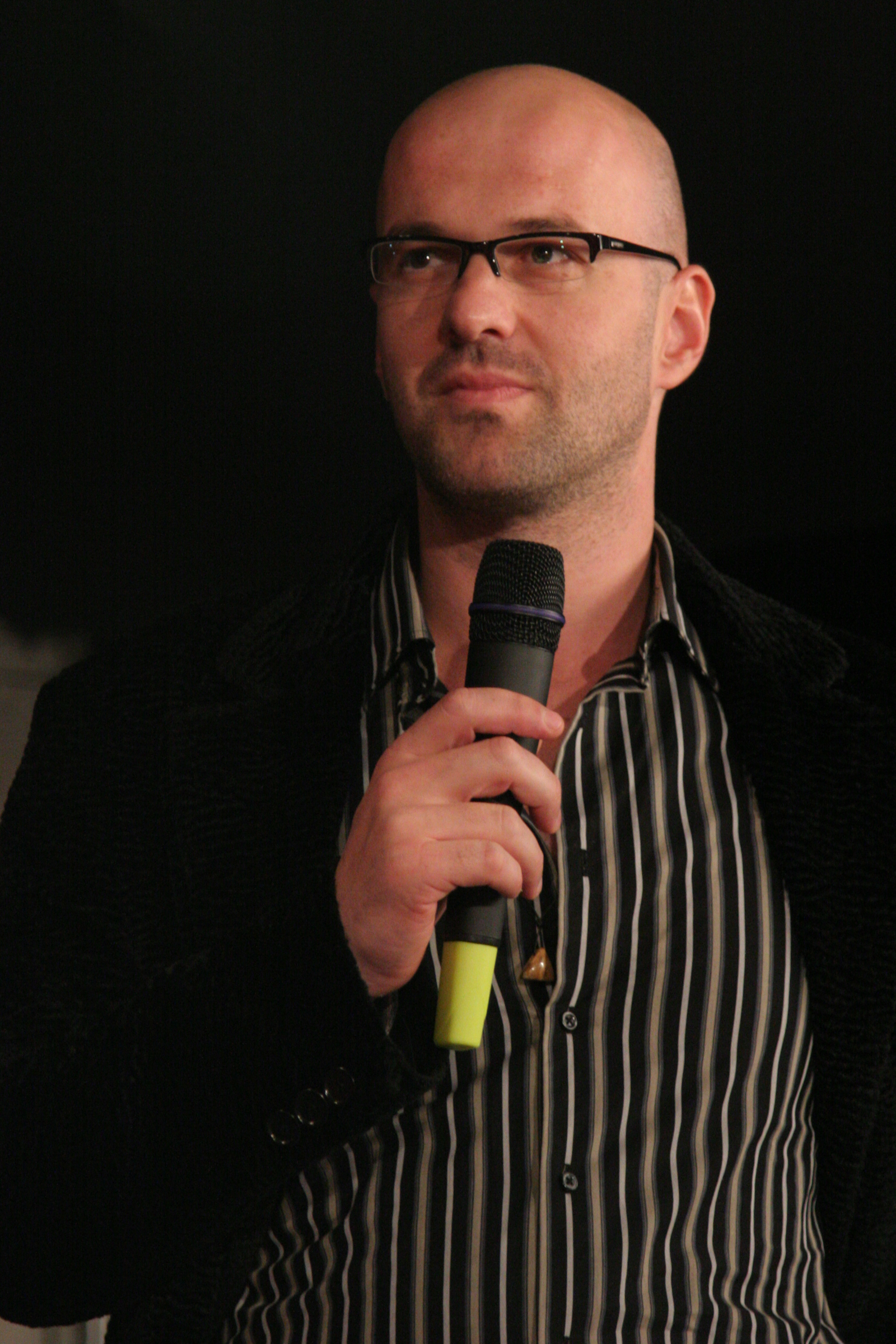
- Topić in October 2007
- Born: 24 July 1970 (age 56); Mostar, SR Bosnia and Herzegovina, SFR Yugoslavia
- Occupation: Actor
- Years active: 1984–present

Velibor Topić (born 24 July 1970 in Mostar, SR Bosnia and Herzegovina, SFR Yugoslavia) is a Bosnian actor.

He is known for his roles in Snatch (2000), Kingdom of Heaven (2005), Robin Hood (2010), The Counselor (2013), Kingsman: The Secret Service (2014), as well as for his work in British TV dramas such as Sharpe's Peril (2002), The Bill (2002), Prime Suspect series 6 (2003), and Ambassadors (2013).

Throughout his career, Topić has worked three times with Ridley Scott as well as other well-known directors such as Guy Ritchie, Tom Hooper, Matthew Vaughn, Anthony Minghella and William Monahan.

== Early life ==
Topić was born in Mostar, Bosnia and Herzegovina (former SFR Yugoslavia), to a family of mixed Serbian, Bosniak and Croatian heritage.

During the war he lived in Sarajevo where he formed part of a theatre group. He also appears in one of Annie Leibovitz's photographs from the time called "Sarajevo – The Kiss".

== Career ==
In 1996 he moved to London.

Topić has over 69 acting credits in UK film, television and Hollywood film productions.

== Filmography ==
Year	Film	Role	Notes
1997	The Saint	Skinhead	Film starring: Val Kilmer, Elisabeth Shue, Rade Serbedzija
1997	Taggart	Alexei Kianovich	TV series
1997	Police 2020	Mikki Ostrovsky	Film starring Liam Cunningham
1999	Casualty	Andrei Dimitriov	TV series
2000	The Railway Children	Mr. Szczepansky	
2000	Snatch	The Russian	Film starring Brad Pitt, Benicio Del Toro, Jason Statham
2001	As If	Cabbie	TV series
2001	Always and Everyone	Savo	TV series
2001	Bodywork	Rudi Scott	
2001	Randall and Hopkirk	Cabbie	TV series
2002	The Red Siren		
2002	Ultimate Force	Boban Haradic	TV series
2003	Messiah	Davor Pasovic	TV miniseries: Messiah II: Vengeance Is Mine
2003	The Vice	Riccardo	TV series
2003	Prime Suspect	Dusan Zigic	TV series starring Helen Mirren, Prime Suspect 6: The Last Witness
2003	Tomb Raider: The Angel of Darkness	Marten Gunderson (voice)	Video game voices: Jonell Elliott, Eric Loren
2004	William and Mary	Bogdan	TV series
2004	Cargo	Branko	
2005	Kingdom of Heaven	Almaric	Film starring Orlando Bloom, Eva Green, Jeremy Irons, Brendan Gleeson, Liam Neeson, Edward Norton
2005	Silent Witness	Chric Pivcevic	TV series, Episode: "The Meaning of Death"
2005	Rose and Maloney	Malek Dimitriev	TV series
2006	Holby City	Mirko Kovacevic	TV series
2006	Second in Command	Anton Tavarov	Film starring: Jean-Claude Van Damme
2006	Coming Up	Ilya	TV series
2006	Breaking and Entering	Vlado	Film starring Jude Law, Juliette Binoche, Robin Wright
2007	The All Together	Bob Music	Film starring Martin Freeman
2007	HolbyBlue	Neculai Stenga	TV series
2007	The Living and the Dead	Vijali	Croatian war movie Big Golden Arena for Best Film at the Pula Film Festival
2007	The Englishman	Henry	
2008	Sharpe's Peril	Dragomirov	Film starring Sean Bean
2009	Extreme Vocational Experiences	Real Assassin X	Short
2009	The Bill	Kreshnik Berisha / Slawomir Zelazny / Ion Goga	TV series 1999–2009, starred in 6 episodes
2009	Goal III: Taking on the World	Romanian Barman	
2010	Hustle	Charlie	TV series
2010	Robin Hood	Belvedere	Film starring Russell Crowe, Cate Blanchett
2010	Thorne	Pavel	TV series
2010	GoldenEye	Additional voices (voice)	Video game: Voices: Daniel Craig, Judi Dench
2010	London Boulevard	Storbor	Film starring Colin Farrell, Keira Knightley
2011	Cars 2	Alexander Hugo (voice)	Voices: Owen Wilson, Michael Caine, John Turturro
2012	Children of Sarajevo	Mirsad Melic	
2012	St George's Day	Albanian Thug	
2012	007 Legends	Additional Voices (voice)	Video game voices: Judi Dench, Rory Kinnear
2013	Company of Heroes	Soviet soldier	Film starring Tom Sizemore
2013	Outpost : Rise of the Spetsnaz	Arkadi	
2013	The Counselor	Sedan Man	Film starring Michael Fassbender, Penélope Cruz, Brad Pitt, Cameron Diaz, Javier Bardem, Goran Visnjic, Natalie Dormer
2013	Ambassadors	Svecko	TV miniseries
2013	Convenience	Ivan	
2014	Mea Culpa	Milan	
2014	Da Vinci's Demons	Mihail	TV series
2014	Flim: The Movie	Vuk	
2014	Coming Up	Ilya	TV series
2014	The Smoke	Dmitri	TV series
2014	The Game	KGB Hood / Hood 1	TV series starring Tom Hughes, Brian Cox
2014	The Healer	Mak	
2014	Suspects	Marek	TV series
2014	Kingsman: The Secret Service	Biggest goon	Film starring Colin Firth, Michael Caine, Samuel L. Jackson
2015	Vera	Milosh Beqiri	TV series
2015	Never Let Go	Vladislav	
2016	Our Kind of Traitor	Emilio Del Oro	Film starring Ewan McGregor, Stellan Skarsgård, Naomie Harris
2016	The Witness	Marko	
2016	The White Room	Mak	
2017	Dead Fish (Mrtve ribe)	Dragan	
2017 - 2018	Čista ljubav	Dominik	TV series
2018	Rest in Peace	Igla	TV series
2018	Experiment 77	Jake	
2018	Dead In A Week (or your money back)	Ivan	
2018	Mission: Impossible – Fallout	Zola Enforcer	
2025	Den of Thieves 2: Pantera	Mirinko	
