= John Benfield =

British actor (1951–2020)

- Born: Jonathan Edmund Fulford Turner; 9 November 1951; Wanstead, Essex, England
- Died: 16 June 2020 (aged 68)
- Occupations: Film and television actor
- Children: 1

Jonathan Edmund Fulford Turner (9 November 1951 – 16 June 2020), better known by his stage name John Benfield, was a British character actor.

== Early life and education ==
Benfield was born in Wanstead, Essex, the son of margarine sales representative Fred Turner and his wife Joan, née White. He was educated at Loughton school, then the town's further education college; after four years as an ambulance driver in London, he studied history at the University of Nottingham, during which time he discovered a passion for acting with the drama society. After training at the Webber Douglas Academy of Dramatic Art from 1976 to 1978, with there already an actor called "John Turner", he assumed the stage name "John Benfield", the surname coming from his mother's side.

== Career ==
Benfield appeared in 75 television episodes or films starting in 1981 with small parts in BBC drama adaptations, such as The Winter's Tale and The Day of the Triffids.

== Personal life ==
Benfield lived in Oxfordshire with his wife, Lilian, née Lees. They had one son.

He died of sarcoma in June 2020 at the age of 68.

== Filmography ==
=== Film ===
- Breakout (1984) as Minder
- Whoops Apocalypse (1986) as Secret Service Agent
- Buster (1988) as Jimmy
- Hidden Agenda (1990) as Maxwell
- In the Name of the Father (1993) as Chief Prison Officer Barker
- Beautiful Thing (1996) as Rodney Barr
- 101 Dalmatians (1996) as Doorman
- Owd Bob (1998) as Blake
- Cousin Bette (1998) as Dr. Bianchon
- You're Dead (1999) as Badger
- 24 Hours in London (2000) as Insp. Duggan
- Lover's Prayer (2001) as Nirmansky
- Endgame (2001) as Dunston
- Den tredje vågen (2003) as Stevens
- Evilenko (2004)
- Flood (2007) as Frank
- Cassandra's Dream (2007) as Brian Blaine
- Speed Racer (2008) as Cruncher Block
- The Best Offer (2013) as Barman
- Cold Skin (2017) as Captain Axel
- Mowgli: Legend of the Jungle (2018) as Wolf Elder (voice)
- The Coldest Game (2019) as Dr. Peter (final film role)

=== TV ===
- Eurocops (1988–1990) as DC George Jackson
- Treasure Island (1990, TV movie) as Black Dog
- Prime Suspect (1991–1995) as Detective Superintendent (later Detective Chief Superintendent) Michael Kernan
- Maigret (1993) as Henri Lautier
- Sharpe's Revenge (1997) as General Calvet
- Hippies (1999)
- The Worst Week of My Life (2004) as Ron Steel

=== Other ===
- Doctor Who: Circular Time (Audio Drama)
