= Dominic Muldowney =

British composer (b. 1952)

Dominic Muldowney (born 19 July 1952 in Southampton) is a British composer.

== Biography ==
Dominic Muldowney studied at the University of Southampton with Jonathan Harvey, at the University of York (with Bernard Rands and David Blake), and privately with Harrison Birtwistle. From 1974 to 1976 he was composer-in-residence to the Southern Arts Association. In 1976 he was invited by Birtwistle to become assistant music director of the Royal National Theatre in London. He succeeded Birtwistle as Music Director in 1981, remaining in that post until 1997.

Muldowney's orchestral music includes a number of concerti (for piano, saxophone, oboe, violin, percussion, trumpet and trombone), many of which explore his fascination with polyrhythms. Other works include Three Pieces for Orchestra (1991), the song cycle Lonely Hearts (1988) and three full-length ballets, including The Brontës (1994). Muldowney’s radio opera The Voluptuous Tango (1996) won the Prix Italia in 1997, and the Gold Award for Best Radio Drama at 1997 Sony Drama Awards, and received its stage premiere in Hoxton New Music Days, London in 2000.

Muldowney has written much music for TV, radio and film including The Ploughman’s Lunch (1983), Nineteen Eighty-Four with Richard Burton (1984), The Ginger Tree (1989), Sharpe (1993), The Peacock Spring (1996), King Lear (1997), Bloody Sunday (2002) and Copenhagen (2002). He has written and arranged for David Bowie and Sting. He is published by Carlin Music Corporation and Faber Music.

Until 2006 Muldowney taught composition at the Royal Academy of Music in London.

== Television and film credits ==
- Betrayal (Spiegel/Pinter - Horizon Films) - Producer: Sam Spiegel - Director: Hugh David Jones
- The Ploughman's Lunch - Director: Richard Eyre
- Loose Connections (Umbrella) - Director: Richard Eyre
- Nineteen Eighty-Four (Virgin Films) - Director: Michael Radford
- Singleton's Pluck - Director: Richard Eyre
- The Beggar's Opera (Alan Ladd Company) - Director: Richard Eyre
- Defence of the Realm (Enigma) - Director: David Drury
- Baal - Director: Alan Clarke - starring David Bowie
- The Black Candle - Director: Roy Battersby
- Tales From Hollywood - Director: Howard Davies
- Black Daisies For The Bride - Director: Peter Symes - Prix Italia Prize Winner
- The Peacock Spring - Director: Christopher Morahan
- Emma - Director: Richard Eyre
- The Moth - Director: Roy Battersby
- The Fix - Director: Paul Greengrass
- Sharpe’s Enemy/Sharpe’s Company/Sharpe’s Honour Sharpe’s Return/Sharpe’s Revenge/Sharpe’s Waterloo Sharpe’s Rifles /Sharpe’s Eagle (Central TV) - Director: Tom Clegg
- Eskimo Day - Director: Piers Haggard
- King Lear - Director: Richard Eyre
- Bloody Sunday (Granada) - Director: Paul Greengrass
- Copenhagen - Director: Howard Davies
- The Blasphemers' Banquet (1989)

== Selected Recordings ==
- Piano Concerto (Peter Donohoe/BBC Symphony Orchestra/Mark Elder) (EMI)
- Saxophone Concerto (John Harle/London Sinfonietta)/Diego Masson (EMI)
- Oboe Concerto (Roy Carter/LSO)/Michael Tilson Thomas (NMC)

== Bibliography ==
- Kennedy, Michael (2006), The Oxford Dictionary of Music, 985 pages, ISBN 0-19-861459-4
- Dominic Muldowney, Opera and the voice: once more with meaning
