= Hugh Fraser (actor) =

English actor and theatre director

- Born: 23 October 1945 (age 80); Westminster, London, England
- Other name: Hugh Frazer
- Occupation: Actor
- Years active: 1956–present
- Spouse: Belinda Lang (m. 1988)
- Children: 1
- Relatives: Jeremy Hawk (father-in-law); Joan Heal (mother-in-law)

Hugh Fraser (born 23 October 1945) is an English actor, theatre director and author. He is best known for his portrayal of Captain Hastings in the television series Agatha Christie's Poirot opposite David Suchet as Hercule Poirot and for his role as the Duke of Wellington (replacing David Troughton) in the Sharpe television series.

Fraser was born in Westminster, but grew up in the Midlands. He studied acting at the Webber Douglas Academy of Dramatic Art and the London Academy of Music and Dramatic Art. Fraser's first big break came after portraying Anthony Eden in the 1978 television series Edward & Mrs. Simpson, with Edward Fox, after which he was frequently cast as upper class or aristocratic characters, such as Mr Talmann in Peter Greenaway's The Draughtsman's Contract.

== Early life ==
Born in Westminster in 1945, but brought up in the Midlands, Hugh Fraser studied acting at the Webber Douglas Academy of Dramatic Art and the London Academy of Music and Dramatic Art. As a member of the folk band Telltale, Hugh co-wrote and performed the theme music for Rainbow, the ITV children's television series.

== Work ==
=== Acting ===
Fraser's first big break came after portraying Anthony Eden in the 1978 television series Edward & Mrs. Simpson, with Edward Fox, after which he was frequently cast as upper class or aristocratic characters, such as Mr Talmann in Peter Greenaway's The Draughtsman's Contract.

He has regularly appeared on film and television and is best known for his portrayals of Captain Hastings in Agatha Christie's Poirot, opposite David Suchet, and of the Duke of Wellington (replacing David Troughton) in Sharpe opposite Sean Bean.

In the 1980s, he appeared in the BBC thriller Edge of Darkness. Fraser can be frequently heard narrating the audiobooks of Christie's works, which are currently published by HarperCollins.

His film credits include Curse of the Pink Panther, 101 Dalmatians and Patriot Games along with his Sharpe co-star Sean Bean. He has also worked in theatre, playing Claudio in Much Ado About Nothing with the Royal Shakespeare Company in 1979. He has guest-starred in the Doctor Who audio dramas Circular Time (2007) and Cradle of the Snake (2010), and in 2003, alongside Martin Shaw in Death in Holy Orders.

Fraser guest starred in a Season 2 episode of the British audio comedy podcast Wooden Overcoats, for which his wife, Belinda Lang, was the narrator.

=== Directing ===
Fraser has been an associate tutor, director, and member of the audition panel at the Royal Academy of Dramatic Art, specialising in Shakespeare. He has also directed several plays, including a production of David Mamet's adaptation of Chekhov's Uncle Vanya, which was staged at Wilton's Music Hall in London in January 2007, with Rachael Stirling as Yelena and the first London production in nearly a century of Kate O'Brien’s play Distinguished Villa at the Finborough Theatre in 2022.

=== Writing ===
Fraser is the author of a series of crime fiction thrillers featuring contract killer Rina Walker. His first novel, Harm, was published in 2015, followed by Threat in 2016. The third in the Rina Walker series, Malice, came out in October 2017 and Stealth, in 2018.

During his appearance on Pointless Celebrities (30 Jan 2021), flute player Hugh explained that he composed the theme melody for the children's programme Rainbow along with other songs for the show and theme tunes for other (unmentioned) TV series.

== Personal life ==
He has been married to the actress Belinda Lang since 1988 and they have one daughter, born in 1990.

== Selected film and television roles ==
Year	Title	Role	Notes
1971	Deviation	Unknown	
1976	The Ritz	Disc Jockey	
1977	The Man in the Iron Mask	Montfleury	TV movie
1977	The Duellists	Unknown	
1978	Edward & Mrs. Simpson	Anthony Eden	TV Mini-Series, 2 episodes
1979	Hanover Street	Captain Harold Lester	
1982	Firefox	Police Inspector Aleksei Tortyev	
1982	Cloud Howe	Robert Colquhoun	TV series, 4 episodes
1982	The Draughtsman's Contract	Mr. Talmann	
1982	The Missionary	Usher At Wedding	
1983	Tales of the Unexpected	Paul Standing	TV series, episode "Clerical Error"
1983	Curse of the Pink Panther	Dr. Arno Stang	
1983	Reilly, Ace of Spies	George Hill	TV Mini-Series, 6 episodes
1985	Edge of Darkness	Robert Bennett	TV Mini-Series, 4 episodes
1987	Murder on the Bluebell Line	Sherlock Holmes	TV series, Documentary
1988	Codename: Kyril	Peter Jackson	TV Mini-Series, 4 episodes
1988	Jack the Ripper	Sir Charles Warren	TV series, 2 episodes
1990	Lorna Doone	James II	TV movie
1992	Patriot Games	Geoffrey Watkins	
1993	Taggart	Bobby Gault	Episode: Gingerbread Part One
1996	101 Dalmatians	Frederick	
2001	The Lost Battalion	General DeCoppet	TV movie
2003	Death in Holy Orders	George Gregory	TV Mini-Series, 2 episodes
2004	The Baby Juice Express	Arthur Burnett, CBE	
2004	The Alan Clark Diaries	Tristan Garel-Jones	TV series, 6 episodes
2004	New Tricks	Paul Adamson	TV series, 1 episode
1994–2006	Sharpe	Duke of Wellington	9 TV Movies
2010	Jackboots on Whitehall	BBC Newsreader / Gaston	Voice
1989–2001, 2013	Agatha Christie's Poirot	Captain Arthur Hastings	TV series, 43 episodes
2016	With Love From... Suffolk	Sat Nav	Voice
