= Malcolm Craddock =

British television producer

- Born: 2 August 1938; London, England
- Died: 15 August 2015 (aged 77)
- Occupation: Film producer
- Years active: 1965–2015

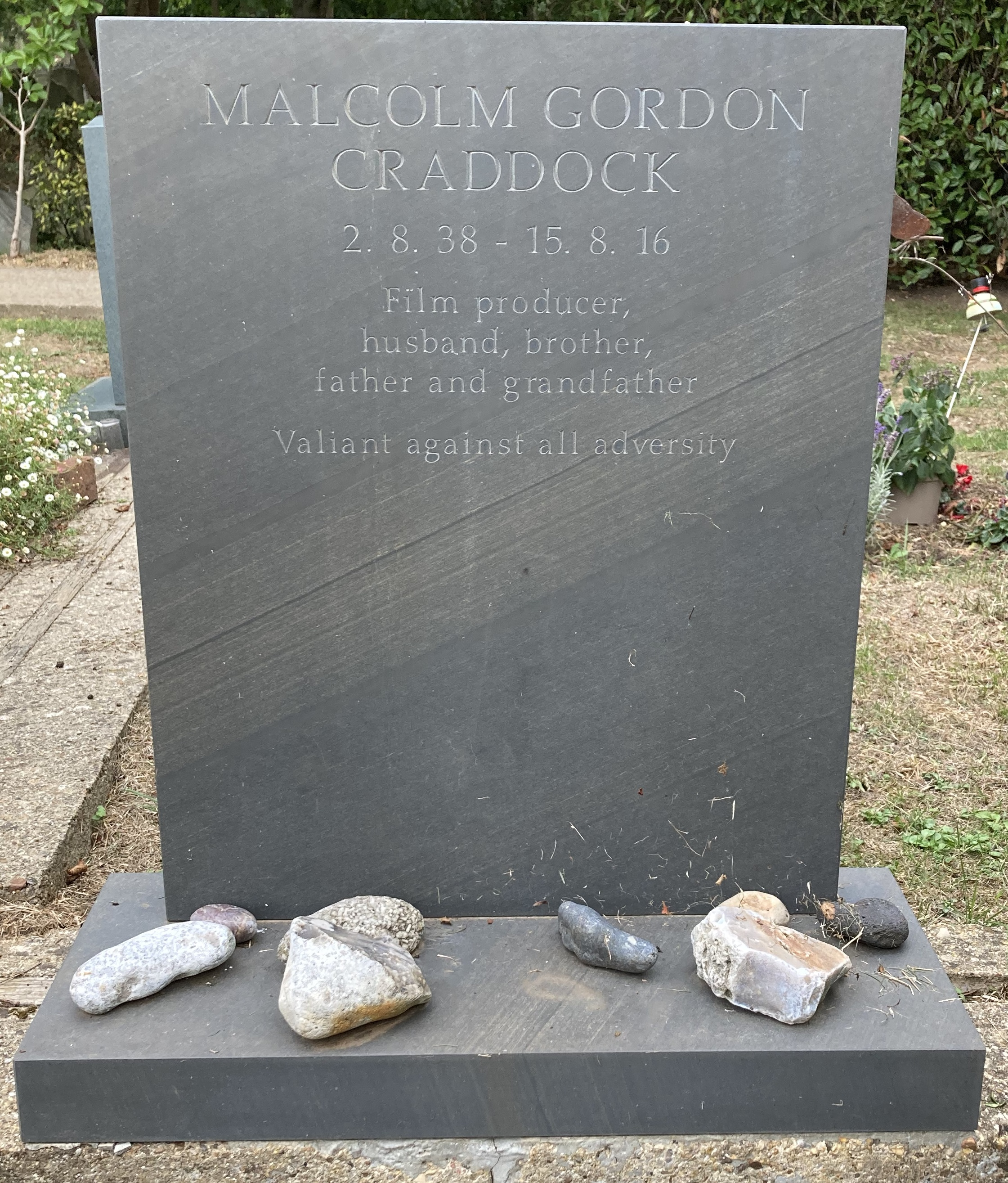
Grave of Malcolm Craddock in Highgate Cemetery

Malcolm Craddock (2 August 1938 – 15 August 2015) was a British producer known for the television series Sharpe.

He is buried on the eastern side of Highgate Cemetery. His gravestone incorrectly states the year of his death as 2016.
