= Tom Clegg (director) =

British TV and film director (1934–2016)

- Born: Thomas Harrison Clegg; 16 October 1934; Lancashire, England
- Died: 24 July 2016 (81)

Thomas Harrison Clegg (16 October 1934 – 24 July 2016) was a British television and film director. He was known as an action director, responsible for many episodes of The Sweeney, its cinema version Sweeney 2 (1978), and Sharpe. Between 1952 and 1954, he performed national service in the Royal Air Force.

== Selected filmography ==
Television

- Scotland Yard: The Stateless Man (1955) as Fenton
- Special Branch (1973–74)
- Space: 1999 (1975–77)
- The Sweeney (1975–78)
- A Captain's Tale (1982)
- Frederick Forsyth Presents (1989 and 1990)
- Sharpe (1993–2008)
- Bravo Two Zero (1999)
- Adventure Inc. (2002–2003)
- Rosemary & Thyme (2003)

Film

- Love Is a Splendid Illusion (1970)
- Sweeney 2 (1978)
- McVicar (1980)
- G'olé! (1983)
- The Inside Man (1984)
- Any Man's Death (1990)
