= Jason Salkey =

British actor (born 1962)

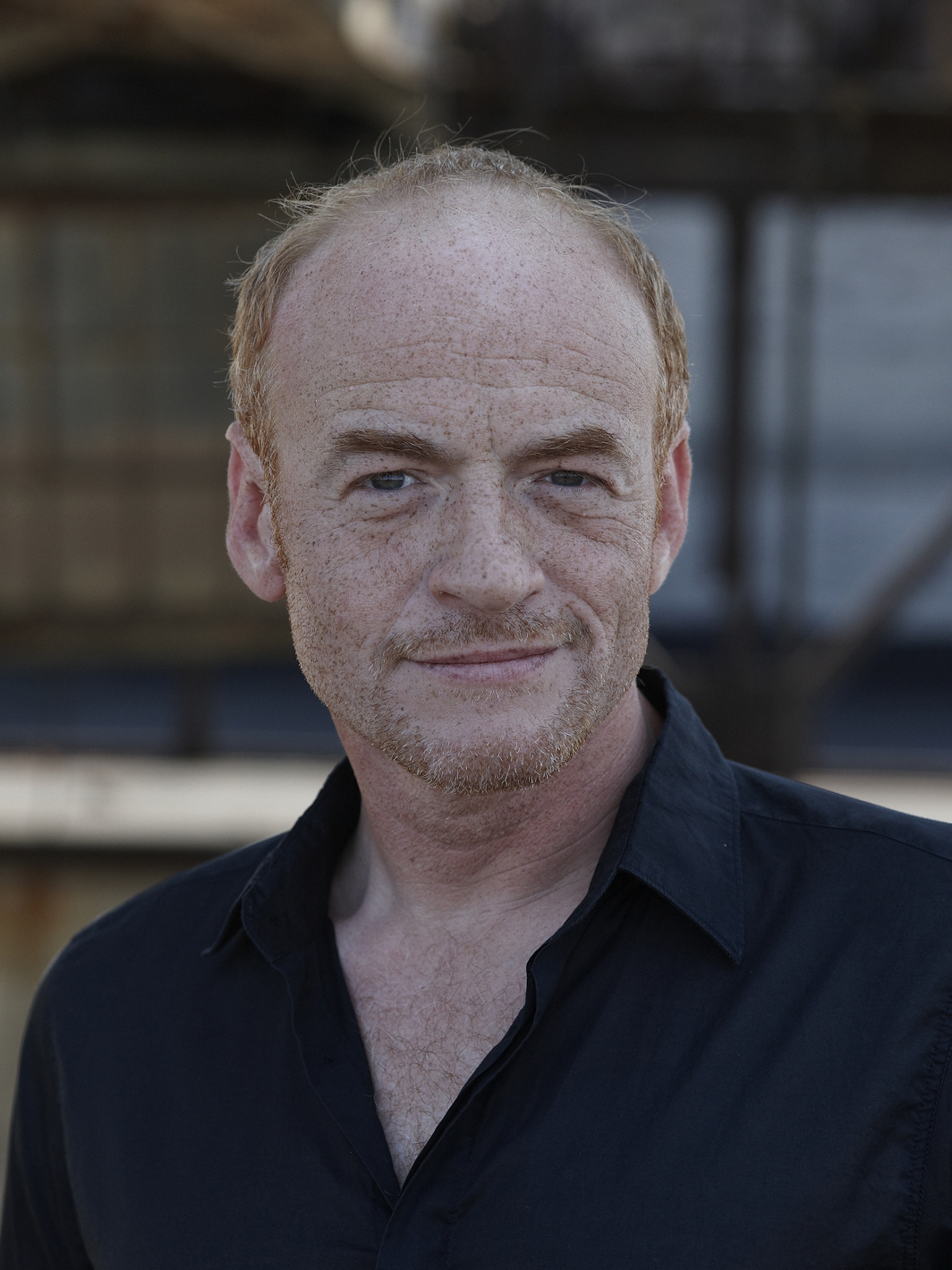
- Born: 24 April 1962 (age 64); London, England
- Years active: 1989–present
- Spouse: Natasha Salkey
- Parent(s): Patricia (née Verden) and Andrew Salkey
- Website: http://www.riflemanharris.co.uk/

Jason Salkey (born 24 April 1962) is an English actor, best known for playing Harris, the "educated rifleman", in the television series Sharpe. Salkey has also published a book and video diaries about working in Sharpe alongside Sean Bean.

== Early life and education ==
He was born in London, England. His father was the noted writer, Andrew Salkey. Jason Salkey attended Holland Park School in England before moving to Amherst, Massachusetts, where he graduated from Amherst Regional High School in 1980. He then earned his degree in Acting and Directing from Hampshire College in Amherst. While in school, he became a skilled Frisbee player and eventually went on to become the two-time European Freestyle Frisbee champion.

== Career ==
Salkey produced and released, along with Drew Sutton, ten DVD video diaries of his time working on the Sharpe series entitled, The Video Diaries of Rifleman Harris. His other movie roles include: Memphis Belle (1990), The Russia House (1990), The Fifth Element (1997), FairyTale: A True Story (1997), The Turn of the Screw (1999), In America (2002) and About a Boy (2002). The actor has had multiple appearances on British television. Salkey also starred in an advertisement for Miller Lite in the UK in 1988, with "He Ain't Heavy, He's My Brother" as the ad's theme. The song reached number 1 in the UK charts in 1988, 19 years after its original release, as a result of the ad's success.

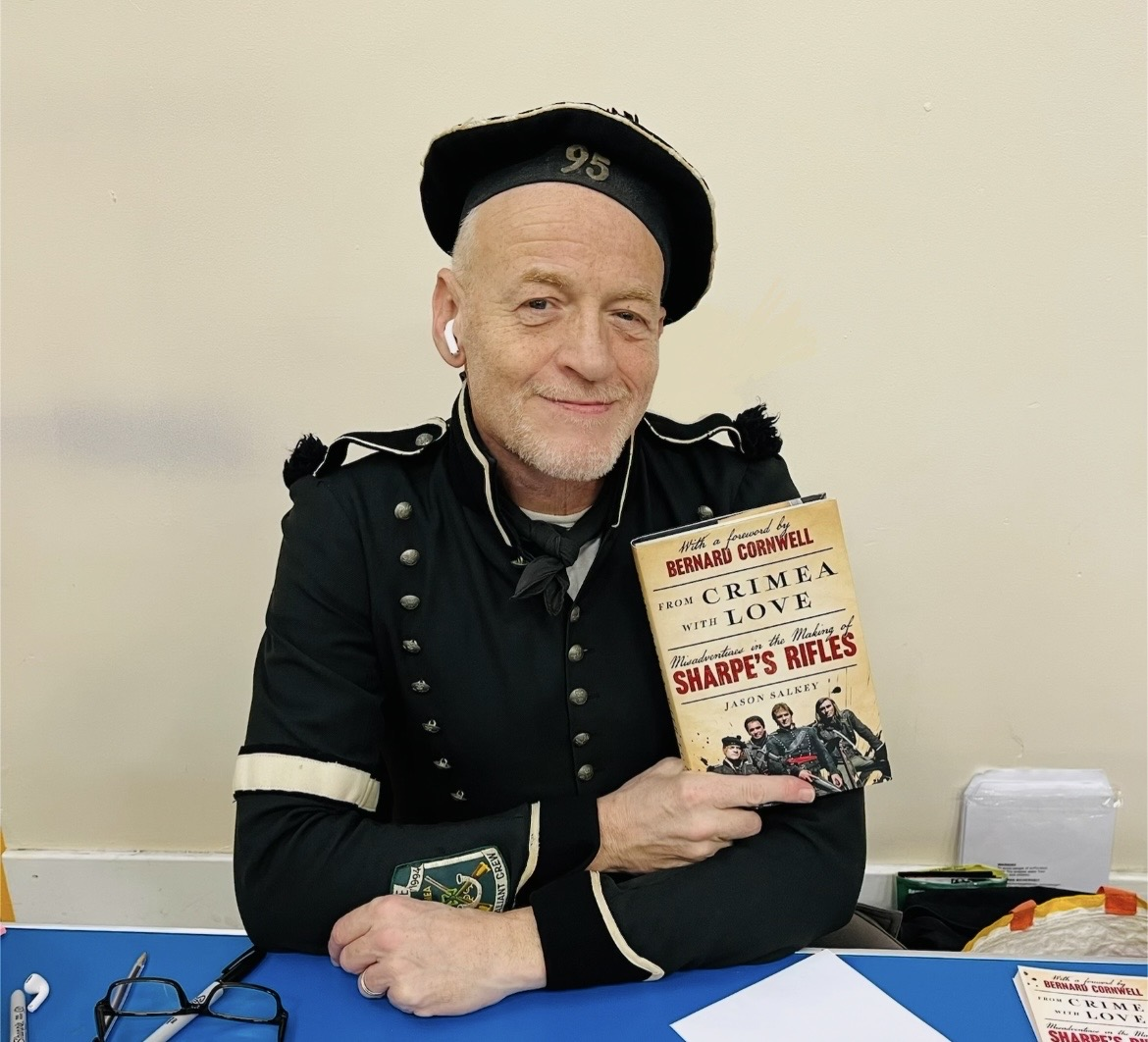
Salkey at a signing in costume in 2026

Salkey often attends history shows to promote his Sharpe merchandise and meet his fans.

In 2021 Salkey released his first book, From Crimea with Love: Misadventures in the Making of Sharpe's Rifles, which details his experiences filming Sharpe.

== Personal life ==
Salkey is married to Natasha. The actor met her while she was the Ukrainian set translator during the time the production of Sharpe was filmed in Ukraine. They have a son.
