= Daragh O'Malley =

Irish actor, director, producer (b. 1954)

- Born: 25 May 1954 (age 72); Dublin, Ireland
- Citizenship: Ireland
- Occupation: Actor/Producer
- Years active: 1977–present
- Spouse: Gabrielle Leavy (Deceased April 2023)
- Parents: Donogh O'Malley (father); Hilda Moriarty (mother)
- Awards: MTA Award - Drama League Award School = Terenure College, Dublin

Daragh Gerard Marion O'Malley (born 25 May 1954) is an Irish actor, director, and producer. He is best known for his portrayal of Patrick Harper in the television series Sharpe (1993–2008) co-starring opposite Sean Bean. He has appeared in a number of other films, major television shows, and stage productions throughout his career in the UK and in the US.

== Career ==
O'Malley trained at LAMDA - London Academy of Music and Dramatic Art. Following drama school O'Malley was a founding member of Common Stock Theatre Company which took theatre to the poorer quarters of the East End of London. A fellow founding member of Common Stock was Dame Harriet Walter

He began his career with roles in Crossroads (147 episodes) on ITV and then roles in the films The Long Good Friday and Withnail and I. O'Malley went on to appear in over 100 UK and US television series, including Tales of the Unexpected, Waking The Dead, Silent Witness, Wire In The Blood and Vera, as well as appearing in TV roles in Longitude, Cleopatra, and The Magnificent Seven. O'Malley played Irish explorer Tom Crean in the eight-part television series The Last Place on Earth and the crooked lawyer Nick Varago in the LucasArts multi million selling interactive game Grim Fandango.

In 2011, O'Malley shifted his focus back to the stage, appearing in productions in both the US and the UK. In recent years O'Malley has appeared in over a dozen stage productions, including a revival of Dancing at Lughnasa, where he played Father Jack, which was nominated for an MTA Best Production Award. He followed this by playing John Rainey in a London revival of Irvine's Mixed Marriage, which received positive reviews and which The Guardians Michael Billington called " the most compelling play in London" . In 2014, O'Malley appeared as Big Daddy in a production of Cat on a Hot Tin Roof at The Royal Exchange Theatre Manchester, for which he was nominated for an MTA Best Actor award. UK's The Stage selected O'Malley's performance as one of the Top Five Performances in UK theatre in 2014.

In 1968 O'Malley's father, Donogh, as Minister for Education introduced Free Secondary Education in Ireland which is credited with the subsequent massive upsurge in the Irish economy.

O'Malley's mother, Hilda, was the inspiration for the poem and song On Raglan Roadand 13 other Kavanagh poems and several essays including Stars in Muddy Puddles and The Lay of the Crooked Knight.

== Awards ==
O'Malley's production of The Rocky Horror Show in Dublin won numerous awards, including a Best Production Jacob's Award. The show's playwright, Richard O'Brien, described O'Malley's Irish production as "without doubt, the sexiest version of my show ever produced."

In Los Angeles, O'Malley won a Drama-Logue Best Actor Award for his 1998 performance as Sweeney in Patrick Marber's Dealers Choice at The Mark Taper Forum.

O'Malley also won a BANFF TV Award for a one-off episode of the BBC Series Doctors, a two-handed episode in which he appeared with actor Christopher Timothy.

In 2015 O'Malley was nominated for several awards for his performance as Big Daddy in The Royal Exchange,Manchester, production of "Cat on a Hot Tin Roof". The Stage listed O'Malley's performance as one of "The Top Ten Performances in British Theatre in 2014"

O'Malley was recognized by the industry being nominated for the 2019, 2022 and 2023 Offies for Best Actor.

== Charity work ==
O'Malley founded The Sharpe's Children Foundation, a charity designed to fight poverty with education and take orphaned and destitute children off the streets of the Third World and into residential primary education. The SCF was launched at Apsley House, London, home of the Duke of Wellington, in October 2010. Team India, sponsored by The Sharpe's Children Foundation and made up of children who lived in railway carriages at Delhi Railway Station and who played football in the railway yards, won The Street Children's World Cup in Durban, South Africa. The Sharpe's Children Foundation was chosen as World Charity of The Year in 2012 by Intellectual Property Magazine and was integrated with The Consortium for Street Children later that year.

== Filmography ==
- Crossroads (1977–1978 and 1981, TV Series) as Pat Grogan
- Play for Today (1978, BBC TV Series) as Face
- The Long Good Friday (1980) as 2nd Irishman
- Tales of the Unexpected (1983, TV Series) as Jimmy
- Cal (1984) as Scarfaced Policeman
- Blue Money (1985, TV Movie) as McMordie
- The Last Place on Earth (1985, TV Mini-Series) as P.O. Crean
- Truckers (1987, TV Series) as Bedrock
- Withnail and I (1987) as Irishman
- Act of Betrayal (1988, TV Mini-Series) as Bearded IRA Man
- A Day in Summer (1989, TV Movie) as Frederick Dolan
- Shoot to Kill (1990, TV Movie) as Constable "1".
- Connemara (1990) as Frocin
- Diary of a Madman (1990) as Orderly
- Sharpe (1993-2008, TV Series) as Sgt. Maj. Patrick Harper
- Texas (1994, TV Movie) as MacNab
- Cutthroat Island (1995) as Bourke (uncredited)
- Shaughnessy (1996, TV Movie)
- Grim Fandango (1998, Video Game) as Nick Virago (voice)
- The Magnificent Seven (1998, CBS TV Series) as Captain Francis Riley
- Cleopatra (1999, Hallmark TV Mini-Series) as Ahenobarbus
- Vendetta (1999, HBO Feature TV Movie) as Dominic O'Malley
- Longitude (2000, TV Movie) as Captain Bourke
- McCready and Daughter (2000, TV Movie) as Gerry Garaghty
- Rebel Heart (2001, TV Mini-Series) as James Grace
- On Home Ground (2001-2002, TV Series) as Barry King
- The Bombmaker (2001, Sky Movies, TV Movie) as Mick Canning
- Puckoon (2002, Feature) as Father Rudden
- Doctors (2003, Soap Opera) Winner Banff TV Award
- In Deep (2003, TV Series) as Jake Scanlan
- Silent Witness (2004, TV Series) as Walter Shanley
- Wire in the Blood (2005, TV Series) as Michael Thompson
- Waking The Dead (2007, TV Series) as Sean Killigan Snr
- Heroes and Villains (2008, BBC Drama TV Series documentary) as William
- The Royal (2009, ITV Series) as Niall Donahue
- Camelot (2011, TV Series) as Leodegrance
- Vera (2015 ITV Series) as DCI John Warrick
- Doctors (2023, TV series) as Brendan Athy
