= Harvey (rapper) =

British rapper (born 1979)

MC Harvey
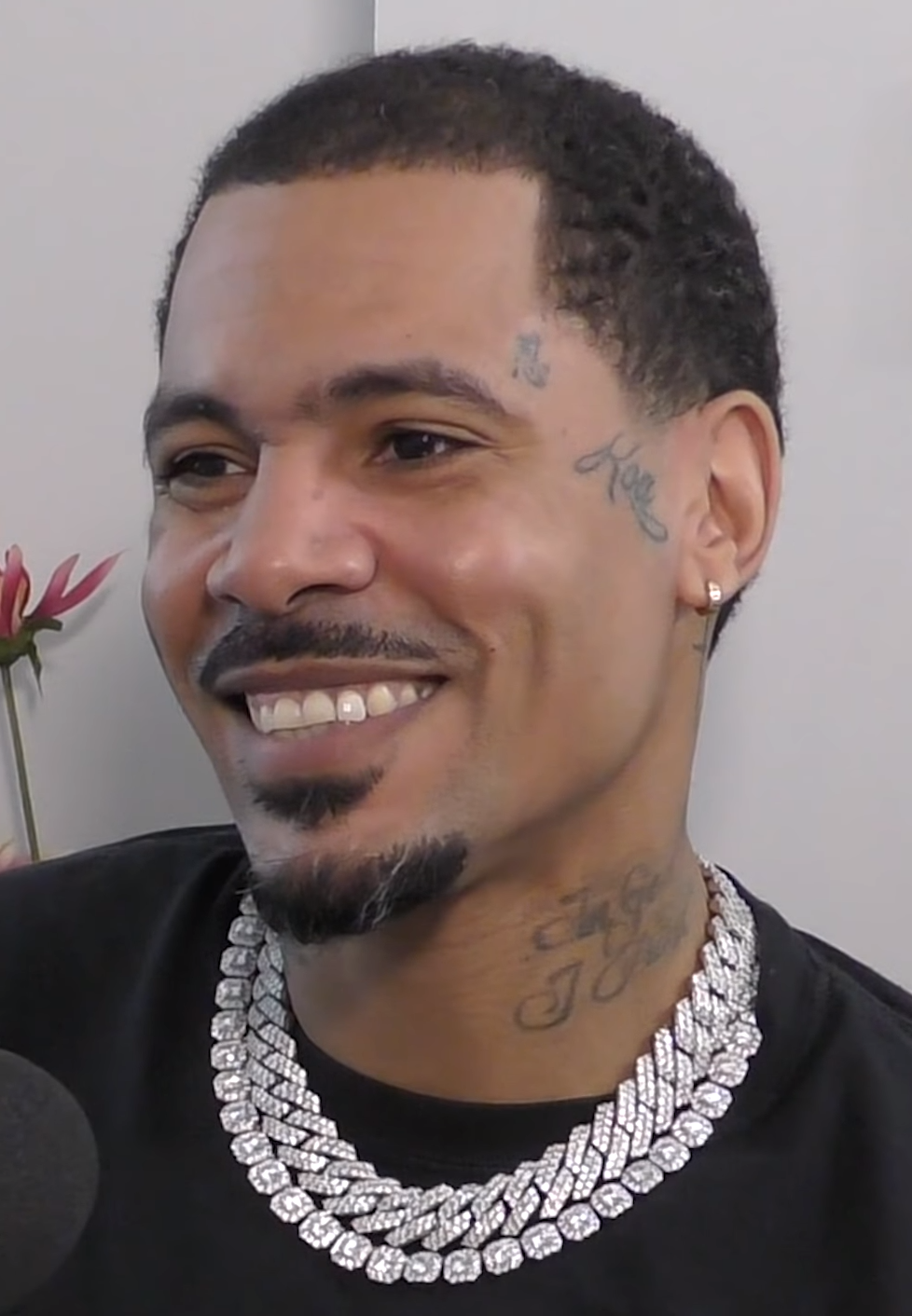
- Harvey in 2021

Background information
- Born: Michael Harvey Jr. 1 May 1979 (age 47); Plymouth, Devon, England
- Genres: UK garage; hip hop
- Occupations: Rapper; MC
- Years active: 2001–present
- Label: Relentless
- Spouse(s): Alesha Dixon (m. 2005; div. 2006) Ghamzeh Mahdizadeh (m. 2015, separated)

Michael Harvey Jr. (born 1 May 1979), better known as MC Harvey or simply Harvey, is a British rapper. He first came to fame in the early 2000s as a member of rap group So Solid Crew before then pursuing a solo career in 2008. In 2012, he was a contestant on Celebrity Big Brother 10.

== Early life ==
Harvey was born in Plymouth, Devon, the son of Michael Harvey, a bodybuilder and former Gladiators participant "Bullit". Harvey (Sr.) owns a record label, Artiste Promotion & Management (APM), to which Harvey was once signed.

== Music career ==
=== So Solid Crew ===
Growing up on the Plough Road area of Battersea in South London, Harvey was one of the founder members of UK garage collective So Solid Crew. So Solid Crew's first album They Don't Know was released in October 2001, followed by a remix album entitled Fuck It in December 2001. They also had tracks on the UK garage CD series Pure Garage. In 2002 Harvey and the rest of So Solid Crew were the subject of the Channel 4 television documentary, This Is So Solid, directed and narrated by David Upshal. This was later released on DVD by Universal along with a live performance.

=== Solo career ===
After leaving the group, Harvey released his first solo single, "Get Up and Move", which went into the charts at number 24. His debut album Back to the Beginning was released in 2008 and produced singles "Excuse Me Miss", which featured Romeo and Asher D, and "If I Was Your Man", featuring Nathan. The album failed to chart.

It 2011 Harvey released Hot Gyal Ft. Mista Brown and Gyptian, which was a big hit on the clubscene. In 2012, he released another song called "Finally Along" with Lady Lesharr and former footballer Leon McKenzie; a new album is to follow. The same night he entered Big Brother he released a new mixtape that is available to download from his Twitter.

== Other ventures ==
=== Acting ===
He made his theatre début in London's West End in the musical Daddy Cool in 2006.

He joined the line-up of Angie Le Mar's play The Brothers at the Hackney Empire in 2008. The play was broadcast on MTV Base. He also had a hit show on MTV Base called The Young Gods of Comedy. He visited Robertsbridge Community College as a motivational speaker about the music industry, singing songs and inviting students to show their rapping skills.

He appeared in the 2010 British gangster film The Big I Am as Robbo. In 2011, Harvey starred in Jason Barrett's British feature film The Naked Poet, playing Richard.

=== Television ===
Harvey has also appeared on reality TV shows The Games on Channel Four in 2003 (which he won) and several series of The Match on Sky One. He has also appeared on Never Mind the Buzzcocks, Newsnight and has hosted the dance competition Bump 'n Grind on the youth cable channel Trouble and Footballers' Pads on Sky One.

In 2007, Harvey appeared on The Weakest Link Music Extravaganza Special, and was the fourth contestant voted off. In 2008, he participated in Channel 4 show Celebrity Come Dine with Me, along with Jonathan Ansell, Tamara Beckwith and Lynsey de Paul, finishing joint first with Ansell. In summer 2012 he was a contestant on Celebrity Big Brother 10, Harvey made the final on 7 September 2012 Day 24 after never facing eviction during his entire stay within the Big Brother house. He was the first to leave the house on finale night finishing in 6th place.

=== Football ===
Harvey supports Liverpool and has also been a non-league footballer. He has played for AFC Wimbledon, Aldershot Town and Lewes. He was signed by the Conference South side St Albans City in 2007 but left because of work commitments.

== Personal life ==
Harvey married singer Alesha Dixon in June 2005. In November 2006, the couple split following Harvey's affair with singer Javine Hylton. He would later star with Hylton in a West End version of Daddy Cool. Hylton gave birth to their daughter, Angel Hylton Harvey, in February 2008. They later split up amid allegations of his infidelity. On 8 August 2015 Harvey married dancer Ghamzeh Mahdizadeh near their home in Windsor, after dating for five years. Their daughter Persia Love Mahdizadeh was born on 1 January 2016. It was reported in February 2016 that Harvey had left Mahdizadeh for Elarica Johnson just two weeks after their wedding. In April 2016, he was jailed for ten weeks for driving without a licence or insurance.

== Discography ==
=== So Solid Crew ===
- They Don't Know (2001)
- 2nd Verse (2003)

=== Solo albums ===
- Back to the Beginning (2008)

== Filmography ==
=== Film ===
- Out for a Kill (2003)
- The Big I Am (2010)
- The Naked Poet (2011)
- All things to all men (2012)

=== Television ===
- Harvey at IMDb

=== Video games ===
- FIFA Street (2005)

== Theatre ==
- Daddy Cool by Frank Farian (2006)
- The Brothers by Angie Le Mar (2008)
