= List of UK R&B Singles Chart number ones of 2003 =

The UK R&B Chart is a weekly chart that ranks the 40 biggest-selling singles and albums that are classified in the R&B genre in the United Kingdom. The chart is compiled by the Official Charts Company, and is based on physical and other physical formats. This is a list of the UK's biggest R&B hits of 2003.

== Number ones ==
Key
†	Best-selling R&B single of the year

Issue date	Single	Artist
5 January	"Lose Yourself"	Eminem
12 January	"Lose Yourself"	Eminem
19 January	"Mundian To Bach Ke"	Panjabi MC
26 January	"'03 Bonnie & Clyde"	Jay-Z featuring Beyoncé Knowles
2 February	"Stole"	Kelly Rowland
9 February	"Cry Me a River"	Justin Timberlake
16 February	"Cry Me a River"	Justin Timberlake
23 February	"Cry Me a River"	Justin Timberlake
2 March	"Cry Me a River"	Justin Timberlake
9 March	"Work It"	Nelly featuring Justin Timberlake
16 March	"All I Have"	Jennifer Lopez featuring LL Cool J
23 March	"Scandalous"	Mis-Teeq
30 March	"Scandalous"	Mis-Teeq
6 April	"In da Club"	50 Cent
13 April	"In da Club"	50 Cent
20 April	"In da Club"	50 Cent
27 April	"All Over"	Lisa Maffia
4 May	"Rise & Fall"	Craig David featuring Sting
11 May ^{[a]}	"Ignition (Remix)"	R. Kelly
18 May ^{[a]}	"Ignition (Remix)"	R. Kelly
25 May ^{[a]}	"Ignition (Remix)"	R. Kelly
2 June ^{[a]}	"Ignition (Remix)"	R. Kelly
9 June	"Ignition (Remix)"	R. Kelly
16 June	"Ignition (Remix)"	R. Kelly
23 June	"No Letting Go"	Wayne Wonder
30 June	"No Letting Go"	Wayne Wonder
6 July	"No Letting Go"	Wayne Wonder
13 July	"Business"	Eminem
20 July	"No Letting Go"	Wayne Wonder
27 July	"No Letting Go"	Wayne Wonder
3 August ^{[a]}	Breathe"	Blu Cantrell featuring Sean Paul
10 August ^{[a]}	Breathe"	Blu Cantrell featuring Sean Paul
17 August ^{[a]}	Breathe"	Blu Cantrell featuring Sean Paul
24 August ^{[a]}	Breathe"	Blu Cantrell featuring Sean Paul
31 August	Breathe"	Blu Cantrell featuring Sean Paul
7 September ^{[a]}	"Where Is the Love?" †	The Black Eyed Peas
14 September ^{[a]}	"Where Is the Love?" †	The Black Eyed Peas
21 September ^{[a]}	"Where Is the Love?" †	The Black Eyed Peas
28 September ^{[a]}	"Where Is the Love?" †	The Black Eyed Peas
5 October ^{[a]}	"Where Is the Love?" †	The Black Eyed Peas
12 October ^{[a]}	"Where Is the Love?" †	The Black Eyed Peas
19 October	"Turn Me On"	Kevin Lyttle
26 October ^{[a]}	"Be Faithful"	Fatman Scoop featuring the Crooklyn Clan
2 November ^{[a]}	"Be Faithful"	Fatman Scoop featuring the Crooklyn Clan
9 November	"Be Faithful"	Fatman Scoop featuring the Crooklyn Clan
16 November	"Hey Ya!"	Outkast
23 November	"50/50"	Lemar
30 November	"One More Chance"	Michael Jackson
7 December	"Shut Up"	The Black Eyed Peas
14 December	"Shut Up"	The Black Eyed Peas
21 December	"Shut Up"	The Black Eyed Peas
28 December	"Shut Up"	The Black Eyed Peas

== Notes ==
- ^{a} - The single was simultaneously number one on the UK Singles Chart.

== See also ==
- List of UK Dance Singles Chart number ones of 2003
- List of UK Independent Singles Chart number ones of 2003
- List of UK Rock & Metal Singles Chart number ones of 2003
- List of UK R&B Albums Chart number ones of 2003
