= First Lady (album) =

Studio album by Lisa Maffia
- Released: 22 September 2003
- Label: Epic

Singles from First Lady
- 1. "All Over"; 2. "In Love"; 3. "Women of the World"; 4. "Down"

First Lady is the only album by English singer and So Solid Crew member Lisa Maffia. It was released in the UK on 22 September 2003 and internationally on 6 January 2004. The first single, "All Over", was released in the UK on 24 April 2003.

== Track listing ==
1. "Swiss Intro"
2. "All Over" (featuring JD, Megaman and Swiss)
3. "Women of the World" (featuring Thug Angel)
4. "Down" (featuring JD)
5. "Wrong Guys" (featuring Thug Angel and Smetz)
6. "So Solid Party" (featuring Tiger S and Face)
7. "JD Interlude"
8. "In Love"
9. "Life" (featuring Face)
10. "City Life" (featuring Face)
11. "Super Freak" (featuring Swiss)
12. "Always Be Your Angel"
13. "Out of My Life"
14. "Night Crawler" (featuring Megaman)
15. "Outro (Slowdown Zone)" (featuring Romeo, Thug Angel and Swiss)
16. "All Over" (Remix) (Japanese bonus track)
17. "In Love" (Remix) (Japanese bonus track)

== Charts ==
Chart	Peak position
UK Albums Chart	44
