= They Don't Know About Us =

They Don't Know About Us may refer to:

- "They Don't Know About Us", a song by One Direction from Take Me Home, 2012
- "They Don't Know About Us", a song by Victoria Duffield from Shut Up and Dance, 2012

== See also ==
- They Don't Know (disambiguation)
- "They Don't Care About Us", a song by Michael Jackson, 1996
- "They Don't Know 'Bout Us", a song by BTS from Arirang, 2026
