= They know =

They Know is an upcoming American horror film. The title may also refer to:

- "Dey Know", 2007 hip-hop song by Shawty Lo

== See also ==
- They Don't Know (disambiguation)
