= S. I. Martin =

British author, historian, journalist and teacher

S. I. Martin (born 24 April 1961) is a British author, historian, journalist and teacher, specialising in Black British history and literature. He wrote Britain's Slave Trade for Channel 4 Books to accompany the channel's television documentary Windrush, a novel, Incomparable World, charting the progress of three black exiles living in 18th-century London, and has written works of fiction for children to widen the consciousness and knowledge of the slave trade. Aside from authorship, Martin actively promotes the knowledge of Black British history through his work with London schools, borough councils, English Heritage, the National Maritime Museum, the Museum of London, the Museum of London Docklands, the Imperial War Museum and the Public Record Office.

Martin is a patron of Humanists UK.

== Life ==
Steven Ian Martin was born on 24 April 1961 in Bedford, England, his parents settled having arrived in Britain from Antigua in 1954, and Martin received his education at Bedford Modern School.

Martin's work is focused on Black British history and literature. In particular he wished to redress the lack of published history on the presence of black people in Britain before the arrival of HMT Windrush in 1948. His subsequent journalism, teaching, writing and scholarly work has addressed that lacuna, including his walking tours of London demonstrating "500 Years of Black London".

Martin's first novel, Incomparable World (1996), charts the fate of three black exiles living in 18th-century London. His work of non-fiction, Britain's Slave Trade, was written for Channel 4 to tie in with its four-part documentary series, Windrush, produced by Trevor Phillips.

In 2007 Martin's novel for children, Jupiter Williams, was published. It tells a contradictory tale of privilege and dispossession of a boy who lives at the African Academy in Clapham, London in 1800, the son of a wealthy Sierra Leone family. Cesar Picton is a character in the novel. The sequel, Jupiter Amidships, was published in 2009 and follows Jupiter and his brother who are trapped by a pressgang before boarding their home ship to Sierra Leone.

Aside from authorship, Martin actively promotes the knowledge of Black British history through his work with London schools, English Heritage, borough councils, the National Maritime Museum, the Museum of London, the Museum of London Docklands, the Imperial War Museum, the Public Record Office and the Black Cultural Archives.

Martin lives and works in South London.

== Selected bibliography ==
- Incomparable World: A Novel. Published by Quartet Books, London, 1996
- Britain's Slave Trade, London: Channel 4 Books, 1999
- Jupiter Williams, London: Hodder Children's Books, 2007
- Jupiter Amidships, London: Hodder Children's, 2009.
