= Carl Morgan =

English music producer and murderer

- Born: 1981 (age 44–45)
- Origin: Winstanley Estate, Battersea, London, England
- Genres: UK garage; grime; hip hop
- Occupations: Producer, rapper

Carl Morgan (born 1981) is a former record producer of the rap group So Solid Crew. In October 2005, he was sentenced to 30 years for murder.

He was tried before a jury for the murder of 24-year-old Colin Scarlett in Tooting, South London, in November 2004. Colin Scarlett, the partner of Morgan's ex-girlfriend (who has two children by Morgan), had beaten Morgan up earlier on the day of the murder. Morgan returned with a gun and shot Scarlett.

The judge recommended that Morgan should spend at least 30 years in prison before being considered for parole, a recommendation that is expected to keep him behind bars until at least 2034 and the age of 53.

The jury failed to reach a verdict on the same charge faced by So Solid Crew rapper Dwayne Vincent ('Megaman'), who faced a retrial in March 2006 where the jury was discharged before a verdict could be reached. A second retrial began in September 2006, and on 28 September Vincent was found not guilty of murder at the Old Bailey.

Morgan appeared in So Solid Crew's video for the track "21 Seconds".
