= Broken Silence =

Broken Silence may refer to:

- Broken Silence (album), by Foxy Brown, 2001
- "Broken Silence" (song), a 2003 single by So Solid Crew
- Broken Silence (1996 film), a 1996 film by Wolfgang Panzer
- Broken Silence (2001 film), a 2001 Spanish drama film
- Broken Silence, a 2007 album by RBX
