= All Over (song) =

2003 single by Lisa Maffia

Single by Lisa Maffia

from the album First Lady
- B-side: "Nightcrawler"; "Out of My Life"
- Released: 21 April 2003
- Length: 3:43
- Label: Independiente
- Songwriters: JD, Lisa Maffia, Swiss, Megaman
- Producer: JD

Lisa Maffia singles chronology
"All Over" (2003)	"In Love" (2003)

"All Over" is the debut solo single of So Solid Crew member Lisa Maffia, released as the lead single from her first solo album, First Lady (2003), on 21 April 2003. In the United Kingdom, the song spent 12 weeks on the UK Singles Chart, peaking at number two. It was the 85th-best-selling single of 2003 in the UK. Worldwide, "All Over" reached number 23 in New Zealand and peaked inside the top 50 in Australia and the Netherlands.

== Track listings ==
UK CD1

1. "All Over" (edit version)
2. "All Over" (full length version)
3. "Nightcrawler"
4. "All Over" (video)

UK CD2

1. "All Over" (edit version)
2. "All Over" (remix)
3. "Out of My Life"

UK 12-inch single

A1. "All Over" (full length version)
A2. "All Over" (remix)
B1. "Nightcrawler"

European CD single

1. "All Over" (edit version)
2. "All Over" (Jiggy Joint re-edited video)

European maxi-CD single

1. "All Over" (Jiggy Joint radio remix)
2. "All Over" (edit version)
3. "All Over" (remix)
4. "All Over" (Jiggy Joint re-edited video)

Australian CD single

1. "All Over" (edit version)
2. "All Over" (full length version)
3. "All Over" (remix)
4. "All Over" (Jiggy Joint remix)
5. "Nightcrawler"

== Charts ==
=== Weekly charts ===
Chart (2003)	Peak position
Australia (ARIA)	42
Australian Urban (ARIA)	13
Belgium (Ultratip Bubbling Under Flanders)	8
Europe (Eurochart Hot 100)	11
Netherlands (Dutch Top 40 Tipparade)	4
Netherlands (Single Top 100)	42
New Zealand (Recorded Music NZ)	23
Scotland Singles (OCC)	9
UK Singles (OCC)	2
UK Hip Hop/R&B (OCC)	1

=== Year-end charts ===
Chart (2003)	Position
UK Singles (OCC)	85

== Release history ==
Region	Date	Format(s)	Label(s)	Ref.
United Kingdom	21 April 2003	12-inch vinyl; CD	Independiente	
Australia	2 June 2003	CD	Sony Music Australia	
