= Daddy Cool (musical) =

2006 stage musical

- Music: Boney M. Frank Farian
- Lyrics: Boney M. Frank Farian
- Basis: Frank Farian Jukebox musical
- Productions: 2006 West End; 2007 World Tour; 2011/2012 Dutch tour

Daddy Cool is a musical based upon the works of Boney M. and other Frank Farian-produced artists. It premiered in the West End in 2006, followed by UK and international tours.

The musical tells the story of Sunny, a young man who lives for his music. Caught up in local rivalry between East and West London crews, he meets and falls in love with Rose, daughter of the East End's notorious club owner Ma Baker. Echoing Romeo and Juliet, the lovers' relationship fuels the hostility between the two gangs, leaving their families face to face past secrets and forcing them to confront their future.

== Productions ==
Daddy Cool was originally due to open on 16 May 2006, following previews from 26 April; however, this date was later put back until 2 May 2006, keeping the premiere the same, but allowing for more creative time. In March 2006, the producers, Frank Farian and Robert Mackintosh (brother of Sir Cameron Mackintosh), announced that the show had been delayed indefinitely, with the earliest opening in September 2006.

The show premiered on 21 September 2006 at London's newly refurbished Shaftesbury Theatre, following previews from 15 August 2006. It closed on 17 February 2007.

A tour opened in Berlin, Germany, on 26 April 2007, where it played for two months. The show toured in Denmark during February 2009.

The UK national tour ran from 10 to 14 June 2008 at the Aberdeen Arts Centre.

The musical has also been produced in the Netherlands (September 2011 to January 2012), Spain (July 2012), and Switzerland (November 2015 to January 2016).

== Synopsis ==
Act I

Sunny lives on the islands with his Grandma Ella, who receives a letter from Sunny's mother Pearl in England, telling them that she wants him home. Young Sunny is hostile towards her at first, and begins to feel the music, bursting into song during church.

Years later, Sunny is part of the Subsonics, a music crew led by Shake. At a recording session with Rasputin, they run into The Blades, another music crew, led by Benny Baker, Ma Baker's son. Later at a launch party for Asia Blue, Benny's girlfriend, Sunny and Rose meet. When Ma Baker finds out her daughter is seeing Sunny, she goes to visit him, and gives him a coat once owned by his father, Johnny Cool. Upon asking his mother about it, Pearl explains how Ma Baker was Johnny's dance partner—and took her away from her when she was pregnant with him.

Act II

After a music battle between the Subsonics and the Blades, Shake is shot by Benny, but when Sunny gets the opportunity to get payback, he does not take it, instantly being disowned by the Subsonics, and subsequently breaking up with Rose. Rasputin tells him to make it up with Rose, but he is arrested, accused of shooting Shake, as Benny and Ma have set him up.

As the Notting Hill Carnival takes place, Shake, Rose, Asia, and Sunny appear. It is revealed that someone has given evidence against Benny over the shooting—Benny's best friend, Naz.

== Musical numbers ==
Act I

- "Hooray! Hooray! It's a Holi-Holiday" (Boney M.) – Ensemble, Young Sunny, Janet, Zadie
- "Mary's Boy Child" (Boney M.) – Pastor, Choir, Young Sunny, Ensemble
- "Girl You Know It's True" (Milli Vanilli) – The Subsonics
- "Take the Heat off Me" (Boney M.) – Ma Baker, Asia Blue, Janet, Ensemble
- "Ma Baker" (Boney M.) – Rose, Sandra
- "Sweet Dreams" (La Bouche) – Asia Blue, Ensemble
- "Be My Lover" (La Bouche) – Asia Blue, Ensemble
- "Baby Don't Forget My Number" (Milli Vanilli) – Sunny, Rose
- "Brown Girl in the Ring" (Boney M.) – Sunny, Janet, Ensemble
- "Sunny" (Boney M.) – Rose, Ensemble
- "Baby Do You Wanna Bump" (Boney M.) – Ensemble
- "Daddy Cool" (Boney M.) – Janet, Ensemble
- "One Way Ticket" (Eruption) – Young Pearl

Act II

- "Rasputin" (Boney M.) – Ezra & Alani
- "Gotta Go Home" (Boney M.) – The Blade Squad
- "Painter Man" (Boney M.) – The Subsonics
- "Brown Girl in the Ring" (Boney M.) – The Blade Squad, Asia Blue
- "Rasputin" (Boney M.) – The Subsonics
- "Girl I'm Gonna Miss You" (Milli Vanilli) – Rose, Sunny
- "I Can't Stand The Rain" (Eruption/Ann Peebles) – Pearl
- "Where Do You Go" (La Bouche/No Mercy) – Benny, The Blade Squad
- "Got a Man on My Mind" (Boney M.) – Ma Baker
- "Blame It on the Rain" (Milli Vanilli) – Rasputin, Janet, Ensemble
- "When I Die" (No Mercy) – Sunny, Rose
- "Calendar Song" (Boney M.) – Ezra, Alani, Janet & Ensemble
- "Let It All Be Music" (Boney M.) – Sunny, Rose, Shake, Asia, Pearl, Janet & Ensemble
- "Rivers of Babylon" (Boney M.) – Ensemble

=== Changes during production ===
- The carnival scene used to include more dialogue between the Subsonics, but was replaced with "The Calendar Song"
- For the first few weeks of the show, it was not Naz who gave evidence against Benny, but Asia.
- The parrot hanging above the audience used to be brought down during the finale, but now it is not.
- There used to be a big scene where the beatboxer from the subsonics suddenly started beatboxing on a bench and the other people from the subsonics started rapping but now they cut that out.

== Original London cast ==
In order of appearance:

- Grandma Ella – Hope Augustus
- Zadie – Alani Gibbon
- Young Sunny – Dion Laughton or Khai Shaw
- Janet – Darvina Plante
- Pearl – Melanie La Barrie
- Pastor Brown – Larrington Walker
- Sunny – Dwayne Wint
- Flow – Richard Francis (Lianhart)
- Shake – Harvey
- Isis – Helen Kurup
- G-Dog – Duane O'Garro
- Rasputin – Donovan F. Blackwood
- Benny – Davie Fairbanks
- Dex – Marc Small
- Naz – Ricky Norwood
- Marvin – Elliot Treend
- Hype – Page
- Ma Baker – Michelle Collins (until 6 January 2007)
- Asia Blue – Javine
- Sandra – Shelley Williams
- Rose – Camilla Beeput
- Johnny Cool – Emmanuel Sonubi
- Young Pearl – Shelley Williams
- Young Margaret – Maria Swainson
- Dancer 1 – Devina Eyesha

== Recording ==
The original London cast recording was released on 12 April 2007 on SonyBMG Records. It is currently only available to buy through Amazon Germany and Amazon UK. It was recorded in the studio during September 2006.
