= The Games (British TV series) =

British sports-reality television show

- Genre: Reality sports game show
- Presented by: Jamie Theakston (2003–2006); Holly Willoughby (2022); Freddie Flintoff (2022)
- Starring: Jayne Middlemiss (2003–2005); Kirsty Gallacher (2006); Alex Scott (2022); Yung Filly (2022)
- Voices of: David Goldstrom (2003–2006); Simon Brotherton (2022); Chris Kamara (2022)
- Theme music composer: Dobs Vye (2003–2006); A-Mnemonic (2022)
- Country of origin: United Kingdom
- Original language: English
- No. of series: 5

Production
- Running time: 60 minutes (inc. adverts)
- Production companies: Endemol UK Productions (2003–2005); Initial (2006, 2022)

Original release
- Network: Channel 4
- Release: 7 September 2003 – 25 March 2006
- Network: ITV
- Release: 9 May – 13 May 2022

The Games is a British reality sports game show that ran on Channel 4 for four series, in which 10 celebrities competed against each other, by doing Olympic-style events, such as weight lifting, gymnastics and diving. At the end of the series, the contestants with the most points from each round were awarded either a gold, silver or bronze medal.

The series was revived by ITV in May 2022, hosted by Holly Willoughby and Freddie Flintoff.

== History ==
The show was mainly filmed in Sheffield, at the Sheffield Arena, Don Valley Stadium and Ponds Forge. In later series, the English Institute of Sport, Sheffield, iceSheffield and in series 4 the National Watersports Centre in Nottingham were used for the first time. Most recently the show has been broadcast from the Crystal Palace National Sports Centre in south London.

=== Presenters ===
The Games was presented by Jamie Theakston for the entirety of its run, with track-side reports from Jayne Middlemiss in series 1–3 and Kirsty Gallacher in series 4. David Goldstrom was the commentator for the events.

For the 2022 revival series, it is presented by Holly Willoughby and Freddie Flintoff, with Simon Brotherton taking over as commentator with Chris Kamara by his side.

Person	Original				Revived
Person	Series				
Person	1	2	3	4	1
Presenters
Jamie Theakston	Main				
Holly Willoughby	—N/a				Main
Freddie Flintoff	—N/a				Main
Track–side reports
Jayne Middlemiss	Main				
Kirsty Gallacher	—N/a			Main	
Alex Scott	—N/a				Main
Commentators
David Goldstrom	Recurring				
Simon Brotherton	—N/a				Main
Chris Kamara	—N/a				Main

=== Companion shows ===
The Games also had an after-show called The Games: Live at Trackside, aired on Channel 4's sister channel E4. The first series was presented by Dougie Anderson, whilst the second was hosted by Gamezville presenters Darren Malcolm and Jamie Atiko. Justin Lee Collins and Caroline Flack took over as presenters for the third and fourth series. For the final series an extra one-hour show was added on E4 in the afternoon called The Games: Live at the Heats, and the evening after-show changed title to become The Games: Inside Track.

== Main series results ==
Series champions
Series		Female	Male
1	Winner	(gold) Azra Akın and Terri Dwyer	(gold) Harvey
1	Runner-up	(gold) Azra Akın and Terri Dwyer	(silver) James Hewitt
1	Third place	(bronze) Josie d'Arby	(bronze) Lee Latchford-Evans
2	Winner	(gold) Lady Isabella Hervey	(gold) Shane Lynch and Jarrod Batchelor
2	Runner-up	(silver) Katy Hill	(gold) Shane Lynch and Jarrod Batchelor
2	Third place	(bronze) Charlie Dimmock	(bronze) Romeo
3	Winner	(gold) Kirsty Gallacher	(gold) Philip Olivier
3	Runner-up	(silver) Tamara Czartoryska	(silver) Kevin Simm
3	Third place	(bronze) Lisa Maffia	(bronze) Chesney Hawkes
4	Winner	(gold) Javine Hylton	(gold) Jade Jones
4	Runner-up	(silver) Julia Goldsworthy	(silver) Marcel Somerville
4	Third place	(bronze) Michelle Gayle	(bronze) JK
5	Winner	(gold) Chelcee Grimes	(gold) Wes Nelson
5	Runner-up	(silver) Phoenix Gulzar-Brown	(silver) Ryan Thomas
5	Third place	(bronze) Rebecca Sarker	(bronze) Josh Herdman

=== Series 1 (2003) ===
The first series aired in 2003 and the celebrities that took part were:

Celebrity	Known for	Medal achieved
Azra Akın	Former Miss World	1st place, gold medalist(s)
Terri Dwyer	Hollyoaks actress	1st place, gold medalist(s)
MC Harvey	So Solid Crew rapper	1st place, gold medalist(s)
James Hewitt	Ex-lover of Diana, Princess of Wales	2nd place, silver medalist(s)
Josie d'Arby	Television presenter	3rd place, bronze medalist(s)
Lee Latchford-Evans	Steps singer	3rd place, bronze medalist(s)
Bobby Davro	Comedian	
Jean-Christophe Novelli	Chef	
Melanie C	Spice Girls singer	Withdrew
Gail Porter	Television presenter	Withdrew

Porter pulled out part-way through the run. A serious knee injury sustained in the judo competition against Akın also forced Chisholm to withdraw.

=== Series 2 (2004) ===
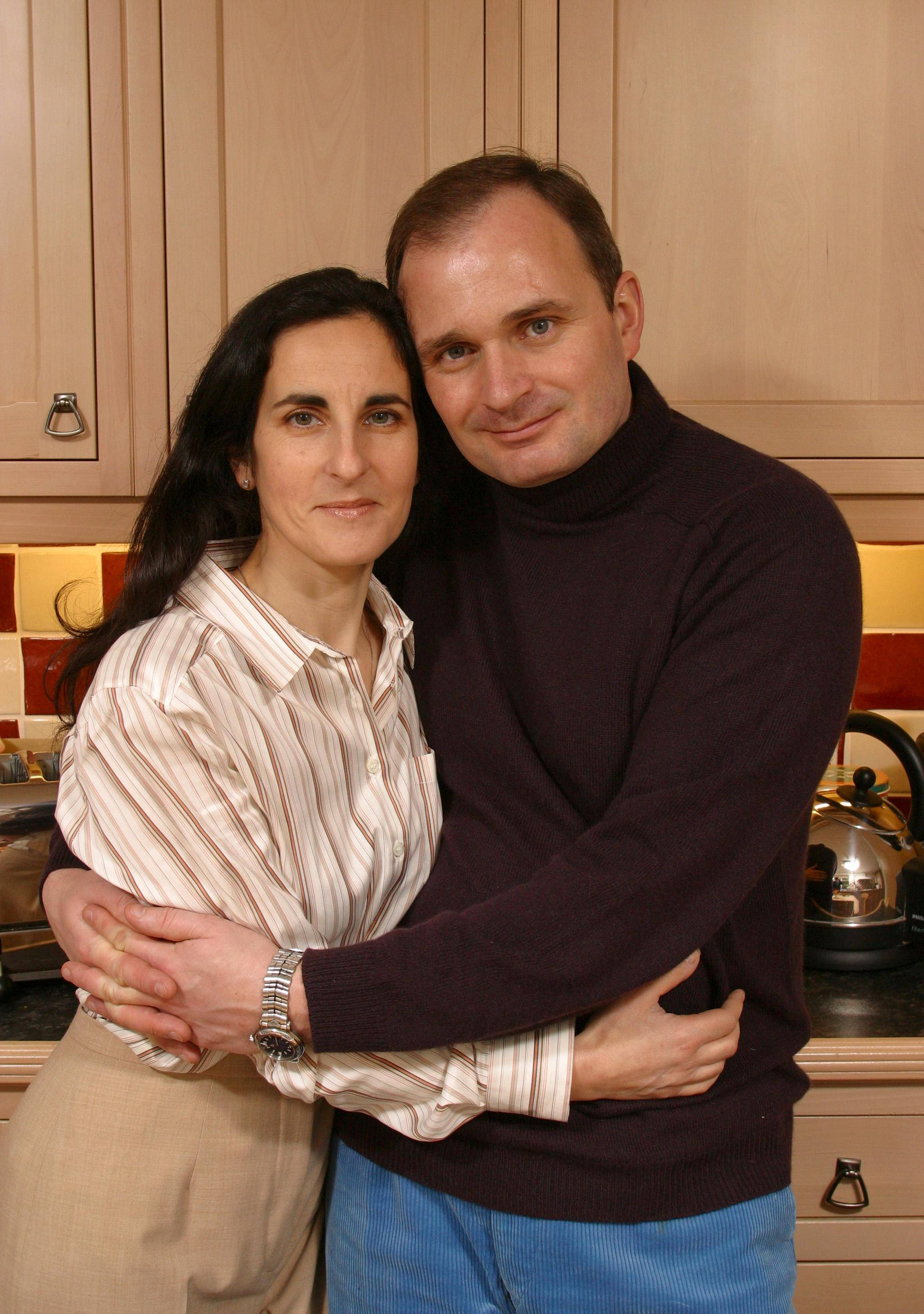
Charles Ingram competed in series two.

The second series aired in 2004 and the celebrities that took part were:

Celebrity	Known for	Medal achieved
Lady Isabella Hervey	Model & socialite	1st place, gold medalist(s)
Jarrod Bachelor	Former Mr Gay UK	1st place, gold medalist(s)
Shane Lynch	Boyzone singer	1st place, gold medalist(s)
Katy Hill	Television presenter	2nd place, silver medalist(s)
MC Romeo	So Solid Crew rapper	3rd place, bronze medalist(s)
Charlie Dimmock	Gardening expert & television presenter	3rd place, bronze medalist(s)
Charles Ingram	Who Wants to Be a Millionaire? cheat	
Linda Lusardi	Former model & actress	
Jodie Marsh	Model	
Pat Sharp	Television & radio presenter	

==== Champion of Champions 2004 ====
After the second series a special champion of champions edition took place, in which the top two male and female competitors from series one and two went head to head to compete for the title The Games Champion of Champions. The team from 2003 won. They comprised MC Harvey, James Hewitt, Terri Dwyer and Josie d'Arby (Azra Akın was unavailable to take part).

=== Series 3 (2005) ===
The third series commenced on 25 March 2005 and the celebrities that took part were:

Celebrity	Known for	Medal achieved
Kirsty Gallacher	Television presenter	1st place, gold medalist(s)
Philip Olivier	Actor	1st place, gold medalist(s)
Princess Tamara Czartoryski-Borbon	Model	2nd place, silver medalist(s)
Kevin Simm	Liberty X singer	2nd place, silver medalist(s)
Chesney Hawkes	Singer	3rd place, bronze medalist(s)
Lisa Maffia	So Solid Crew member & model	3rd place, bronze medalist(s)
Craig Charles	Red Dwarf actor & comedian	
Anna Walker	Television presenter	
Mel Giedroyc	Comedian	
Danny Foster	Former Hear'Say singer	
Jonathon Morris	Actor	Withdrew

Morris pulled out half-way through the run, and was replaced by Foster.

Injuries also forced Kevin Simm out of the sumo competition, and Craig Charles out of the speed skating and vaulting competitions.

==== Champion of Champions 2005 ====
After the third series, another special champion of champions edition took place in which the top two male and female competitors from Team 2003, Team 2004 and Team 2005 competed against each other in weightlifting, hammer throwing and finally the relay race. From Team 2003, James Hewitt, Harvey, Terri Dwyer and Josie D'Arby competed. From Team 2004, Romeo, Jarrod Batchelor, Katy Hill and Lady Isabella Hervey competed. From Team 2005, Kevin Simm, Philip Olivier, Lisa Maffia and Kirsty Gallacher, competed. Team 2005 narrowly beat the team from the first series overall.

=== Series 4 (2006) ===
The fourth series commenced on 17 March 2006, and was presented as usual by Jamie Theakston, and track-side coverage was taken over by Series Three contestant Kirsty Gallacher. There was a total of 18 different sporting events to test their skills and abilities. The men competed in water ski jump, weights, kendo, vault, diving, speed skating, cycling, javelin and 100m sprint. The women competed in whitewater kayak, hurdles, cycling, gym floor, swimming, curling, archery, hammer and 100m sprint.

Contestants that took part in the show were:

Celebrity	Known for	Medal achieved
Jade Jones	Damage singer	1st place, gold medalist(s)
Javine Hylton	Singer	1st place, gold medalist(s)
Julia Goldsworthy	Falmouth and Camborne MP	2nd place, silver medalist(s)
Marcel Somerville	Blazin' Squad rapper	2nd place, silver medalist(s)
Michelle Gayle	Singer & actress	3rd place, bronze medalist(s)
Jason King	Radio presenter	3rd place, bronze medalist(s)
Peter Duncan	Actor & television presenter	
Amanda Lamb	A Place in the Sun presenter	
Adam Rickitt	Former Coronation Street actor & singer	
Bernie Nolan	Former The Nolans singer	

Darren Day was among the original line-up, but after consistently failing to take part in training, he was replaced by eventual winner Jones. DJ Goldie was originally a competitor, but was forced to pull out due to an injury sustained in the training sessions for the water-ski event. He was replaced by Rickitt.

==== Scores ====
The Girls
Discipline	Amanda	Bernie	Javine	Julia	Michelle
Whitewater kayak	0	2	4	3	6
Hurdles	3	1	6	5	3
Cycling	4	2	4	6	0
Gym floor	0	3	6	5	2
Swimming	4	3	6	5	0
Curling	0	2	4	3	5
Archery	4	0	5	2	3
Hammer	2	3	5	4	2
100m sprint	2	0	5	3	4
Total	19	16	45	36	25

The Boys
Discipline	Peter	Adam	Jason	Jade	Marcel
Water ski jump	4	4	1	5	2
Weights	6	1	4	3	7
Kendo	3	0	4	5	3
Vault	0	3	4	5	6
Diving	6	1	4	5	3
Speed skating	5	1	2	6	3
Cycling	3	0	4	5	2
Javelin	0	2	5	6	3
100m sprint	2	0	4	4	5
Total	29	12	32	44	34

==== Champion of Champions 2006 ====
After the fourth series another special champion of champions edition took place in which the top two male and female competitors from series two, three and four competed against each other in a 50 m freestyle swim, diving and a 4 x 50 m freestyle relay at Ponds Forge in Sheffield.

Javine Hylton, Julia Goldsworthy MP, Jade Jones and MC Plat'num represented Team 2006, Kirsty Gallacher, Chesney Hawkes, Kevin Simm and HRH Princess Tamara represented Team 2005, and Lady Isabella Hervey, Linda Lusardi, Shane Lynch and Romeo represented Team 2004.

Team 2006 won the champion of champions 2006, scoring 29 points. The team of 2005 came second with 23. Finally team 2004 with 20. This Champion of Champions saw Shane Lynch achieve a dive which had never been performed on The Games before – a somersault. The trophy for the winners was presented to Team 2004, by the Lord Mayor of Sheffield, Councillor Roger Davison.

=== Series 5 (2022) ===
The series was originally commissioned for 2020 as The Real Games, and then for 2021, but both times were delayed due to COVID-19 restrictions and concerns. In October 2021, it was confirmed that the series would air in 2022.

==== Contestants ====
Celebrity	Known for	Medal achieved
Wes Nelson	Singer & television personality	1st place, gold medalist(s)
Chelcee Grimes	Singer, presenter & footballer	1st place, gold medalist(s)
Ryan Thomas	Former Coronation Street actor	2nd place, silver medalist(s)
Phoenix Gulzar-Brown	Model & Mel B's daughter	2nd place, silver medalist(s)
Josh Herdman	Harry Potter actor & mixed martial artist	3rd place, bronze medalist(s)
Rebecca Sarker	Emmerdale actress	3rd place, bronze medalist(s)
Lucrezia Millarini	ITV News newsreader	7th
Kevin Clifton	Former Strictly Come Dancing professional	8th
Christine McGuinness	Model & The Real Housewives of Cheshire star	9th
Max George	The Wanted singer	10th
Olivia Attwood	Television personality	11th
Colson Smith	Coronation Street actor	12th

==== Scores ====
Women
Discipline	Chelcee	Christine	Lucrezia	Olivia	Phoenix	Rebecca
100m hurdles	6	3	2	1	5	4
Synchronised diving	5	3	6	4	1	3
50m breast stroke	3	2	5	6	4	1
Javelin throw	2	5	3	1	6	4
400m race	6	1	4	2	3	5
Keirin	6	5	1	2	3	4
Speed climbing	5	3	4	1	6	2
Weightlifting	3	4	5	1	2	6
100m race	6	1	2	3	5	4
Total	42	27	32	21	35	33

Men
Discipline	Colson	Josh	Kevin	Max	Ryan	Wes
Hammer throw	3	2	5	2	6	4
400m race	3	5	4	1	2	6
50m freestyle	1	4	2	5	3	6
Synchronised diving	3	3	4	1	5	6
Canoe slalom	1	4	5	3	6	2
110m hurdles	1	5	2	4	3	6
Speed climbing	1	5	2	3	4	6
Elimination race	4	5	2	1	6	3
100m race	1	5	2	3	4	6
Total	18	38	28	23	39	45

==== Events ====
Women's 100m hurdles

Celebrity	Place	Points
Chelcee Grimes	1st	6
Phoenix Gulzar-Brown	2nd	5
Rebecca Sarker	3rd	4
Christine McGuinness	4th	3
Lucrezia Millarini	5th	2
Olivia Attwood	6th	1

Men's hammer throw

Celebrity	First throw	Second throw	Points
Ryan Thomas	27.00m	28.91m	6
Kevin Clifton	26.07m	No throw	5
Wes Nelson	No throw	25.57m	4
Colson Smith	20.04m	No throw	3
Josh Herdman	No throw	No throw	2
Max George	No throw	No throw	2

Mixed synchronised diving

Celebrity	First dive	Second dive	Total	Points
Lucrezia Millarini	52.50	49.50	102.00	6
Wes Nelson	52.50	49.50	102.00	6
Chelcee Grimes	39.00	52.00	91.00	5
Ryan Thomas	39.00	52.00	91.00	5
Olivia Attwood	33.00	39.00	72.00	4
Kevin Clifton	33.00	39.00	72.00	4
Christine McGuinness	36.00	33.00	69.00	3
Josh Herdman	36.00	33.00	69.00	3
Rebecca Sarker	33.00	36.00	69.00	3
Colson Smith	33.00	36.00	69.00	3
Phoenix Gulzar-Brown	27.75	40.50	68.25	1
Max George	27.75	40.50	68.25	1

Men's 400m race

Celebrity	Time	Place	Points
Wes Nelson	57.58	1st	6
Josh Herdman	58.35	2nd	5
Kevin Clifton	1:02.04	3rd	4
Colson Smith	1:05.18	4th	3
Ryan Thomas	1:07.86	5th	2
Max George	1:16.55	6th	1

Men's 50m freestyle

Celebrity	Time	Place	Points
Wes Nelson	32.92	1st	6
Max George	34.04	2nd	5
Josh Herdman	35.15	3rd	4
Ryan Thomas	35.52	4th	3
Kevin Clifton	42.00	5th	2
Colson Smith	47.71	6th	1

Men's canoe slalom

Celebrity	Time	Place	Points
Ryan Thomas	79.87	1st	6
Kevin Clifton	109.90	2nd	5
Josh Herdman	115.14	3rd	4
Max George	119.90	4th	3
Wes Nelson	142.04	5th	2
Colson Smith	191.85	6th	1

Women's 50m breast stroke

Celebrity	Time	Place	Points
Olivia Attwood	51.67	1st	6
Lucrezia Millarini	52.57	2nd	5
Phoenix Gulzar-Brown	57.48	3rd	4
Chelcee Grimes	57.73	4th	3
Christine McGuinness	1:16.63	5th	2
Rebecca Sarker	1:24.71	6th	1

Men's 100m hurdles

Celebrity	Place	Points
Wes Nelson	1st	6
Josh Herdman	2nd	5
Max George	3rd	4
Ryan Thomas	4th	3
Kevin Clifton	5th	2
Colson Smith	6th	1

Women's javelin

Celebrity	First throw	Second throw	Points
Phoenix Gulzar-Brown	No throw	22.46m	6
Christine McGuinness	No throw	20.05m	5
Rebecca Sarker	13.41m	16.71m	4
Lucrezia Millarini	14.68m	No throw	3
Chelcee Grimes	No throw	13.87m	2
Olivia Attwood	10.79m	11.38m	1

Women's 400m race

Celebrity	Time	Place	Points
Chelcee Grimes	1:06.76	1st	6
Rebecca Sarker	1:12.97	2nd	5
Lucrezia Millarini	1:13.43	3rd	4
Phoenix Gulzar-Brown	1:15.90	4th	3
Olivia Attwood	1:16.37	5th	2
Christine McGuinness	1:33.02	6th	1

Women's keirin

Celebrity	Place	Points
Chelcee Grimes	1st	6
Christine McGuinness	2nd	5
Rebecca Sarker	3rd	4
Phoenix Gulzar-Brown	4th	3
Olivia Attwood	5th	2
Lucrezia Millarini	6th	1

Men's speed climbing
Heats

Battle	Celebrity	Time	Result	Points
1	Wes Nelson	15.70	Winner	—N/a
1	Kevin Clifton	37.06	Loser	2
2	Josh Herdman	24.90	Winner	—N/a
2	Colson Smith	46.62	Loser	1
3	Max George	22.99	Winner	—N/a
3	Ryan Thomas	23.79	Loser	—N/a

Semi-final

Battle	Celebrity	Time	Result	Points
1	Wes Nelson	16.08	Winner	—N/a
1	Ryan Thomas	17.96	Loser	4
2	Josh Herdman	21.36	Winner	—N/a
2	Max George	Timeout	Loser	3

Final

Order	Celebrity	Time	Result	Points
1	Wes Nelson	14.27	Winner	6
1	Josh Herdman	14.90	Loser	5

Men's elimination race

Celebrity	Place	Points
Ryan Thomas	1st	6
Josh Herdman	2nd	5
Colson Smith	3rd	4
Wes Nelson	4th	3
Kevin Clifton	5th	2
Max George	6th	1

Women's speed climbing

- Olivia Attwood did not compete in this event and automatically received 1 point.

Heats

Battle	Celebrity	Time	Result	Points
1	Phoenix-Gulzar Brown	26.74	Winner	—N/a
1	Lucrezia Millarini	—N/a	Loser	—N/a
2	Chelcee Grimes	37.10	Winner	—N/a
2	Christine McGuinness	—N/a	Loser	—N/a
3	Rebecca Sarker	Timeout	Loser	2
3	Lucrezia Millarini	Timeout	Loser	—N/a

Semi-final

Battle	Celebrity	Time	Result	Points
1	Phoenix Gulzar-Brown	25.75	Winner	—N/a
1	Lucrezia Millarini	35.18	Loser	4
2	Chelcee Grimes	29.01	Winner	—N/a
2	Christine McGuinness	46.44	Loser	3

Final

Order	Celebrity	Time	Result	Points
1	Phoenix Gulzar-Brown	23.84	Winner	6
1	Chelcee Grimes	25.09	Loser	5

Women's weightlifting

Celebrity	Best lift	Points
Rebecca Sarker	58.80	6
Lucrezia Millarini	55.81	5
Christine McGuinness	55.08	4
Chelcee Grimes	54.33	3
Phoenix Gulzar-Brown	46.94	2
Olivia Attwood	41.97	1

Women's 100m race

Celebrity	Time	Place	Points
Chelcee Grimes	13.94	1st	6
Phoenix Gulzar-Brown	14.90	2nd	5
Rebecca Sarker	15.30	3rd	4
Olivia Attwood	15.43	4th	3
Lucrezia Millarini	15.58	5th	2
Christine McGuinness	15.67	6th	1

Men's 100m race

Celebrity	Time	Place	Points
Wes Nelson	12.08	1st	6
Josh Herdman	12.67	2nd	5
Ryan Thomas	13.21	3rd	4
Max George	13.41	4th	3
Kevin Clifton	13.57	5th	2
Colson Smith	14.85	6th	1
