= The Big I Am =

- Directed by: Nic Auerbach
- Written by: Tim Cunningham
- Produced by: Robert Fucilla
- Starring: Leo Gregory; Michael Madsen; Vincent Regan; Steven Berkoff; Beatrice Rosen; Robert Fucilla
- Cinematography: Shane Daly
- Edited by: Jeremy Nicholls
- Music by: James Radford
- Distributed by: E1 Entertainment/ Cinematic Productions
- Release date: 12 April 2010
- Country: United Kingdom
- Language: English

The Big I Am is a 2010 British gangster film starring Michael Madsen and Leo Gregory. It was released straight to DVD on 12 April 2010.

== Plot ==
"A cruel twist of fate catapults small time crook Mickey Skinner into the big league, as head of a brutal London gang, poised on the brink of a lucrative deal."

== Cast ==
- Leo Gregory as Skinner
- Michael Madsen as Martell
- Vincent Regan as Barber
- Robert Fucilla as Floyd
- Steven Berkoff as The MC
- Beatrice Rosen as Liza
- Paul Kaye as Keys
- Phil Davis as Stubbs
- MC Harvey as Robbo
- Joel Beckett as Johnny

== Production ==
The film was shot in areas of South Wales, including Cardiff and Caldicot, Monmouthshire.
