= Mike Phillips (writer) =

Guyanese-British author (born 1941)

Mike Phillips OBE FRSL
- Born: Michael Angus Phillips; 8 August 1941 (age 85); Georgetown, Guyana, British Guyana
- Education: University of London; University of Essex; Goldsmiths College
- Occupations: Writer and broadcast journalist
- Relatives: Trevor Phillips (brother)

Michael Angus Phillips OBE FRSL (born 8 August 1941), is a British writer and broadcast journalist of Guyanese descent. He is best known for his crime fiction, including four novels featuring black journalist Sam Dean.

== Early years ==
Mike Phillips was born in Georgetown, a port city in the equatorial colony British Guiana (now Guyana). In 1956, with his family he migrated to Islington in London, England, when he was aged about 14. He was educated at the University of London (English), the University of Essex (Politics), and received a Postgraduate Certificate in Education from Goldsmiths College, London. His brother is the former politician and writer Trevor Phillips with whom he has collaborated on writing about the Windrush generation.

== Career ==
Phillips worked as a teacher in the early 1970s, before being invited to present an April 1973 episode of the BBC Television programme Open Door about the experiences of black teachers in the English education system. He subsequently worked for the BBC as a journalist and broadcaster until 1983, then became a lecturer in media studies at the University of Westminster. In 1992 he became a full-time writer. He has said, "One of the experiences that made me a writer was the realisation that I was written out of a small piece of literary history in the film Prick Up Your Ears, the biography of controversial playwright Joe Orton, author of Entertaining Mr Sloane. Orton and his friend Kenneth Halliwell were frequent visitors to Essex Road Library where I worked as a library assistant. I regularly spoke to them and didn't know that they were defacing the books, an act that eventually put them in jail. When the scene was depicted on film I felt I should have been included, and realised that you can't rely on others to write your story, sometimes you have to do it yourself."

Phillips is best known for his crime fiction, including four novels featuring black journalist Sam Dean: Blood Rights (1989; serialised on BBC TV starring Brian Bovell), The Late Candidate (1990), Point of Darkness (1994), An Image to Die For (1995). He is also the author of London Crossings: A Biography of Black Britain (2001), a series of interlinked autobiographical essays and stories. He has said that he thinks of himself as both an English writer and a black British writer. With his brother, the political journalist Trevor Phillips, he wrote Windrush: The Irresistible Rise of Multi-Racial Britain (1998) to accompany a BBC television series marking the 50th anniversary of the arrival in Britain of the HMT Empire Windrush, the ship that brought the first significant wave of post-war migrants from the Caribbean.

He writes for The Guardian newspaper, and was formerly cross-cultural curator at the Tate and a trustee of the National Heritage Memorial Fund and the Heritage Lottery Fund.

Phillips was a member of the independent advisory group that delivered the Windrush Lessons Learned Review, a report published in March 2020 based on an enquiry into the government's handling of the "Windrush scandal".

In 2021, his novel The Dancing Face, originally published in 1997, was reissued by Penguin Books in the "Black Britain: Writing Back" series curated by Bernardine Evaristo.

== Awards and honours ==
- 1991 – Silver Dagger award by the Crime Writers' Association for The Late Candidate
- 1996 – Arts Foundation Award for Thriller Writing
- 2000 – elected a Fellow of the Royal Society of Literature
- 2007 – OBE (Officer of the Most Excellent Order of the British Empire) in the New Year's Honours List for services to Broadcasting
- 2007 – Fellow of Goldsmiths' College

== Books ==
=== Fiction ===
- Smell of the Coast and Other Stories (1987). London: Akira Press.
- Boyz 'n the Hood (1991). London: Pan.
- The Dancing Face (1997). London and New York: HarperCollins. Reissued 2021, Penguin Books.
- A Shadow of Myself (2000). New York: HarperCollins.
- Kind of Union (2005). London: Continuum.
- (With Stejarel Olaru) Rîmaru: Butcher of Bucharest (2012). Profusion Publishers.

==== Sam Dean series ====
- Blood Rights (1989). London: Michael Joseph; New York: St. Martin's Press. (Adapted for BBC TV in 1989; starring Brian Bovell)
- The Late Candidate (1990). London: Michael Joseph; New York: St. Martin's Press.
- Point of Darkness: A Sam Dean Mystery (1994). London: Michael Joseph, 1994; New York: St. Martin's Press.
- An Image to Die For (1997). New York: St. Martin's Press.

=== Non-fiction ===
- Community Work and Racism (1982). London: Routledge.
- Notting Hill in the Sixties (1991); text, with photography by Charlie Phillips. London: Lawrence & Wishart.
- Windrush: The Irresistible Rise of Multi-Racial Britain (with Trevor Phillips). London: HarperCollins, 1998. ISBN 0-00-255909-9.
- London Crossings: A Biography of Black Britain. London: Continuum, 2001.
