= Haters (So Solid Crew song) =

Single by So Solid Crew

from the album They Don't Know
- Released: 7 January 2002
- Genre: Grime; garage
- Length: 4.17
- Label: Relentless
- Songwriter(s): Darren Leslie James Weir, Shabi Naqui, Jermaine Williams, Jason Marlon Moore, Safi Naqui
- Producer(s): Mr. Shabz

So Solid Crew singles chronology
"They Don't Know" (2001)	"Haters" (2002)	"Ride wid Us" (2002)

"Haters" is a song by UK garage/hip hop group So Solid Crew which was released as a single on 7 January 2002. It reached number 8 on the UK Singles Chart. It was the third of five consecutive top 20 hit singles for the group. The music video was directed by Andy Hylton.

The song was mentioned in the 2011 film Anuvahood.
