= Sean Bean =

British actor (born 1959)

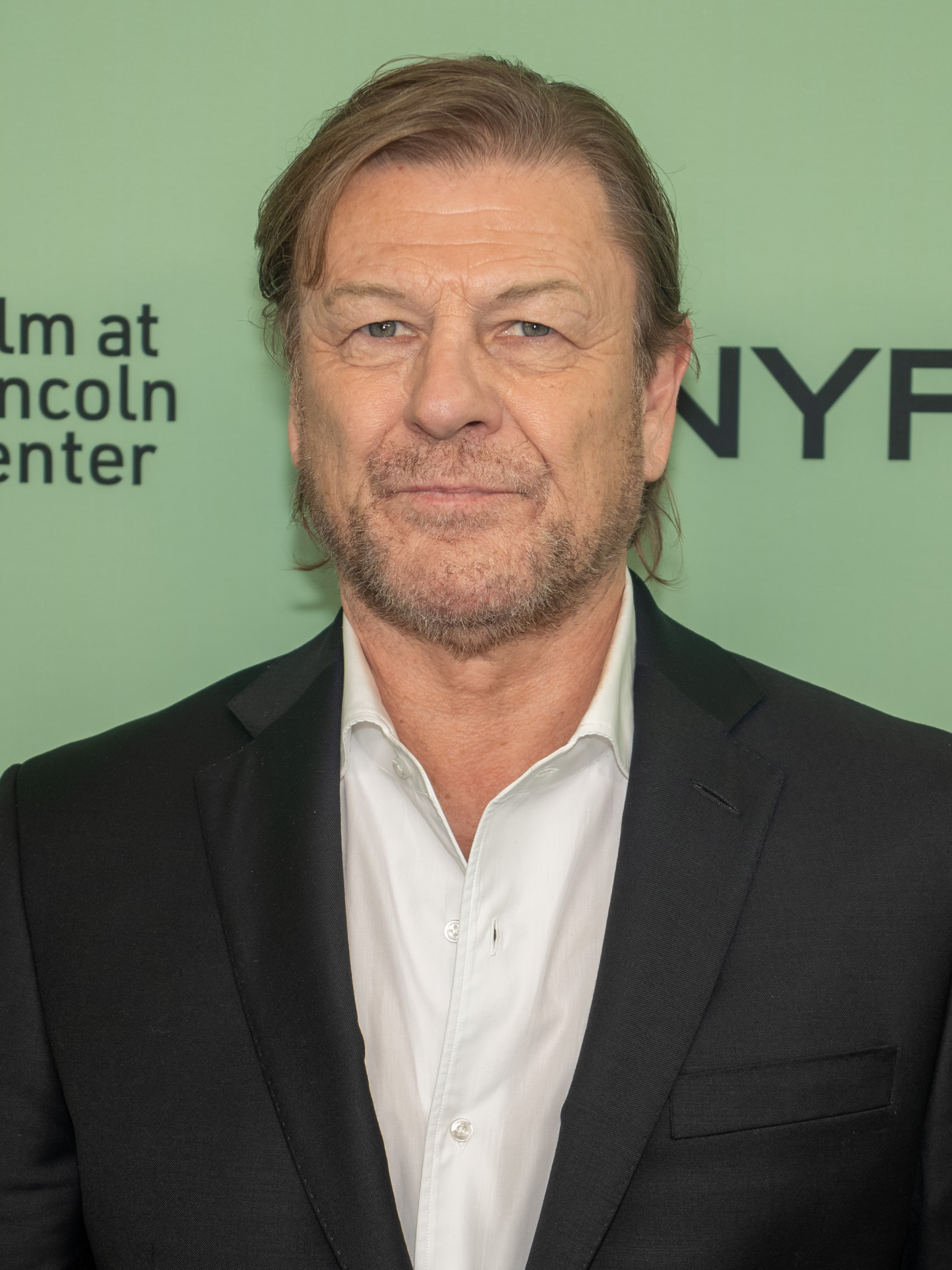
- Bean at the 2025 New York Film Festival
- Born: Shaun Mark Bean; 17 April 1959 (age 67); Sheffield, South Yorkshire, England
- Education: Royal Academy of Dramatic Art (RADA)
- Occupation: Actor
- Years active: 1983–present
- Spouses: Debra James (m. 1981; div. 1988); Melanie Hill (m. 1990; div. 1997); Abigail Cruttenden (m. 1997; div. 2000); Georgina Sutcliffe (m. 2008; div. 2011); Ashley Moore (m. 2017)
- Children: 3

Sean Bean (born Shaun Mark Bean, 17 April 1959) is an English actor. Recognised for his work in both film and television, he has received various accolades including three BAFTA TV Awards, a Critics' Choice Award, an Actor Award and an International Emmy Award.

After graduating from the Royal Academy of Dramatic Art, he made his professional debut in a production of Romeo and Juliet in 1983 at The Watermill Theatre. Retaining his Yorkshire accent, he first found mainstream success for his portrayal of Richard Sharpe in the ITV television drama series Sharpe, which originally ran from 1993 to 1997.

Bean made his film debut in the historical drama Caravaggio (1986) and received further attention for his roles in Stormy Monday (1988) and Patriot Games (1992). He played the main antagonist Alec Trevelyan in the James Bond film GoldenEye (1995) and had a supporting role in the neo-noir action thriller Ronin (1998). Bean achieved international recognition for portraying Boromir in the fantasy trilogy The Lord of the Rings (2001–2003). Following the success of Lord of the Rings, Bean appeared in a variety of films, including in the science fiction Equilibrium (2002), the action-adventure heist National Treasure (2004), Greek King Odysseus in the epic historical action Troy (2004), the mystery psychological thriller Flightplan (2005), Harry Mason in the supernatural horror films Silent Hill (2006) and Silent Hill: Revelation (2012), the action horror Black Death (2010), and the epic science fiction survival film The Martian (2015).

Bean's television roles include the BBC anthology series Accused and the six-part drama Broken, Ned Stark in the HBO fantasy drama Game of Thrones, and the ITV historical drama series Henry VIII and Legends. As a voice actor, he has been featured in the video games The Elder Scrolls IV: Oblivion (2006), Sid Meier's Civilization VI (2016), and the feature films Wolfwalkers (2020) and Mummies (2023) among others. Since 2002, Bean has been the main voiceover on adverts for O2, a telecommunications services provider. In 2022, he won the British Academy Television Award for Best Actor for Time, a BBC One drama.

== Early life ==
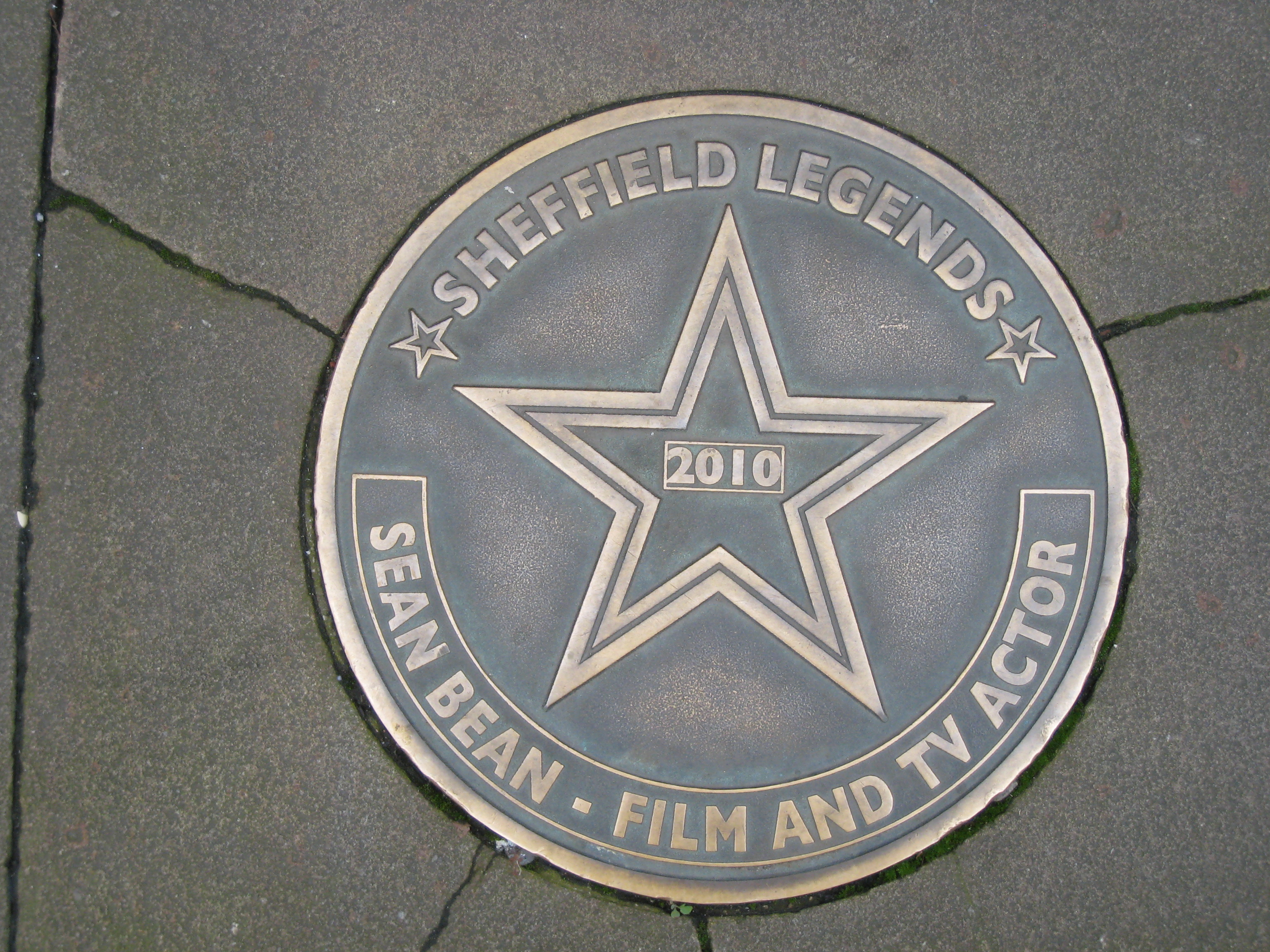
Sheffield Legends plaque in Bean's home city of Sheffield

Shaun Mark Bean was born in the Handsworth suburb of Sheffield on 17 April 1959, the son of Rita (née Tuckwood) and Brian Kenneth Bean (born 1935). He has a younger sister, Lorraine. His paternal grandfather, Harold Bean Jr. (1914–2001), served in the Royal Navy in the Second World War and was a stud mill labourer who later became a pacifist. His father owned a fabrication company that employed 50 people, including Bean's mother, who worked as a secretary. Despite becoming relatively wealthy, the family never moved away from the council estate as they preferred to remain close to friends and family. As a child, Bean smashed a glass door during an argument, which left a piece of glass embedded in his leg that briefly impeded his walking, and left a large scar. This prevented him from pursuing his ambition of playing football professionally.

Bean first attended a local school, Handsworth Junior School, before going to Athelstan School until he was 12, when he went to study at Brook School. In 1975, Bean left Brook Comprehensive School with O levels in Art and English. After a job at a supermarket and another for the local council, he started work at his father's firm. Once a week, he attended Rotherham College of Arts and Technology to study welding. While at college, he came upon an art class, and decided to pursue his interest in art. After attending courses at two other colleges, one for half a day and the other for less than a week, he returned to Rotherham College, where he enrolled in a drama course. After some college plays and one at Rotherham Civic Theatre, he won a scholarship to the Royal Academy of Dramatic Art (RADA), starting a seven-term course in January 1981.

== Career ==
=== 1983–1994: Early work, Sharpe ===
Bean graduated from RADA in 1983, making his professional acting debut later that year as Tybalt in Romeo and Juliet at the Watermill Theatre in Newbury. His early career involved a mixture of stage and screen work. As an actor, he adopted the Irish spelling of his first name. His first national exposure came in an advert for Barbican non-alcoholic lager. In 1984, he starred in David and Jonathan by William Douglas-Home at the Redgrave Theatre in Farnham. Between 1986 and 1988, he was a member of the Royal Shakespeare Company, appearing in productions of Romeo and Juliet, The Fair Maid of the West, and A Midsummer Night's Dream. He appeared in his first film, Derek Jarman's Caravaggio (1986), opposite Tilda Swinton, playing Ranuccio Tomassoni, followed by the same director's War Requiem (1988). He had the protagonist role in Stormy Monday (1988), directed by Mike Figgis. In 1989, he starred as the evil Dominic O'Brien in The Fifteen Streets, where he gained a dedicated following.

During the late 1980s and early 1990s, Bean became an established actor on British television. In 1990, Bean starred in Jim Sheridan's adaptation of the John B. Keane play The Field. Also in 1990, his role as the journalist Anton in Windprints examined the difficult problems of apartheid in South Africa. He appeared in the BBC productions Clarissa (1991) (with Saskia Wickham and Lynsey Baxter) and Lady Chatterley (1993) (with Joely Richardson). In 1996, he combined his love of football with his career to finally achieve his childhood dream of playing for Sheffield United, starring as Jimmy Muir in the film When Saturday Comes. Although the film was not critically acclaimed, Bean received credit for a good performance. In August 1997, Bean appeared in what became a famous Sky Sports commercial for the upcoming 1997–98 Premier League season. His football-related work continued in 1998 when he narrated La Coupe de la Gloire, the official film of the 1998 FIFA World Cup held in France.

Bean's critical successes in Caravaggio and Lady Chatterley contributed to his emerging image as a sex symbol, but he became most closely associated with the character of Richard Sharpe, the maverick Napoleonic Wars rifleman in the ITV television series Sharpe. The series was based on Bernard Cornwell's novels about the Peninsular War, and the fictional experiences of a band of soldiers in the famed 95th Rifles. Starting with Sharpe's Rifles, the series followed the fortunes and misfortunes of Richard Sharpe as he rose from the ranks as a Sergeant, promoted to Lieutenant in Portugal, to Lieutenant Colonel by the time of the Battle of Waterloo.

Bean was not the first actor to be chosen to play Sharpe. As Paul McGann was injured while playing football two days into filming, the producers initially tried to work around his injury, but it proved impossible and Bean replaced him. The series ran continuously from 1993 to 1997, with three episodes produced each year. It was filmed under challenging conditions, first in Ukraine and later in Portugal. After several years of rumours, more episodes were produced: Sharpe's Challenge (2006) and Sharpe's Peril (2008). Both of these were released as two cinema-length 90-minute episodes per series. With a role as enigmatic Lord Richard Fenton in the TV miniseries Scarlett, Bean made the transition to Hollywood feature films. His first notable Hollywood appearance was that of an Irish republican terrorist in the 1992 film adaptation of Patriot Games. While filming his death scene, Harrison Ford hit him with a boat hook, giving him a permanent scar. Bean's rough-cut looks made him a patent choice for a villain, and his role in Patriot Games was the first of several villains that he would portray, all of whom die in gruesome ways.

=== 1995–2011: The Lord of the Rings and Game of Thrones ===
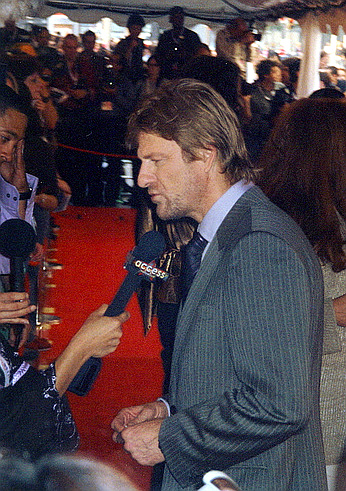
Bean at the premiere of North Country at the 2005 Toronto International Film Festival

In the 1995 film GoldenEye, Bean portrayed James Bond's nemesis Alec Trevelyan (MI6's 006). He played the weak-stomached Spence in Ronin (1998), a wife-beating ex-con in Essex Boys (2000), and a malevolent kidnapper/jewel thief in Don't Say a Word (2001). He was also widely recognised as villainous treasure hunter Ian Howe in National Treasure, and played a villainous scientist in The Island (2005). In the independent film Far North, he plays a Russian mercenary who gets lost in the tundra and is rescued by an Inuit woman and her daughter, whom he later pits against one another.

Bean's most prominent role was as Boromir in Peter Jackson's The Lord of the Rings trilogy. His major screen time occurs in the first instalment, The Lord of the Rings: The Fellowship of the Ring. He appears briefly in flashbacks in The Lord of the Rings: The Two Towers and The Lord of the Rings: The Return of the King, as well as in a scene from the extended edition of The Two Towers. Before casting finished, rumours circulated that Jackson had considered Bean for the role of Aragorn, but neither Bean nor Jackson confirmed this in subsequent interviews. Bean's fear of flying in helicopters caused him difficulties in mountainous New Zealand, where the trilogy was filmed. After a particularly rough ride, he vowed not to fly to a location again; in one instance, he chose to take a ski lift into the mountains while wearing his full costume (complete with shield, armour, and sword) and then hike the final few miles.

Other roles gave more scope for his acting abilities. In 1999's Extremely Dangerous, his character walked a fine line between villain and hero. He became a repentant, poetry-reading Grammaton cleric who succumbs to his emotions in 2002's Equilibrium, a quirky alien cowboy in 2003's The Big Empty, and a sympathetic and cunning Odysseus in the 2004 film Troy. He appeared with other Hollywood stars in Moby's music video "We Are All Made of Stars" in February 2002. In the same year, he returned to the stage in London performing in Macbeth. Due to popular demand, the production ran until March 2003. In 2005, Bean had sizeable roles in the films Flightplan and North Country.

Bean has done voice-over work, mostly in the British advertising industry. He has featured in television adverts for O2, Morrisons and Barnardos as well as for Acuvue and the Sci-Fi Channel in the United States. He also does the voice-over for the National Blood Service's television and radio campaign. Bean has also filmed a TV ad for Yorkshire Tea, a United Kingdom brand of tea. For the role playing video game, The Elder Scrolls IV: Oblivion, he voiced Martin Septim. Bean's distinctive voice has also been used in the intro and outro segments of the BBC Formula 1 racing coverage for the 2011 and 2012 seasons.

Bean completed a one-hour pilot, Faceless, for American television. He has also appeared in Outlaw (2007), an independent British remake of the 1986 horror film The Hitcher; here he used an American accent again. In 2009, he appeared in the Red Riding trilogy as the malevolent John Dawson. He also appeared in Percy Jackson & the Olympians: The Lightning Thief (2010), playing the role of Zeus, the king of Mount Olympus and God of the sky, thunder, and lightning. Also, that year, Bean starred in Cash, playing the lead role of Pyke Kubic, a dangerous man determined to recover his wealth in a bad economy. Cash explored the role money plays in today's hard economic times. Bean also played the villain's twin brother, Reese. Bean starred in the first season of Game of Thrones, HBO's adaptation of the A Song of Ice and Fire novels by George R. R. Martin, playing the part of Lord Eddard "Ned" Stark. Bean and Peter Dinklage were the two actors whose inclusion show runners David Benioff and D. B. Weiss considered necessary for the show to become a success, and for whose roles no other actors were considered. His portrayal won him critical praise; as The A.V. Club's reviewer put it, he "portrayed Ned as a man who knew he lived in the muck but hoped for better and assumed everyone else would come along for the ride." HBO's promotional efforts focused on Bean as the show's leading man and best-known actor.

=== 2012–present: Further film and television roles ===
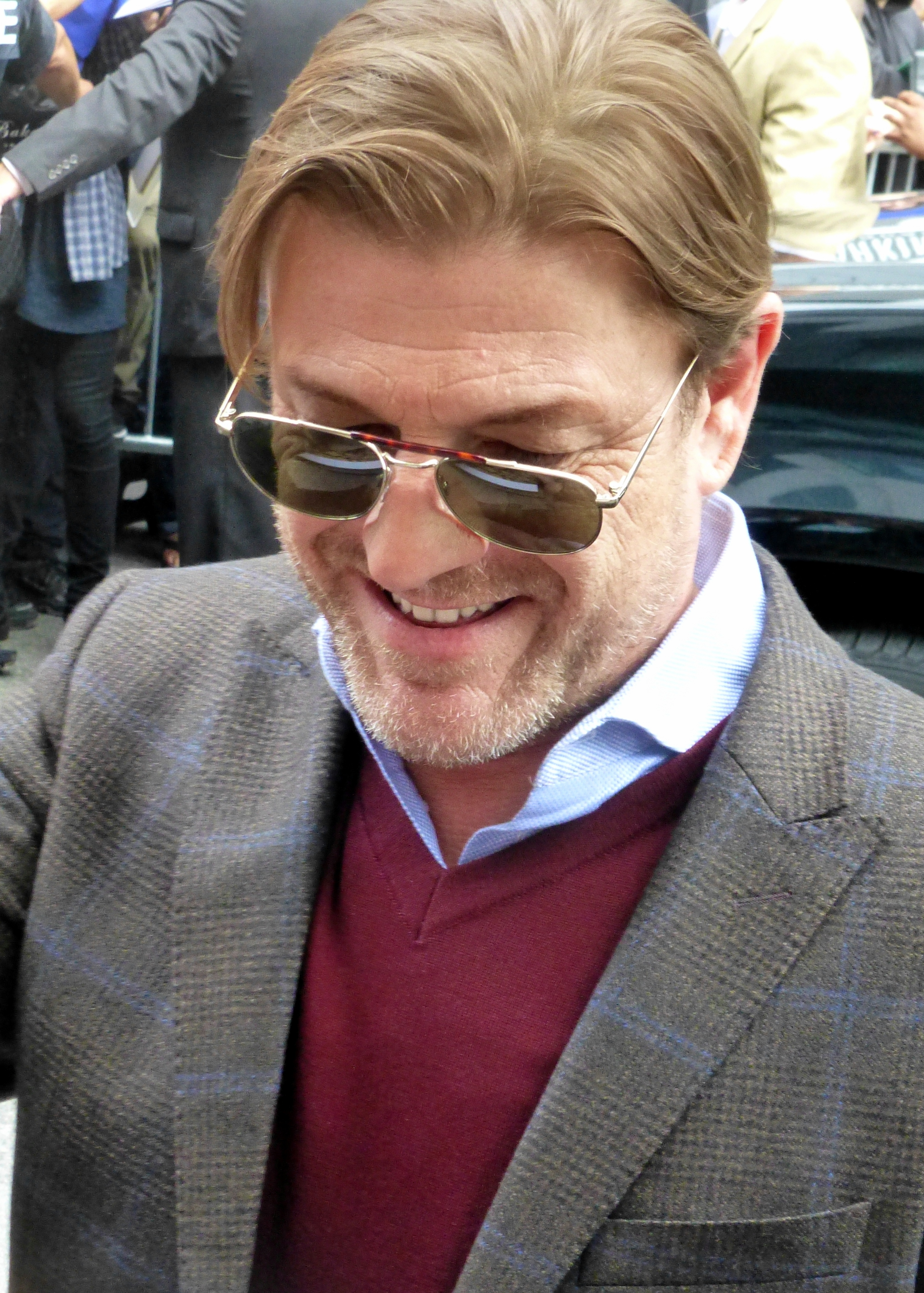
Bean at a press conference for Ridley Scott's The Martian, 2015 Toronto Film Festival

In 2012, Bean appeared in four films: Soldiers of Fortune; Cleanskin, in which he plays a secret service agent faced with the task of pursuing and eliminating a suicide bomber and his terrorist cell; Tarsem Singh's Snow White adaptation, Mirror Mirror; and the sequel Silent Hill: Revelation, in which he reprised his role as Christopher Da Silva. Also that year, Bean co-starred in the ABC drama series Missing, and appeared as cross-dressing teacher Simon in the opening episode of the second season of UK television series Accused, a role which would earn him a Royal Television Society best actor award.

Bean starred in the espionage television series Legends as Martin Odum, an FBI agent who takes on various fabricated identities to go undercover. The show was canceled after its second season. An intensive viral marketing campaign was centred on the hashtag #DontKillSeanBean, focusing on the various deaths of his past characters and promising his character in Legends would not suffer the same fate. The campaign culminated with a Funny or Die exclusive video featuring Bean filming a scene for the show where he's become so accustomed to dying on screen that he expects his character to die a bizarrely gruesome death despite the simplicity of the scene.

From 2015 to 2017, Bean starred in the ITV Encore drama series The Frankenstein Chronicles. In that time, he also starred in multiple notable films including Jupiter Ascending, Pixels, and The Martian. In 2017, Bean starred in the BBC series Broken as the troubled priest Father Michael Kerrigan, which earned him a BAFTA award for Best Actor. In 2019, Bean played a damaged veteran in the TV drama World on Fire, basing his interpretation on his late paternal grandfather.

On 31 May 2020, Bean appeared on Josh Gad's YouTube series Reunited Apart which reunites the cast of popular movies through video-conferencing, and promotes donations to non-profit charities. The episode saw Bean reunited with fellow Lord of the Rings castmates Sean Astin, Orlando Bloom, Billy Boyd, Ian McKellen, Dominic Monaghan, Viggo Mortensen, Miranda Otto, John Rhys-Davies, Andy Serkis, Liv Tyler, Karl Urban, and Elijah Wood, plus composer Howard Shore, writer Philippa Boyens and director Peter Jackson.

In 2021, the actor was reunited with Jimmy McGovern (author of Broken and Accused) and Stephen Graham (his co-star in Tracie's Story) for the 3-part BBC prison drama Time.

Bean starred alongside Nicola Walker in Stefan Golaszewski's drama series Marriage (2022), which opened to mixed reviews from both critics and viewers.

In 2025, he played the main role of Ronnie Phelan, head of a drug dealer family, alongside Julie Graham, and Jack McMullen, playing his wife and son, and James Nelson-Joyce, his number two, in the BBC Liverpool based gangster television series This City Is Ours (2025).

== Public image ==
=== Personality ===
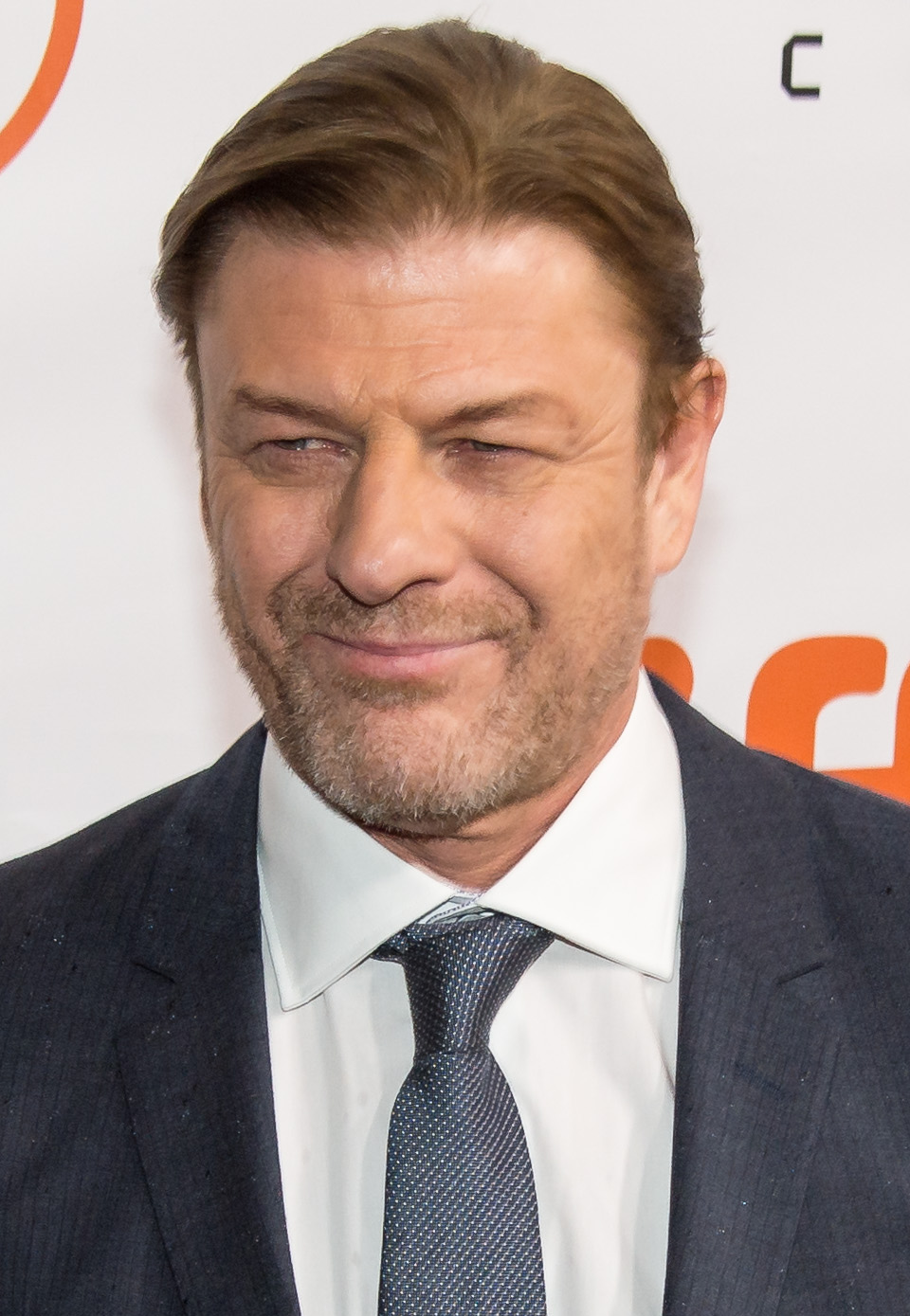
Bean at the 2015 Toronto International Film Festival

Bean is often described as "down to earth" and has retained his Yorkshire accent. He says that he does not mind being considered as a "bit of rough" by women. He has developed a reputation as a loner, a label that he considers unfair. He has described himself instead as quiet, and interviewers confirm that he is a "man of few words", with one interviewer calling him "surprisingly shy". He admits that he can be a workaholic; he reads books or listens to music in his spare time, and is a skilled pianist. He is also a keen gardener, welder, and sketcher. Popular in his home county, a 2018 poll for Yorkshire Day saw Bean ranked the second greatest Yorkshireman ever behind Monty Python comedian, and fellow Sheffielder, Michael Palin.

=== Acting style ===
Despite being professionally trained, Bean adopted an instinctive style of acting that some say makes him especially well-suited to portraying his characters' depths. He has said that the most difficult part is at the start of filming when trying to understand the character. After achieving this, he can snap in and out of character instantly. This ability to go from the quiet man on set to the warrior Boromir "amazed" Sean Astin during filming of The Fellowship of the Ring (2001). Other fans include directors Mike Figgis and Wolfgang Petersen, who described working with Bean as a "beautiful thing".

=== Deaths of characters ===
For many years, Bean's characters died on screen, a phenomenon that gained notoriety on the internet and in The Lord of The Rings, Game of Thrones and James Bond fandoms, becoming an Internet meme. Bean's favourite on-screen death is Boromir in The Fellowship of the Ring: "I thought his death was very heroic and triumphant and poignant. It had pathos." As an homage to this meme, Bean appears in 2018 Hitman 2 video game as an elusive target named Mark Faba, a.k.a. "The Undying" for his seeming inability to die.

In September 2019, Bean revealed that he had begun turning down roles in which his character is killed because the pattern had become predictable.

== Personal life ==
Bean has been married five times and divorced four times. He married his secondary school sweetheart Debra James on 11 April 1981, and they were divorced in 1988. He met actress Melanie Hill at the Royal Academy of Dramatic Art, and they were married on 27 February 1990. Their first daughter was born in October 1987, and their second was born in September 1991. Their marriage ended in divorce in August 1997. During the filming of Sharpe, Bean met actress Abigail Cruttenden, and they were married on 22 November 1997. Their daughter was born in November 1998. They were divorced in July 2000. In addition to his three children, Bean has four grandchildren.

Bean began dating actress Georgina Sutcliffe in 2006. After cancelling their planned January 2008 wedding on the eve of the ceremony for "personal reasons", he married Sutcliffe at the Marylebone Town Hall in London on 19 February 2008. During allegations that Bean physically abused Sutcliffe in 2009, domestic disturbances resulted in the police being called to their home in Belsize Park on three occasions. Bean and Sutcliffe's separation was announced on 6 August 2010, and a decree nisi was granted on 21 December 2010. He married Ashley Moore on 30 June 2017.

Bean has been a fan of Sheffield United F.C. (the "Blades") since he was eight years old, and has a tattoo on his left shoulder that reads "100% Blade". He opened their Hall of Fame in 2001 and, after making a six-figure contribution to the club's finances, was on their board of directors between 2002 and 2007 to help raise the profile of the club. He stepped down in 2007 to "go back to being an ordinary supporter" where he feels at home. During his time there, he had a dispute with Neil Warnock, former manager of Sheffield United, after Warnock claimed that Bean stormed into his office and shouted at him in front of his wife and daughter when the club had just been relegated from the Premier League. Bean denies it, calling Warnock "bitter" and "hypocritical". He wrote the foreword and helped to promote a book of anecdotes called Sheffield United FC: The Biography (2006). He also follows Yorkshire County Cricket Club.

Bean has a tattoo of the number nine on his shoulder, written using Tengwar, in reference to his involvement in the Lord of the Rings films and that his character was one of the original nine companions of the Company of the Ring. Seven of the other actors of "The Fellowship" (Elijah Wood, Sean Astin, Orlando Bloom, Billy Boyd, Ian McKellen, Dominic Monaghan and Viggo Mortensen) have the same tattoo, while John Rhys-Davies, whose character was also one of the original nine companions, arranged for his stunt double to get the tattoo instead.

Aligned with the British left, in 2015 Bean expressed support for Jeremy Corbyn and for "old Labour", the era before Tony Blair rebranded the party as New Labour; Bean also spoke of his admiration for Tony Benn.

Bean is a Christian and a gardener in his spare time. He also hosts a popular ornithology podcast Get Birding.

== Filmography ==
=== Film ===
Year	Title	Role	Notes
1984	Winter Flight	Hooker	
1986	Caravaggio	Ranuccio	
1988	Stormy Monday	Brendan	
1989	How to Get Ahead in Advertising	Larry Frisk	
1989	The Fifteen Streets	Dominic O'Brien	
1989	War Requiem	German Soldier	
1990	Windprints	Anton	
1990	The Field	Tadhg McCabe	
1992	Patriot Games	Sean Miller	
1994	Shopping	Venning	
1994	Black Beauty	Farmer Grey	
1995	GoldenEye	Alec Trevelyan / Janus	
1996	When Saturday Comes	Jimmy Muir	
1997	Anna Karenina	Vronsky	
1998	Ronin	Spence	
1998	Airborn	Dave Toombs	
1999	Bravo Two Zero	Andy McNab	
2000	Essex Boys	Jason Locke	
2001	Don't Say a Word	Patrick Koster	
2001	The Lord of the Rings: The Fellowship of the Ring	Boromir	
2002	The Lord of the Rings: The Two Towers	Boromir	Extended edition only
2002	Equilibrium	Errol Partridge	
2002	Tom and Thomas	Paul Shepherd	
2003	The Lord of the Rings: The Return of the King	Boromir	
2003	The Big Empty	Cowboy	
2004	National Treasure	Ian Howe	
2004	Troy	Odysseus	
2005	North Country	Kyle Dodge	
2005	Flightplan	Captain Marcus Rich	
2005	The Island	Dr. Merrick	
2005	The Dark	James	
2006	Silent Hill	Chris Da Silva	
2007	The Hitcher	John Ryder	
2007	Outlaw	Danny Bryant	
2007	Far North	Loki	
2010	Black Death	Ulric	
2010	Percy Jackson & the Olympians: The Lightning Thief	Zeus	
2010	Cash	Pyke Kubic / Reese Kubic	
2010	Death Race 2	Markus Kane	Direct-to-DVD
2011	Age of Heroes	Jones	
2012	Cleanskin	Ewan	
2012	Soldiers of Fortune	Dimidov	
2012	Mirror Mirror	The King, Snow White's father	
2012	Silent Hill: Revelation	Christopher Da Silva / Harry Mason	
2014	Wicked Blood	Frank Stinson	
2015	The Snow Queen 2: The Snow King	Arrog	Voice
2015	Any Day	Vian	
2015	Jupiter Ascending	Stinger Apini	
2015	Pixels	Corporal Hill	
2015	The Martian	Mitch Henderson	
2016	The Young Messiah	Severus	
2016	Kingsglaive: Final Fantasy XV	King Regis	Voice
2017	Drone	Neil	
2017	Dark River	Richard Bell	
2017	The Unconquered	Narrator	Voice; short film
2018	Taniel	Narrator	Voice; short film
2020	Possessor	John Parse	
2020	Wolfwalkers	Bill Goodfellowe	Voice
2023	Mummies	Pharaoh	Voice
2023	Knights of the Zodiac	Alman Kiddo (Mitsumasa Kido)	
2024	Buffalo Kids	Outlaw Wilson	Voice
2025	Deep Cover	DS Billings	
2025	Anemone	Jem Stoker	
2026	The Isolate Thief	Fiddler John	
2026	Rogue Trooper	Colonel Dicey	Voice
TBA	The Yellow Tie		Completed

=== Television ===
Year	Title	Role	Notes
1984	The Bill	Horace Clark	Episode: "Long Odds"
1985	Exploits at West Poley	Scarred Man	Television film
1986	The Practice	Terry Donlan	2 episodes
1988	The Storyteller	The Prince	Episode: "The True Bride"
1988	Troubles	Capt. Bolton	Television film
1989	The Jim Henson Hour	Prince	Episode: "Musicians"
1990	Screen Two	Vic	Episode: "Small Vones"
1990	Lorna Doone	Carver Doone	Television film
1990	Wedded	Man	Television film
1991	4 Play	Smith	Episode: "In the Border Country"
1991	Screen One	Gabriel Lewis / Jack Morgan	2 episodes
1991	Clarissa	Lovelace	4 episodes
1992	Inspector Morse	Alex Bailey	Episode: "Absolute Conviction"
1992	Fool's Gold: The Story of the Brink's-Mat Robbery	Micky McAvoy	Television film
1992	My Kingdom for a Horse	Steve	Television film
1993	Sharpe's Rifles	Sergeant/Lieutenant Richard Sharpe	Television film
1993	Sharpe's Eagle	Captain Richard Sharpe	Television film
1993	Lady Chatterley	Mellors	4 episodes
1993	A Woman's Guide to Adultery	Paul	3 episodes
1994	Jacob	Esau	Television film
1994	Sharpe's Company	Captain Richard Sharpe	Television film
1994	Sharpe's Enemy	Major Richard Sharpe	Television film
1994	Sharpe's Honour	Major Richard Sharpe	Television film
1994	Scarlett	Lord Richard Fenton	3 episodes
1995	Sharpe's Gold	Major Richard Sharpe	Television film
1995	Sharpe's Battle	Major Richard Sharpe	Television film
1995	Sharpe's Sword	Major Richard Sharpe	Television film
1996	Decisive Weapons	Narrator	Documentary
1996	Sharpe's Regiment	Major Richard Sharpe	Television film
1996	Sharpe's Siege	Major Richard Sharpe	Television film
1996	Sharpe's Mission	Major Richard Sharpe	Television film
1997	Sharpe's Revenge	Major Richard Sharpe	Television film
1997	Sharpe's Justice	Major Richard Sharpe	Television film
1997	Sharpe's Waterloo	Lieutenant Colonel Richard Sharpe	Television film
1998	The Canterbury Tales	The Nun's Priest	Voice; Episode: "Leaving London"
1999	Bravo Two Zero	Andy McNab	Television film
1999	Extremely Dangerous	Niel Bryne	4 episodes
1999	The Vicar of Dibley	Himself	Episode: "Spring"
2003	Henry VIII	Robert Aske	Television film
2004	Pride	Dark	Voice; Television film
2006	Faceless	Eddie Prey	Unaired pilot
2006	Sharpe's Challenge	Sergeant/Colonel Richard Sharpe	Television film
2007	Once Upon a Time in Iran	Narrator	Voice; Documentary
2008	Crusoe	James Crusoe	4 episodes
2008	Sharpe's Peril	Colonel Richard Sharpe	Television film
2009	Red Riding	John Dawson	2 episodes
2010	The Lost Future	Amal	Television film
2011	Game of Thrones	Eddard "Ned" Stark	10 episodes
2012	Missing	Paul Winstone	8 episodes
2012	Accused	Simon / Tracie	Episode: "Tracie's Story"
2013	Family Guy	Portrait Griffin	Voice; Episode: "No Country Club for Old Men"
2014	Robot Chicken	Doctor Doom / North / Heathcliff	Voice; Episode: "Catdog on a Stick"
2014–2015	Legends	Martin Odum	20 episodes; also producer
2015–2017	The Frankenstein Chronicles	John Marlott	12 episodes; also co-producer
2015	Sean Bean on Waterloo	Himself (Presenter)	Documentary
2016	Wasted	Sean Bean	6 episodes
2016	Roman Empire: Reign of Blood	Narrator	Voice; Documentary
2017	Broken	Father Michael Kerrigan	6 episodes; also executive producer
2017	Yorkshire: A Year in the Wild	Narrator	Voice; Documentary
2018	Medici: Masters of Florence	Jacopo de' Pazzi	8 episodes
2018	The Oath	Tom Hammand	10 episodes
2018	Sally4Ever	Sean Bean	Episode #1.7
2019	Curfew	Errol "The General" Chambers	6 episodes
2019	World on Fire	Douglas Bennett	7 episodes
2020–2024	Snowpiercer	Mr. Wilford	24 episodes
2021	Time	Mark Cobden	3 episodes; also executive producer
2022	Marriage	Ian	4 episodes
2024	Shardlake	Thomas Cromwell	2 episodes
2025	Original Gangsters with Sean Bean	Himself (Presenter)	4 episodes
2025–2026	This City Is Ours	Ronnie Phelan	7 episodes
2025–present	Robin Hood	Sheriff of Nottingham	Main role

=== Video games ===
Year	Title	Voice role	Notes
1997	GoldenEye 007	Alec Trevelyan	Likeness
2002	The Lord of the Rings: The Two Towers	Boromir	
2006	The Elder Scrolls IV: Oblivion	Martin Septim	
2012	Lego The Lord of the Rings	Boromir	
2013	Papa Sangre II	Narrator / Guide	
2013	Train Simulator 2014	Narrator	Marketing trailer only
2014	Train Simulator 2015	Narrator	Marketing trailer only
2015	Kholat	Narrator	
2015	Life Is Feudal	Narrator	
2016	Sid Meier's Civilization VI	Narrator	
2018	Sid Meier's Civilization VI: Rise and Fall	Narrator	
2018	Hitman 2	Mark Faba	Voice and likeness
2019	Sid Meier's Civilization VI: Gathering Storm	Narrator	
2019	A Plague Tale: Innocence	Narrator	Marketing trailer only
2025	The Elder Scrolls IV: Oblivion Remastered	Martin Septim	Archival recordings

=== Music videos ===
Year	Artist	Title	Role
2002	Moby	"We Are All Made of Stars"	Himself

=== Voice over ===
Year	Brand	Project	Role
2026	Nat Geo Wild	Primal Combat	Narrator
2002–present	O2	TV adverts	Voice over

== Awards and honours ==
In his home city of Sheffield, he has received several honours and acclaims, including an honorary doctorate from Sheffield Hallam University in 1997 and a Doctor of Letters in English Literature from the University of Sheffield in July 2007. He was selected as one of the inaugural members of Sheffield Legends (the Sheffield equivalent of the Hollywood Walk of Fame) and a plaque in his honour has been placed in front of Sheffield Town Hall. Bean commented: "I did get a doctorate from Sheffield Hallam University about 11 or 12 years ago so now I'm a double doctor. But this was wonderful, especially from my home city."

Year	Award	Category	Nominated work	Result
2002	Phoenix Film Critics Society Award	Best Acting Ensemble	The Lord of the Rings: The Fellowship of the Ring	Won
2002	Empire Award	Best British Actor	The Lord of the Rings: The Fellowship of the Ring	Nominated
2002	Screen Actors Guild Award	Outstanding Performance by a Cast in a Motion Picture	The Lord of the Rings: The Fellowship of the Ring	Nominated
2002	DVD Exclusive Award	Best Audio Commentary, New Release	The Lord of the Rings: The Fellowship of the Ring	Nominated
2003	Online Film Critics Society Award	Best Ensemble	The Lord of the Rings: The Two Towers	Won
2003	Phoenix Film Critics Society Award	Best Acting Ensemble	The Lord of the Rings: The Two Towers	Nominated
2003	DVD Exclusive Award	Best Audio Commentary, New Release	The Lord of the Rings: The Two Towers	Nominated
2004	Phoenix Film Critics Society Award	Best Acting Ensemble	The Lord of the Rings: The Return of the King	Won
2004	Screen Actors Guild Award	Outstanding Performance by a Cast in a Motion Picture	The Lord of the Rings: The Return of the King	Won
2004	Critics' Choice Award	Best Acting Ensemble	The Lord of the Rings: The Return of the King	Won
2004	National Board of Review	Best Acting by an Ensemble	The Lord of the Rings: The Return of the King	Won
2010	Screamfest Horror Film Festival	Best Actor	Black Death	Won
2011	Portal Award	Best Actor	Game of Thrones	Won
2011	IGN Summer Movie Award	Best Television Hero	Game of Thrones	Won
2011	IGN People's Choice Award	Best Television Hero	Game of Thrones	Won
2011	EWwy Award	Best Actor in a Drama	Game of Thrones	Nominated
2011	Scream Award	Best Ensemble	Game of Thrones	Nominated
2011	Scream Award	Best Fantasy Actor	Game of Thrones	Nominated
2012	Screen Actors Guild Award	Outstanding Performance by an Ensemble in a Drama Series	Game of Thrones	Nominated
2012	Saturn Award	Best Actor on Television	Game of Thrones	Nominated
2012	Fangoria Chainsaw Award	Best Actor	Black Death	Nominated
2013	International Emmy Award	Best Actor	Accused	Won
2013	Royal Television Society Awards	Best Actor	Accused	Won
2013	BAFTA Award	Leading Actor	Accused	Nominated
2013	People's Choice Award	Favorite Cable TV Actor	Legends	Nominated
2017	Royal Television Society NW	Best Performance in a Single Drama or Drama Series (Male)	Broken	Won
2017	Cologne Film Festival	Hollywood Reporter Award	Himself	Won
2018	BAFTA Award	Leading Actor	Broken	Won
2022	BAFTA Award	Leading Actor	Time	Won
2022	BAFTA Award	Best Mini-Series	Time	Won
