= The Hip Hop Years =

The Hip Hop Years is a three part series of one hour television documentaries, made for Channel 4 in 1999. It was accompanied by a book and compilation CD.

== Media ==
The series was devised by David Upshal who produced, directed and narrated the series. The series charts the definitive story of Hip Hop, rising from the streets of the Bronx to become, what Upshal calls, "the new Rock'n'Roll". The programmes combine archive clips and performance from TV, movies and music videos with specially shot material and interviews with key players.

Contributors include Chuck D and Hank Shocklee from Public Enemy, Darryl McDaniels from Run-D.M.C., Rza from The Wu Tang Clan, Ice-T, Eminem, Vanilla Ice, MC Hammer, Ice Cube, Tom Silverman, Russell Simmons, Rick Rubin, Fab Five Freddy, Afrika Bambaataa, Melle Mel, Grandmaster Flash and Kool DJ Herc.

- Programme One - Close to the Edge
- Programme Two - The New Rock'n'Roll
- Programme Three - Hip Hop Nation

He also produced the 33-track compilation CD which accompanied the series and co-wrote the book with Alex Ogg, also titled The Hip Hop Years.

- The Hip Hop Years: A History of Rap by Alex Ogg, David Upshal (1999, Fromm International) ISBN 9780880642637

== Reception ==
It was nominated for the BAFTA Hew Wheldon Award for Best Arts Programme in 2000.
