= They Don't Know =

They Don't Know may refer to:

- "They Don't Know" (Kirsty MacColl song), 1979, later a hit for Tracey Ullman
- "They Don't Know" (Jon B. song), 1998
- They Don't Know (So Solid Crew album), 2001
  - "They Don't Know" (So Solid Crew song), 2001
- "They Don't Know" (Paul Wall song), 2005
- "They Don't Know" (Savage song), 2005
- "They Don't Know" (Disciples song), 2015
- They Don't Know (Jason Aldean album), 2016
  - "They Don't Know" (Jason Aldean song), 2016
- "They Don't Know", a song by Amar Mohile and Kunal Ganjawala from the 2005 Indian film Ek Ajnabee
- "They Don't Know", a song by Ariana Grande from Trolls, 2016
- "They Don't Know", a song from the musical Thoroughly Modern Millie
- "They Don't Know", a song by Rico Love

== See also ==
- They Know (disambiguation)
