= Vietnam: The Camera at War =

1995 television documentary

- Directed by: David Upshal

Production
- Producer: David Upshal
- Running time: 40 Minutes
- Production company: BBC

Original release
- Network: BBC Two
- Release: 1995

Vietnam: The Camera at War is a television documentary originally broadcast on BBC2 in 1995 as a special edition of the arts strand The Late Show marking the 20th anniversary of the end of the Vietnam War. It tells the story of the war through its most iconic photographs (such as The Burning Monk and The Napalm Girl, etc.)

The documentary is produced and directed by David Upshal.

It is notable stylistically for delivering a narrative with little commentary and few moving images, told through still photographs and the voices of the photographers who took them.

Contributors include Tim Page, Don McCullin, Nick Ut, Philip Jones Griffiths, Malcolm Browne, Eddie Adams, David Burnett and Wallace Terry.
