= 21 Seconds =

2001 single by So Solid Crew

Single by So Solid Crew

from the album They Don't Know
- Released: 6 August 2001
- Genre: 2-step garage
- Length: 5:03 (album version); 3:54 (radio edit)
- Label: Relentless
- Songwriters: Lisa Maffia; Megaman; Skat D; Kaish; Synth; Mac; Face; Asher D; G-Man; Romeo; Harvey
- Producer: Synth

So Solid Crew singles chronology
"Oh No (Sentimental Things)" (2000)	"21 Seconds" (2001)	"They Don't Know" (2001)

Music video
- "21 Seconds" on YouTube

"21 Seconds" is a song by UK garage group So Solid Crew. Released as the second single from their 2001 debut album They Don't Know, it was the first of five consecutive top-20 hit singles for the group.

== Composition and production ==
The song uses fairly stripped back production, utilising a 2-step rhythm which was common in UK garage at the time. Lisa Maffia's young daughter, Chelsea, can be heard at the beginning of the track, saying "Ha, ha, ha, whatcha laughin at?"

The song title alludes to the approximate 21 seconds that each of the band members is given to perform their rap. 21 seconds is arrived at as the song's tempo is approximately 140BPM, has a key of G minor, and each rapper has 12 bars of 4 beats (48 beats at 140BPM, when worked out to the nearest integer, rounds to 21 seconds). Megaman said the crew created the track after their label told them to make a track lasting three and a half minutes. He said "so we worked out that with at least 10 or 11 members, that's eight bars each – 21 seconds. It was a simple calculation." Their label manager Shabs Jobanputra said "they literally took a calculator and divided the time by the number of MCs."

== Music video ==
The music video for "21 Seconds" was directed by Max Giwa and Dania Pasquini and was released in 2001. It features So Solid Crew performing during the storm in front of fences full of people dancing. It heavily uses special effects such as the storm, clouds, helicopters, lightning, tornado, etc.

The music video received the award for British Video of the Year at the 2002 Brit Awards.

== Critical reception ==
In a 2002 review, Pete Paphides in The Guardian said the track was "a brilliant idea" but that "not a single member of the collective uses their time to say anything remotely insightful." In September 2019, NME included the song in their "25 essential UK garage anthems" list. In a 2020 retrospective review of the single, The Quietus said the track "managed to capture the excitement of clubs and pirate radio, with MCs frantically passing the mic as they try to outdo each other in lyrical prowess, creative aggression bubbling beneath the surface." The same year, The Guardian placed the song at number 48 on their list of "The 100 Greatest UK No 1 Singles".

== Commercial performance ==
"21 Seconds" reached number one on the UK Singles Chart in August 2001, selling 118,135 copies in its opening week and becoming 2001's 19th best-selling single. Its total sales reached 423,000. The single also peaked at number 24 in Ireland.

== Track listings ==
UK CD single

1. "21 Seconds" (original So Solid version)
2. "21 Seconds" (12-inch version)
3. "21 Seconds" (DJ Swiss & Dan Da Man remix vocal)
4. "21 Seconds" (video)

UK 12-inch single

A1. "21 Seconds" (original So Solid version)
A2. "21 Seconds" (12-inch version)
B1. "21 Seconds" (DJ Swiss & Dan Da Man remix vocal)
B2. "21 Seconds" (DJ Swiss & Dan Da Man remix instrumental)

UK cassette single

1. "21 Seconds" (original So Solid version)
2. "21 Seconds" (12-inch version)

European CD1

1. "21 Seconds" (Seven Gemini remix)
2. "21 Seconds" (radio edit) – 3:54

European CD2

1. "21 Seconds" (Seven Gemini remix)
2. "21 Seconds" (Seven Gemini remix instrumental)
3. "21 Seconds" (radio edit)
4. "21 Seconds" (Seven Gemini remix video)

== Charts ==
=== Weekly charts ===
Chart (2001)	Peak position
Australia (ARIA)	59
Europe (Eurochart Hot 100)	11
Ireland (IRMA)	24
Ireland Dance (IRMA)	6
Netherlands (Single Top 100)	45
Scottish Singles Sales (Official Charts)	9
UK Singles (Official Charts)	1
UK Dance (Official Charts)	1

=== Year-end charts ===
Chart (2001)	Position
UK Singles (OCC)	19

== Certifications ==
Region	Certification	Certified units/sales
United Kingdom (BPI)	Platinum	600,000^{‡}
^{‡} Sales+streaming figures based on certification alone.

== Release history ==
Region	Date	Format(s)	Label(s)	Ref(s).
United Kingdom	6 August 2001	12-inch vinyl; CD; cassette	Relentless	
Australia	22 October 2001	CD	Relentless	

== Other versions ==
Romeo reworked "21 Seconds" for car insurance firm Confused.com in 2013. The same year, Preditah reworked the track.

On 6 September 2019, So Solid Crew went to the Red Bull Music Studios, London, and remixed "21 Seconds" with Toddla T. They were joined by D Double E, Ms Banks and DJ Q as they added new verses.

As of 2024, East Midlands Railway has run its "32 Minutes" campaign, with a jingle based around "21 Seconds" to promote the fact that the journey time of the Luton Express service from Luton Airport to London takes 32 minutes. In 2025, the advertisements won "Campaign of the Year" at the National Transport Awards. Also in 2024 Dawn Butler, the Labour Party candidate for Brent East, released a campaign video called "21 Days", where she parodied "21 Seconds" to encourage people to vote in the 2024 United Kingdom general election.
