= Bad Girl (At Night) =

Single by Dave Spoon featuring Lisa Maffia
- Released: 10 September 2007
- Recorded: 2007
- Genre: Electro house
- Length: 3:07
- Label: Apollo Recordings
- Songwriter(s): Lisa Maffia, Harry Wilkins, Si Hulbert, Simon Neale
- Producer(s): Si Hulbert

Lisa Maffia singles chronology
"Shake 4 Daddy" (2005)	"Bad Girl (At Night)" (2007)	"Since You Went Away" (2010)

"Bad Girl (At Night)" is a song by Dave Spoon, featuring Lisa Maffia on vocals. It was released as a digital download single on 27 August 2007, followed by a CD release on 1 September through Apollo Recordings. The music video shows Maffia in a house set around people with hangovers. It reached the top 10 in Finland. In the UK, the song peaked at No. 36.

== Charts ==
Chart performance for "Bad Girl (At Night)"
Chart (2007)	Peak position
Finland (Suomen virallinen lista)	10
UK Singles (OCC)	36
