= Decisive Weapons =

- Presented by: Sean Bean
- Country of origin: United Kingdom
- No. of series: 2
- No. of episodes: 12

Production
- Producer: Martin Davidson

Original release
- Network: BBC Two
- Release: 1996 – 1997

Decisive Weapons is a television series made by the BBC in association with the US channel A&E. It ran for two years airing on BBC2 in the UK from 1996 to 1997.

The series was devised and produced by Martin Davidson who also co-wrote the book Decisive Weapons with series researcher Adam Levy.

== Episodes ==
=== Series One (1996) ===
- "Queen of Tanks" – T-34 at the Battle of Kursk (dir: John Farren)
- "Vietnam Warhorse" – Bell Huey Helicopter in the Battle of Ia Drang (dir: Paul Tilzey)
- "Cadillac of the Skies" – P-51 Mustang at the Battle of Berlin (dir: David Upshal)
- "Cold Steel" – the Bayonet at the Battle of Culloden (dir: Paul Tilzey)
- "Wood Against Steel" – the English longbow at the Battle of Agincourt (dir: Adam Levy)
- "Jumping Jet Flash" – Harrier jump jet in the Falklands War (dir: David Upshal)

=== Series Two (1997) ===
- "The Forgotten Fighter" – Hawker Hurricane in the Battle of Britain (dir: Liz Hartford)
- "Wings Over The Ocean" – the aircraft carrier at the Battle of Midway (dir: David Upshal)
- "Lock, Stock And Barrel" – Springfield Rifle in the American Civil War (dir: Daniel Gold)
- "U-Boat Killer" – the Anti-Submarine Warship in the Battle of the Atlantic (dir: Paul Tilzey)
- "Soul of the Samurai" – the Japanese Samurai Sword (dir: Navid Akhtar)
- "Darkness Visible" – F-117 Stealth Fighter in the Gulf War (dir: Paul Tilzey)
