= Days That Shook the World =

2003 British documentary series

- Genre: Documentary; History
- Country of origin: United Kingdom
- Original language: English
- No. of series: 3
- No. of episodes: 30

Production
- Executive producers: David Upshal; Richard Bradley; Chris Kelly
- Producers: David Bartlett; Stuart Elliott
- Running time: 60 minutes

Original release
- Network: BBC Two
- Release: 17 September 2003

Days That Shook the World is a British documentary television series that premiered on BBC Two on 17 September 2003 and lasted for three series. Each 60-minute episode explores either one or two significant events from history through a combination of dramatisation, archive footage, and eyewitness accounts.

It was produced by Lion Television and distributed internationally by BBC Worldwide. It has been broadcast on the BBC, ABC, Discovery Channel UK, The History Channel and Viasat History.

The BBC released all three series on DVD and published a book written by Hugo Davenport to accompany the first series.

The series was also released on DVD by the Polish edition of Newsweek in 2007.

== Episodes ==
Series	Episode	Title
	Pilot	First in Flight: The Wright Brothers/Apollo 11 Moon Landing
1	1	The Coronation of Elizabeth II/The Death of Diana
1	2	The Assassination of Franz Ferdinand/The Death of Adolf Hitler
1	3	The Assassination of Martin Luther King Jr./The Release of Nelson Mandela
1	4	Hiroshima
1	5	The Murder of the Romanovs/The Fall of the Berlin Wall
1	6	Kristallnacht/The Birth of Israel
1	7	Tutankhamun's Tomb/Deciphering the Rosetta Stone
1	8	Black September Hijackings/Lockerbie
1	9	First Nuclear Reaction/Chernobyl
1	10	The Assassination of JFK/The Resignation of Nixon
1	11	Marconi's First Transatlantic Radio Transmission/Concorde's First Transatlantic Flight
1	12	Faster than Sound: Chuck Yeager/Donald Campbell
2	1	Disaster in the Sky: The Hindenburg/Challenger Disaster
2	2	The Christmas Truce
2	3	Attack on Pearl Harbor
2	4	Grand Heist: The Theft of the Crown Jewels/The Great Train Robbery
2	5	Conspiracy to Kill: The Real Day of the Jackal/Wolf's Lair
2	6	Reach for the Stars: Trials of Galileo/Yuri Gagarin's Flight
2	7	Dinosaurs & Duplicity: Discovery of the First Dinosaur/Piltdown Man
2	8	Terrorism: Assassination of Abraham Lincoln/Oklahoma City bombing
2	9	Cold War Spies: 1960 U-2 incident/Spy swap of Abel, Pryor and Powers
2	10	Affairs of the Crown: The Execution of Anne Boleyn/The Abdication of Edward VIII
3	1	The Cost of Betrayal: The Defection of Burgess & MacLean/The Execution of the Rosenbergs
3	2	Rule of the Gun: The O.K. Corral/Saint Valentine's Day Massacre
3	3	Fact or Fiction: The War of the Worlds/Hitler Diaries
3	4	The War to End All Wars
3	5	Let Freedom Ring: The Boston Tea Party/The Independence of India
3	6	Battle for the Holy City: The Six-Day War
3	7	The Battle of Midway
3	8	The Road To Revolution: The Execution of Ceauşescu/The Iranian Revolution
