= Lisa Maffia =

British musician (born 1979)

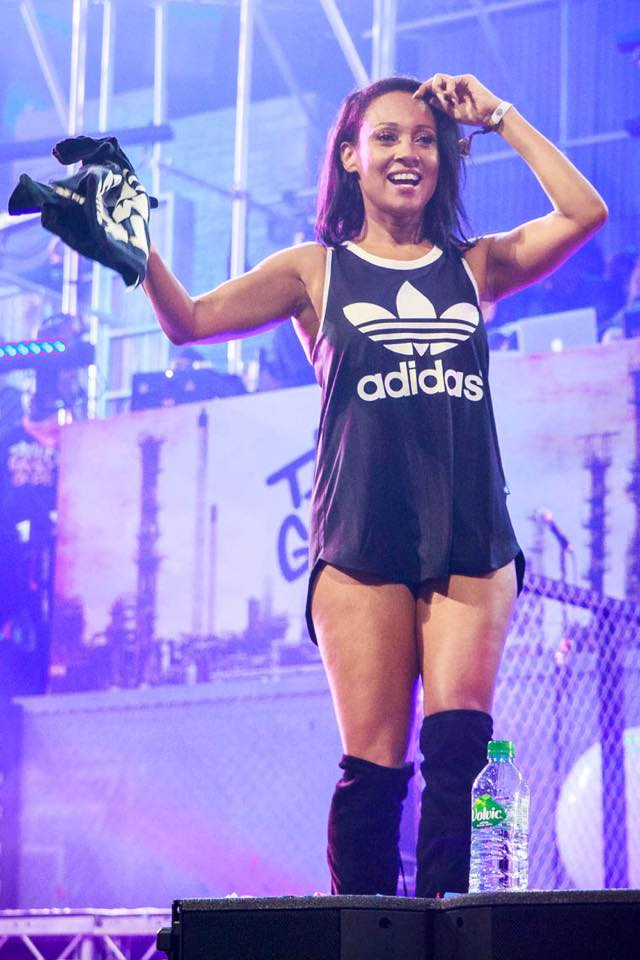
- Lisa Maffia in 2016

Background information
- Born: Lisa Maffia; 16 June 1979 (age 47)
- Origin: London, England
- Genres: R&B; hip hop; UK garage; electro house
- Occupations: Singer; songwriter; musician; rapper; model; author; presenter
- Years active: 1998–present
- Labels: Independiente; Epic Records; Maffia Recordz; Universal; Vivifier Records
- Member of: So Solid Crew

Lisa Maffia (born 16 June 1979) is a British singer-songwriter, musician, rapper, actress, fashion designer, model and presenter, who originally came to the public's attention as the main female member of So Solid Crew. Whilst in So Solid Crew, the singer notched up five top 20 hits, including a Platinum-selling single "21 Seconds" and a Platinum-selling album They Don't Know. As a solo artist, she has released two top 10 singles and an award-winning album including the Platinum-selling single "All Over". Her most recent release to date was 2017's "Wah Gwarn". Maffia is mixed-race, born to a half-Italian mother and a Jamaican father.

== Biography ==
Maffia was born as Lisa Maffia in Brixton, London, the daughter of a Jamaican father and an Anglo-Italian mother, Shirley Maffia. Through her mother, Maffia is a second cousin of actress Louisa Lytton: Maffia's mother Shirley and Lytton's mother Jane Nastri are first cousins. Maffia has a daughter, Chelsea, born when she was 18. She trained in Latin, ballroom, tap and modern dancing and practised gymnastics as a child. She attended Norwood School in West Norwood. Maffia then went on to Brixton College to do a diploma in Photography and Art & Design. In 2000, Maffia made her recording debut when she added her vocals to the So Solid Crew track "Oh No".

On 6 August 2001, whilst with So Solid Crew, "21 Seconds" was released. The single topped the UK Singles Chart in August 2001. The single also won Best British Video at the 2002 BRIT Awards. With the success of "21 Seconds", the crew went on to release their debut album They Don't Know which ending up going Platinum.

On 21 April 2003, departing from So Solid Crew, Maffia made her solo debut at number 2 with "All Over". It spent three weeks in the top 10. She then released "In Love" which reached number 13. This led to the singer releasing her debut solo album, First Lady. Promo for the album included support slots for artists such as Christina Aguilera, Ashanti, Loudbankcoast, Ja Rule, Daniel Bedingfield and Blue. The album failed to match the success of its singles, reaching number 44 on the UK Albums Chart, and led her to leave her record label. Maffia also performed her single "All Over" at the MOBO Awards.

Taking a break from music, Maffia took part in the Channel 4 reality TV show The Games. She earned a silver medal behind Kirsty Gallacher. After The Games, Maffia set up her own independent record label, Maffia Recordz, on which she released her underground single "Shake 4 Daddy" and signed acts such as North Star and Romeo. The label also signed the soundtrack to the film, Rollin with the Nines.

In May 2007, Maffia announced on her official Myspace that she had been recording her upcoming album at the Murlyn Studios, known to have written songs for Christina Milian, Madonna, Kylie Minogue and others. On 10 September, Maffia released her single "Bad Girl"; whilst the single reached 36 and number 4 in the overall dance charts, the single had success over Europe leading to Maffia doing a European tour. On 20 August 2008, it was announced that Maffia would participate in ITV2's CelebAir, in which cameras followed her and other celebrities as they work as air hostesses. Maffia won CelebAir on 23 October 2008.

Maffia updated via Twitter that she recorded every other week (during January 2009 to August 2009), working with various producers including Roger Sanchez and Bloodshy & Avant and to expect a surprise US star. She also recorded four songs for the comeback album of So Solid Crew including "Since You Went Away", the video of which was shot in June 2009.

In January 2010, Maffia released and toured with So Solid Crew on their single "Since You Went Away". The track reached the top 10 in the independent singles chart, leading to various performances on Big Brother's Big Mouth, Channel 5's Five Live and Radio One's Live Lounge.

In March 2012, Maffia announced her underground single titled "Don't Stop the Music", featuring Maffia Recordz signees MC Romeo and Tyler Daley. Its worldwide premiere was aired on BBC's 1Xtra on 8 April 2012, and then went on to be released in July 2012. On 22 July, Maffia announced via Twitter she would be teaming up with Aggro Santos on a new track produced by Paul Morrell. Maffia also appeared on Peter Andre's album Angels & Demons on a track titled "X".

In July 2017, on BBC's 1Xtra, Maffia premiered "Wah Gwarn", the first single from her new album. Maffia also announced she would be executive producer for UK film Little Lighty, the first film to be produced under Maffia Media (Lisa's production company). In 2019, she presented her own music cooking show on BritAsia TV called Certified.

In April 2026, Maffia announced via Instagram the release of her debut autobiography 'First Lady' to be released in November 2026 coinciding with her second studio album.

== Awards ==
=== 2001 ===
MOBO Awards

- Best UK Garage Act (with So Solid Crew) – winner
- Best UK Newcomer (with So Solid Crew) – winner
- Best UK Act (with So Solid Crew) – nominated

=== 2002 ===
Brit Awards

- Best British Video (with So Solid Crew) for "21 Seconds" – winner
- Best British Newcomer (with So Solid Crew) – nominated
- Best British Single (with So Solid Crew) – nominated

MOBO Awards

- Best UK Garage Act (with So Solid Crew) – nominated

Dancestar World Dance Music Awards

- Best UK Garage Act – winner

=== 2003 ===
MOBO Awards

- Best UK Garage Act – winner
- Best UK Act – nominated
- Best UK Newcomer – nominated

=== 2004 ===
MOBO Awards

- Best UK Garage Act (with So Solid Crew) – winner

=== 2018 ===
Black Magic Awards

- Music Honour – winner

== Discography ==
=== Albums ===
- First Lady (2003)

=== Singles ===
Year	Title	Chart positions							Album
Year	Title	UK	UK R&B	UK Dance	AUS	NZ	NLD	SCO	Album
2000	"Oh No (Sentimental Things) / Dilemma" (with So Solid Crew)	—	—	—	—	—	—	—	They Don't Know
2000	"No Good 4 Me" (Oxide & Neutrino feat. Megaman, Romeo & Lisa Maffia)	6	—	3	—	—	—	—	Execute
2001	"21 Seconds" (with So Solid Crew)	1	1	1	—	—	45	9	They Don't Know
2002	"Romeo Dunn" (Romeo featuring Lisa Maffia, Tiger S & Thug Angel)	3	2	—	—	—	—	20	Solid Love
2003	"All Over"	2	1	—	42	23	42	9	First Lady
2003	"In Love"	13	4	—	—	—	—	31	First Lady
2003	"Women of the World"	77	19	—	—	—	—	—	First Lady
2005	"Shake 4 Daddy"	—	—	—	—	—	—	—	Non-album single
2007	"Bad Girl (At Night)" (Dave Spoon feat. Lisa Maffia)	36	—	4	—	—	—	31	Non-album single
2010	"Since You Went Away" (So Solid Crew feat. Lisa Maffia and MC Romeo)	82	31	10	—	—	—	—	Non-album single
2012	"Don't Stop the Music" (Lisa Maffia feat. MC Romeo and Tyler Daley)	—	—	—	—	—	—	—	Non-album single
2017	"Wah Gwarn"	9	—	—	—	—	—	—	Non-album single
2026	"Fever" (Lisa Maffia and Molly Mouse)	—	—	—	—	—	—	—	Non-album single

=== Guest appearances ===
- Deeper Part 2 - Romeo feat. Lisa Maffia

Released: 2002

- X - Peter Andre feat. Lisa Maffia

Released: 2013

- Walk This Way - Rev Run feat. Lisa Maffia Released: 2014
- Shine - FooR feat. Lisa Maffia

Released: 2018

- Bashdrill Remix - Shaqy Dread feat. Lisa Maffia, D-Live, J Kaz, Munie, & Big Zeeks

Released: 2020

== Concert tours ==
Year	Title	Duration	Shows
2003	Blues & Soul/First Lady Tour	1 April 2003 – 20 July 2003 (England)	30
The First Lady Tour (also known as the Blues & Soul Tour) was a series of short concert-like promotional appearances at University and club-type venues by Lisa Maffia that took place from April to July 2003.
2013	They Don't Know Tour	21 March 2013 – 5 October 2013 (England)	5
The They Don't Know Tour is Lisa Maffia's first official tour with So Solid Crew. Dates are: 21 March 2013 – IndigO2, London 2 October 2013 – Waterfront, Norwich, 3 October 2013 – The Institute, Birmingham, 4 October 2013 – The Ritz, Manchester, 5 October 2013 – The O2 Arena, London

== Bibliography ==
Maffia has written an autobiography.

- Maffia, Lisa. First Lady. Mirror Books, 05/11/2026. ISBN 9781918517149

== Filmography ==
=== Films ===
- The Living Dead (2020)
- Time To Collect (2021)
- RoadGirl (2023)

=== Documentaries ===
- This Is So Solid (2001)
- 25 Years of UK Garage (2022)

=== Television ===
- Top of the Pops (2001, 2002, 2003)
- MOBO Awards (2001, 2002, 2003, 2005, 2013)
- BRIT Awards (2002)
- Friday Night with Jonathan Ross (2003)
- CDUK (2003)
- Spring Break Live (2003)
- Smile (2003)
- The Games (2004)
- Never Mind The Buzzcocks (2004, 2008)
- Liquid News (2004)
- Hell’s Kitchen (2004)
- Big Brother’s Big Mouth (2004, 2005)
- Deadline (2007)
- CelebAir-Winner (2008)
- Ant & Dec’s Saturday Night Takeaway (2009)
- The Real Hustle (2009)
- Celebrity Big Brother’s Big Mouth (2010)
- Live From Studio Five (2010)
- The Wright Stuff (2010)
- Celebrity Juice (2012)
- When Television Goes Horribly Wrong (2017)
- Certified with Lisa Maffia (2018)
- Don’t Hate The Playaz (2018)
- Pointless Celebrities (2018, 2019)
- Celebrity Coach Trip (2019)-Joint winner with Mutya Buena
- The All New Monty: Who Bares Wins (2019)
- Loose Women (2019)
- Trace Vault (2020, 2022)
- Celebrity Hunted (2022)
- Celeb MMA (2022)
- Good Morning Britain (2022)
- First Ladies of Hip Hop (2023)
- Top Of The Pops: The Story of 2001 (2026)

== Modelling ==
Having modelled for Vogue, Elle and a range of women's and men's magazines, Maffia has also appeared in magazine polls. She ranked No. 91 (2002) in FHM's 100 Sexiest Women and ranked No. 77 (2002) in Loaded's Hot 100 Babes. In September 2007, Maffia was voted number 33 in the top 50 sexiest brunettes poll in Nuts magazine.

== Business and ventures ==
In 2012, Lisa founded her own interior design and home staging company, House of Maffia.

In 2020, Lisa launched Salon 48, a hair and beauty salon in Margate. The same year, she also opened Lyrical UK, a music industry personalised message service featuring artists from the UK Garage scene.

In 2022, Lisa announced on Good Morning Britain the release of Maffia Rum, a line of alcoholic beverages.
