= They Don't Know (So Solid Crew song) =

Single by So Solid Crew

from the album They Don't Know
- Released: 5 November 2001
- Genre: UK garage
- Length: 5:10
- Label: Relentless
- Songwriters: Asher D, Dan Brazil, G-Man, Megaman, Synth
- Producer: Synth

So Solid Crew singles chronology
"21 Seconds" (2001)	"They Don't Know" (2001)	"Haters" (2002)

"They Don't Know" is a song by UK garage group So Solid Crew. It is the title track of their 2001 debut album and was released as the third single from the album on 5 November 2001. The song peaked at No. 3 on the UK Singles Chart, giving the group their second of five consecutive top-five hits.

== Track listings ==
UK CD single

1. "They Don't Know" (full length original version) – 5:10
2. "Envy" (vocal remix featuring Da Twins and Ms. Dynamite) – 5:47
3. "They Don't Know" (video)

UK 12-inch and cassette single

A. "They Don't Know" (full length original version) – 5:10
B. "Envy" (vocal remix featuring Da Twins and Ms. Dynamite) – 5:47

== Charts ==
=== Weekly charts ===
Chart (2001)	Peak position
Europe (Eurochart Hot 100)	14
Scotland Singles (OCC)	35
UK Singles (OCC)	3
UK Dance (OCC)	1

=== Year-end charts ===
Chart (2001)	Position
UK Singles (OCC)	138
