= So Solid Crew =

British UK garage group

- Origin: Battersea, London, England
- Genres: Hip hop; UK garage
- Years active: 1998–present
- Labels: Independiente Limited, Relentless
- Past members: Carl Morgan; A.M. SNiPER

So Solid Crew are a British UK garage and hip hop collective originating from Battersea, London, which achieved wide success in the early 2000s. The group consisted of many members, the most notable being Asher D (Ashley Walters), Lisa Maffia, Harvey and Romeo. So Solid have been credited for being pioneers in the UK music scene. By turning UK garage from a dance-leaning genre to one that was darker and more MC-oriented, and gaining mainstream success, they inspired London youth to experiment with their own darker sounds, leading to what would become known as grime music.

== Members ==
So Solid Crew is a large group which has expanded from 19 initial members to 30.

=== Confirmed members ===
- A.M. SNiPER
- AC Burrell
- Akira
- Asher D
- Carl Morgan
- Dan Da Man
- DJ Mex
- DJ PDS
- DJ Swiss
- Face
- Frost
- G-Man
- JD
- Kaish
- Kowdeen
- Lisa Maffia
- MC Harvey
- MC Mac
- Megaman
- Money
- Mr. Shabz
- Oxide & Neutrino
- PDs
- Radical
- Romeo
- Skat D
- Stampede
- Statix
- Squami
- Synth
- Thug Angel
- Tiger S
- Timeless
- The Twins
- Trigga
- TW7

There was also a sub-group of So Solid called So Solid Kids, which contained members Samantha, Skip, Frost, and Thrust. Skip and Frost hosted a 'So Solid Kids' show on Delight FM.

== Background ==
Before breaking into the mainstream market, So Solid Crew were involved with many pirate radio stations in London, such as Supreme FM and Delight FM. It was at Delight where they made their name, occupying most of the Sunday schedule, the so-called "So Solid Sundays". From around lunchtime until 10 pm, there were shows from different members, where the various So Solid Crew DJs would play 2-step garage tracks. At times, the So Solid Crew emcees would rap on top of tracks for up to two hours each session. On Christmas Day in 2001, So Solid Crew performed their last Sunday show on the station.

== History ==
So Solid Crew's first album, They Don't Know, was released in October 2001, followed by a remix album entitled Fuck It in December 2001. Their hit singles include "Oh No (Sentimental Things)" and "21 Seconds", the latter reaching number one on the UK Singles Chart in August 2001. Another hit, "They Don't Know", reached number three in November 2001 and "Haters" got to number eight in January 2002. "Ride wid Us" was less successful (UK number 19 in April 2002). They released the single "Broken Silence" in 2003 which was their fourth and final top 10 hit. The song spoke out about government prejudice which they felt they had faced.

In 2002, they were the subject of the Channel 4 television documentary This Is So Solid directed and narrated by David Upshal, later released on DVD by Universal along with a live performance. Members Harvey, Romeo and Lisa Maffia have all appeared on the Channel 4 celebrity reality show The Games. In 2012, Romeo and Harvey each appeared in a separate series of Celebrity Big Brother, in the 9th and 10th series respectively; they both finished in sixth place in their respective series. The band's former producer, Carl Morgan, was convicted of murder in October 2005. Group member Dwayne Vincent (Megaman) was also accused but was cleared after a retrial.

Harvey has gone solo and has produced tracks such as "We Ride" with Doom Man, Swiss, JME and Skepta. So Solid Crew MC Asher D went on to have an acting career appearing in 50 Cent's Get Rich or Die Tryin' and in the British films Bullet Boy and Life and Lyrics, while still making independent mixtapes and albums in the grime and UK hip hop scene.

So Solid member Swiss released "Cry" featuring Sharifa.

Trigger is now working with UK/US based producer Clyde Ward on his solo project JAX and featured on UK-based band The Fallen's debut album track, "Maybe".

In February 2013, the group announced its 2013 tour.

Also in 2013, Harvey and Asher D appeared alongside many other garage pioneers in a documentary exploring the legacy of UK garage, Rewind 4Ever: The History of UK Garage.

== Discography ==
=== Studio albums ===
Year	Album	UK Albums Chart
2001	They Don't Know	6
2003	2nd Verse	70
2013	The Greatest Hits	-

=== Compilations and mixtapes ===
- 2000 – MC Harvey and DJ Swiss of So Solid Crew Present UK Garage Mafia
- 2001 – Fuck It
- 2006 – The Time Is Now
- 2006 – Roll Deep Presents Grimey Vol. 1
- 2011 – So Solid Lost Tapes (Garage) Vol. 1
- 2011 – So Solid Lost Tapes (RNB) Vol. 2

=== Singles ===
List of singles, with selected chart positions
Title	Year	Peak chart positions		Album
Title	Year	UK	AUS	Album
"Oh No (Sentimental Things) / Dilemma"	2000	—	—	They Don't Know
"21 Seconds"	2001	1	59	They Don't Know
"They Don't Know"	2001	3	—	They Don't Know
"Haters"	2001	8	—	They Don't Know
"Ride wid Us"	2002	19	—	They Don't Know
"Broken Silence"	2003	9	—	2nd Verse
"So Grimey"	2004	62	—	2nd Verse
"Since You Went Away"	2010	82	—	
"UK Hot wid It"	2013	—	—	The Greatest Hits
