= Broken Silence (song) =

2003 single by So Solid Crew

Single by So Solid Crew

from the album 2nd Verse
- Released: 15 September 2003
- Length: 4.11
- Label: Independiente
- Songwriter(s): Rouiller Francis: Naqui Safi; Naqui Shabi
- Producer(s): Mr. Shabz

So Solid Crew singles chronology
"Ride wid Us" (2002)	"Broken Silence" (2003)	"So Grimey" (2004)

"Broken Silence" is a song by the UK garage act So Solid Crew. It was released on 15 September 2003 as the lead single from the group's second album 2nd Verse. The song reached number 9 on the UK Singles Chart. It spoke out against the government prejudice they felt they had faced.

It is the only known top 40 single in the UK to contain a 17-letter word: "institutionalised", found in the lyric "It's like we're imprisoned in the ghetto and it's getting to me / To the point where I'm feeling institutionalised". The video for the song was shot in Feltham, West London.

The song's hook is interpolated in "Lumidee", a 2021 song by Chip featuring Young Adz and Young M.A, from the album Snakes & Ladders.

== Track listing ==
1. "Broken Silence"
2. "Broken Version"
3. "2nd Verse"
4. "Broken Silence" (video)
