= 2nd Verse =

Studio album by So Solid Crew
- Released: 29 September 2003
- Recorded: 2002–03
- Genres: UK garage, hip-hop
- Length: 71.52
- Label: Independiente Limited
- Producers: G-Man, Megaman

So Solid Crew chronology
They Don't Know (2001)	2nd Verse (2003)

Singles from 2nd Verse
- 1. "Broken Silence" Released: 15 September 2003; 2. "So Grimey" Released: 22 March 2004

Professional ratings
Review scores
Source	Rating
The Guardian	3/5 stars
MusicOMH	favourable
The Telegraph	favourable
Yahoo! Music	8/10 stars

2nd Verse is the second album by UK garage and urban music collective So Solid Crew, and the follow-up to They Don't Know. It was released on 29 September 2003. It peaked at No. 70 on the UK Albums Chart, and contains the singles "Broken Silence" and "So Grimey".

== Track listing ==
1. "Intro"
2. "1st Verse"
3. "So Solid (Angry Beat)"
4. "So Grimy"
5. "Six 'o' Clock"
6. "More"
7. "How It Is"
8. "2nd Verse"
9. "Colder"
10. "Bou Bas (+ remix)"
11. "Leave Us Alone"
12. "Money Maker (G-Man)"
13. "Thug Angel's (Initiation)"
14. "Ghetto Anthem"
15. "Broken Silence"
16. "No Love"
17. "Outro"
