= Windrush (TV series) =

British TV documentary series

- Genre: Documentary
- Country of origin: United Kingdom
- Original language: English
- No. of seasons: 1
- No. of episodes: 4

Original release
- Network: BBC Two
- Release: 30 May – 20 June 1998

Windrush is a four-part series of one-hour television documentaries originally broadcast on BBC Two in 1998 to mark the 50th anniversary of the arrival in Britain of the HMT Empire Windrush, the ship that brought the first significant wave of post-war West Indian immigrants.

The series was produced and directed by David Upshal, and its Executive Producer was Trevor Phillips. It won the 1999 Royal Television Society Award for Best Documentary Series.

Contributors include Lenny Henry, Jazzie B, Doreen Lawrence, Valerie Amos, Rosalind Howells, Diane Abbott, Paul Boateng, Ben Bousquet, Carroll Thompson, Charlie Williams, Cy Grant, Professor Stuart Hall, Ken Livingstone, Darcus Howe, Linton Kwesi Johnson, Columbus Deniston, Ulric Cross, Chris Blackwell and Mike Phillips.

The four episodes were:

1. "Arrival" (30 May 1998)
2. "A New Generation" (6 June 1998)
3. "Intolerance" (13 June 1998)
4. "A Very British Story" (20 June 1998)

The series was accompanied by the book Windrush: The Irresistible Rise Of Multi-Racial Britain, written by Mike Phillips with Trevor Phillips, based on the extensive interviews conducted by producer/director David Upshal for the television series. The Independent newspaper described it as being "One of the most important books ever to have been published on the Black British experience".
