= David Upshal =

British television producer

- Born: United Kingdom
- Occupation: Television producer
- Years active: 1990–present

David Upshal is a British television producer. His work includes Victorian Farm, Victorian Pharmacy, Edwardian Farm, Wartime Farm, Tales from the Green Valley, Tudor Monastery Farm, The True Face of War, Days That Shook The World, Outbreak Investigation, Tony Benn: Free at Last, Gordon Brown's Missing Billions, Summer of Noise, The Gospel of Gospel, Pilgrimage with Simon Reeve, On Tour with the Queen, Lulu: Something to Shout About, Secrets of the Castle, The Hunt for the Arctic Ghost Ship and the historical skills game show Escape in Time, for which he is also credited as format devisor.

He previously directed the Channel 4 series The Hip Hop Years (short-listed for a BAFTA) and the landmark BBC series Windrush (winner of the 1999 Royal Television Society Award for Best Documentary Series). He began his television career at the BBC where his credits included The Late Show, Reportage, Reputations, Decisive Weapons and Vietnam: The Camera at War.

In 2017, he produced and directed The Seven Ages of Elvis, a 90-minute feature documentary broadcast by Sky Arts to mark the 40th anniversary of Elvis Presley.
