= They Don't Know (So Solid Crew album) =

Studio album by So Solid Crew
- Released: 19 November 2001
- Recorded: 2000–2001
- Genre: UK garage, hip hop
- Length: 76.38
- Label: Independiente, Relentless
- Producer: Megaman; G-Man

So Solid Crew chronology
| They Don't Know (2001) | 2nd Verse (2003) |

Professional ratings
Review scores
| Source | Rating |
|---|---|
| AllMusic | 3/5 stars |
| BBC | (favourable) |
| NME | (favourable) |

They Don't Know is the debut album by UK garage collective So Solid Crew, released on 19 November 2001. The album features the singles "Oh No (Sentimental Things)", "They Don't Know", "Haters", "Ride wid Us" and the UK singles chart-topper "21 Seconds".

The album's first single, "Oh No (Sentimental Things)", was ineligible for the UK singles charts due to the number of remixes included on the CD single, a decision which then-A&R Glyn Aikins claims was an oversight by the label.

== Track listing ==
All lyrics are written by So Solid Crew.

| No. | Title | Length |
|---|---|---|
| 1. | "Intro" | 0:54 |
| 2. | "Haters" | 4:18 |
| 3. | "Oh No (Sentimental Things) (Remix)" | 5:30 |
| 4. | "They Don't Know" | 5:11 |
| 5. | "Envy ("They Don't Know" Vocal Remix)" | 5:47 |
| 6. | "What Could U Do?" | 1:24 |
| 7. | "If It Was Me" | 4:09 |
| 8. | "Friend of Mine" | 3:53 |
| 9. | "Deeper" | 4:55 |
| 10. | "In My Life" | 5:11 |
| 11. | "Way Back When" | 1:24 |
| 12. | "Skyla" | 3:59 |
| 13. | "Woah" | 4:34 |
| 14. | "Solid Soul" | 1:36 |
| 15. | "Ride wid Us" | 4:48 |
| 16. | "Fuck wid Us" | 5:09 |
| 17. | "21 Seconds" | 5:01 |
| 18. | "Something New" | 3:46 |
| 19. | "Rave Scene" | 4:10 |
| 20. | "Outro" | 0:44 |
| Total length: | | 76:23 |

== Charts ==
=== Weekly charts ===
| Chart (2001) | Peak position |
|---|---|
| Scottish Albums (OCC) | 59 |
| UK Albums (OCC) | 6 |

=== Year-end charts ===
| Chart (2001) | Position |
|---|---|
| UK Albums (OCC) | 63 |
| Chart (2002) | Position |
| UK Albums (OCC) | 154 |

== Certifications ==
| Region | Certification | Certified units/sales |
|---|---|---|
| United Kingdom (BPI) | Platinum | 300,000^{^} |
^{^} Shipments figures based on certification alone.
