= Lists of American drama television episodes =

This is a list of lists of American drama television episodes.

== 0–9 ==
- List of 9-1-1 episodes
- List of 9-1-1: Lone Star episodes
- List of The 100 episodes

== A ==
- List of The Affair episodes
- List of The Agency episodes
- List of Agents of S.H.I.E.L.D. episodes
- List of All American episodes
- List of The Americans episodes
- List of Army Wives episodes

== B ==
- List of Baa Baa Black Sheep episodes
- List of Bajo el mismo cielo episodes
- List of Bates Motel episodes
- List of Ben Casey episodes
- List of Big Love episodes
- List of Billions episodes
- List of Black Sails episodes
- List of Bloodline episodes
- List of The Bold Ones episodes
- List of The Bold Ones: The New Doctors episodes
- List of Boston Public episodes
- List of Brothers & Sisters episodes
- List of Bull (2016 TV series) episodes

== C ==
- List of Carnivàle episodes
- List of Cedar Cove episodes
- List of Charmed (2018 TV series) episodes
- List of Chasing Life episodes
- List of Chesapeake Shores episodes
- List of Cheyenne episodes
- List of Chicago Fire episodes
- List of Chicago Hope episodes
- List of Chicago Med episodes
- List of China Beach episodes
- List of The Chosen episodes
- List of Code Black episodes
- List of The Colbys episodes
- List of Combat! episodes
- List of The Commish episodes
- List of Creepshow (TV series) episodes
- List of The Crown episodes
- List of CSI: Cyber episodes

== D ==
- List of Daktari episodes
- List of Dallas (2012 TV series) episodes
- List of Dallas (1978 TV series) episodes
- List of Deadwood episodes
- List of The Defenders (1961) episodes
- List of The Deputy episodes
- List of Designated Survivor episodes
- List of Desire episodes
- List of The Deuce episodes
- List of The District episodes
- List of Dr. Kildare episodes
- List of La Doña episodes
- List of Dr. Quinn, Medicine Woman episodes
- List of Dragnet (2003 TV series) episodes
- List of El Dragón: Return of a Warrior episodes
- List of Dynasty (1981 TV series) episodes
- List of Dynasty (2017 TV series) episodes

== E ==
- List of Emergency! episodes
- List of Empire episodes
- List of The Equalizer (2021 TV series) episodes
- List of ER episodes

== F ==
- List of Falcon Crest episodes
- List of Fame (1982 TV series) episodes
- List of Family episodes
- List of FBI episodes
- List of FBI: International episodes
- List of FBI: Most Wanted episodes
- List of Fear the Walking Dead episodes
- List of La Femme Nikita episodes
- List of Fireside Theatre episodes
- List of Flipper (1995 TV series) episodes
- List of Friday the 13th: The Series episodes
- List of Fringe episodes

== G ==
- List of Game of Thrones episodes
- List of Good Behavior episodes
- List of The Good Doctor episodes
- List of The Good Fight episodes
- List of The Good Wife episodes
- List of Greenleaf episodes
- List of Grey's Anatomy episodes
- List of The Guardian episodes

== H ==
- List of Hallmark Hall of Fame episodes
- List of Halt and Catch Fire episodes
- List of The Handmaid's Tale episodes
- List of Hannibal episodes
- List of The Haves and the Have Nots episodes
- List of Hawthorne episodes
- List of Highway to Heaven episodes
- List of Hit the Floor episodes
- List of Hollywood Heights episodes
- List of Homeland episodes
- List of House episodes
- List of House of Cards episodes
- List of How the West Was Won episodes
- List of How to Get Away with Murder episodes
- List of Humans episodes
- List of Hung episodes

== I ==
- List of I Am Frankie episodes
- List of If Loving You Is Wrong episodes
- List of In Plain Sight episodes
- List of In Treatment episodes

== J ==
- List of JAG episodes
- List of Jericho episodes

== K ==
- List of Kingdom (American TV series) episodes
- List of The Knick episodes
- List of Knots Landing episodes

== L ==
- List of The L Word episodes
- List of L.A. Law episodes
- List of Lassie (1954 TV series) episodes
- List of The Last Kingdom episodes
- List of The Last Ship episodes
- List of The Leftovers episodes
- List of Fire Country Episodes
- List of Little House on the Prairie episodes
- List of Lost episodes
- List of Lou Grant episodes
- List of The Love Boat episodes

== M ==
- List of Mad Men episodes
- List of Madam Secretary episodes
- List of Manifest episodes
- List of Marcus Welby, M.D. episodes
- List of Masterpiece Classic episodes
- List of Masterpiece Contemporary episodes
- List of Masterpiece Mystery! episodes
- List of Masterpiece Theatre episodes
- List of Masters of Sex episodes
- List of Medic episodes
- List of Medical Center episodes
- List of Melrose Place episodes
- List of Mickey Spillane's Mike Hammer (1984 TV series) episodes
- List of Midnight Caller episodes
- List of A Million Little Things episodes
- List of Mr. Robot episodes
- List of Mistresses (American TV series) episodes
- List of Mystery! episodes

== N ==
- List of The Name of the Game episodes
- List of Nancy Drew (2019 TV series) episodes
- List of Nashville episodes
- List of Necessary Roughness episodes
- List of New Amsterdam episodes
- List of The Night Shift episodes

== O ==
- List of Once Upon a Time episodes
- List of Outlander episodes
- List of Owen Marshall, Counselor at Law episodes
- List of Oz episodes

== P ==
- List of The Paper Chase episodes
- List of Penny Dreadful episodes
- List of La Piloto episodes
- List of The Practice episodes
- List of Preacher episodes
- List of Preso No. 1 episodes
- List of Private Practice episodes
- List of Promised Land episodes
- List of Providence episodes
- List of Pulitzer Prize Playhouse episodes

== Q ==
- List of ¿Quién es quién? episodes

== R ==
- List of Ray Bradbury Theater episodes
- List of Rectify episodes
- List of Reign episodes
- List of Remington Steele episodes
- List of The Resident episodes
- List of Revenge episodes
- List of Rizzoli & Isles episodes
- List of Rome (TV series) episodes
- List of Route 66 episodes
- List of The Royals episodes

== S ==
- List of Scandal episodes
- List of Scorpion episodes
- List of SEAL Team episodes
- List of Señora Acero episodes
- List of Señorita Pólvora episodes
- List of Sin senos sí hay paraíso episodes
- List of Six Feet Under episodes
- List of Sons of Anarchy episodes
- List of Soul Food episodes
- List of Spartacus (TV series) episodes
- List of St. Elsewhere episodes
- List of Star episodes
- List of Star Trek: New Voyages episodes
- List of Station 19 episodes
- List of The Strain episodes
- List of Strong Medicine episodes
- List of Sue Thomas: F.B.Eye episodes
- List of Suits episodes
- List of Supergirl episodes
- List of Supernatural episodes

== T ==
- List of Teen Wolf episodes
- List of Thirtysomething episodes
- List of This Is Us episodes
- List of Touched by an Angel episodes
- List of Trapper John, M.D. episodes
- List of Treme episodes
- List of The Tudors episodes
- List of Turn: Washington's Spies episodes
- List of Tyrant episodes

== W ==
- List of The Walking Dead episodes
- List of The Waltons episodes
- List of The West Wing episodes
- List of Westworld episodes
- List of When Calls the Heart episodes
- List of The White Shadow episodes
- List of Wynonna Earp episodes

== Y ==
- List of Yellowstone episodes
- List of The Young Indiana Jones Chronicles episodes

== Z ==
- List of Zoo episodes
- List of Zorro (1990 TV series) episodes
