= List of Masterpiece Theatre episodes =

This is the list of Masterpiece Theatre episodes in alphabetical order by year/season. The list includes episodes filmed as part of The American Collection.

== Episodes ==
This lists the titles of the individual miniseries. Although they occasionally only ran for one episode, many ran for as many as ten or more installments. Some have been rebroadcast in later seasons, but the following lists them according to original season, and then in alphabetical order.

In early 2008, Masterpiece Theatre and its affiliated program Mystery! were reformatted as Masterpiece. Masterpiece is aired as three different series. Masterpiece Classic airs in the winter and early spring, Masterpiece Mystery! in the late spring and summer, and Masterpiece Contemporary in the fall.

For lists of episodes of these series, see List of Masterpiece Classic episodes, List of Masterpiece Mystery! episodes, and List of Masterpiece Contemporary episodes.

=== First broadcast ===
- The Forsyte Saga (1967 series)

=== Season 1 (1971–72) ===
Alistair Cooke's first season as host.

- Cold Comfort Farm
- Elizabeth R
- The First Churchills
- The Gambler
- Jude the Obscure
- The Last of the Mohicans
- Père Goriot
- The Possessed
- Resurrection
- The Six Wives of Henry VIII
- The Spoils of Poynton

=== Season 2 (1972–73) ===
- Cousin Bette
- The Golden Bowl
- The Moonstone
- Point Counter Point
- Tom Brown's School Days
- Vanity Fair

=== Season 3 (1973–74) ===
- Clouds of Witness (Lord Peter Wimsey mystery)
- The Edwardians
- The Little Farm (Story by H. E. Bates, part of Country Matters series)
- The Man Who Was Hunting Himself
- The Unpleasantness at the Bellona Club (Lord Peter Wimsey mystery)
- Upstairs, Downstairs I-II (not all were shown)

=== Season 4 (1974–75) ===
- Country Matters I (Stories by H. E. Bates and A. E. Coppard)
- Murder Must Advertise (Lord Peter Wimsey mystery)
- The Nine Tailors (Lord Peter Wimsey mystery)
- Upstairs, Downstairs III
- Vienna 1900 (Stories by Arthur Schnitzler)

=== Season 5 (1975–76) ===
- Cakes and Ale
- Notorious Woman
- Shoulder to Shoulder
- Sunset Song
- Upstairs, Downstairs IV

=== Season 6 (1976–77) ===
- Five Red Herrings (Lord Peter Wimsey mystery)
- How Green Was My Valley
- Madame Bovary
- Poldark I
- Upstairs, Downstairs V

=== Season 7 (1977–78) ===
- Anna Karenina
- Dickens of London
- I, Claudius
- Our Mutual Friend
- Poldark II

=== Season 8 (1978–79) ===
- Country Matters II (Stories by H. E. Bates and A. E. Coppard)
- The Duchess of Duke Street I
- Lillie
- The Mayor of Casterbridge

=== Season 9 (1979–1980) ===
- Disraeli: Portrait of a Romantic
- The Duchess of Duke Street II
- Kean (play)
- Love for Lydia
- My Son, My Son (From a novel by Howard Spring)

=== Season 10 (1980–81) ===
In 1980, the show celebrated its 10th anniversary, and mysteries were moved to a separate program Mystery!.

- Crime and Punishment
- Danger UXB
- Pride and Prejudice
- 10th Anniversary Favorites
- Testament of Youth
- Thérèse Raquin

=== Season 11 (1981–82) ===
- Edward & Mrs. Simpson
- The Flame Trees of Thika
- Flickers
- I Remember Nelson
- Love in a Cold Climate
- A Town Like Alice (Australian, not British)

=== Season 12 (1982–83) ===
- Drake's Venture
- The Good Soldier
- On Approval (play)
- Private Schulz
- Sons and Lovers
- To Serve Them All My Days
- Winston Churchill: The Wilderness Years

=== Season 13 (1983–84) ===
- The Citadel
- The Irish R.M. I
- Nancy Astor
- Pictures
- The Tale of Beatrix Potter

=== Season 14 (1984–85) ===
- All for Love
  - A Dedicated Man by Elizabeth Taylor
  - Mona by Francis King
  - L'Elegance by Rumer Godden
  - A Bit Of Singing and Dancing by Susan Hill
- The Barchester Chronicles
- The Jewel in the Crown
- Strangers and Brothers

=== Season 15 (1985–86) ===
- Bleak House
- By the Sword Divided I
- The Irish R.M. II
- The Last Place on Earth
- Lord Mountbatten: The Last Viceroy

=== Season 16 (1986–87) ===
- The Death of the Heart
- Goodbye, Mr. Chips
- Lost Empires
- Love Song (From story Old Love)
- Paradise Postponed
- Silas Marner
- Star Quality: Noël Coward Stories
  - Star Quality
  - Mr. and Mrs. Edgehill
  - Me and the Girls
  - Mrs. Capper's Birthday
  - Bon Voyage

=== Season 17 (1987–88) ===
- The Bretts I
- By the Sword Divided II
- David Copperfield
- Day After the Fair
- Fortunes of War
- Northanger Abbey
- Sorrell & Son

=== Season 18 (1988–89) ===
- All Passion Spent
- The Bretts II
- The Charmer
- Christabel
- Heaven on Earth
- A Perfect Spy
- Talking Heads: Bed Among the Lentils
- A Very British Coup
- A Wreath of Roses

=== Season 19 (1989–1990) ===
- After the War
- And a Nightingale Sang
- The Dressmaker
- Glory Enough for All
- Piece of Cake
- Precious Bane
- The Real Charlotte
- A Tale of Two Cities
- Traffik
- The Yellow Wallpaper

=== Season 20 (1990–91) ===
- Backstage at Masterpiece Theatre
- The Ginger Tree
- The Heat of the Day
- House of Cards
- Jeeves & Wooster I
- A Room of One's Own
- Scoop
- The Shiralee
- Summer's Lease
- 20th Anniversary Favorites

=== Season 21 (1991–92) ===
Alistair Cooke's final season as host.

- Adam Bede (episode 3.10 of Screen One)
- Clarissa
- A Doll's House
- Henry V
- A Murder of Quality
- Parnell and the Englishwoman
- A Perfect Hero
- Portrait of a Marriage
- She's Been Away
- Sleepers
- Titmuss Regained

=== Season 22 (1992–93) ===
Russell Baker's first season as host.

- Best of Friends, The
- The Black Velvet Gown
- The Blackheath Poisonings
- Calling the Shots
- The Countess Alice
- Doctor Finlay I
- Hedda Gabler
- Impromptu
- Jeeves & Wooster II
- Memento Mori
- A Question of Attribution
- The Secret Agent
- Two Monologues: In My Defense, A Chip in the Sugar

=== Season 23 (1993–94) ===
- The Best Intentions
- Body & Soul
- A Foreign Field
- Jeeves & Wooster III
- Middlemarch
- Selected Exits
- Sharpe – Eagle
- Sharpe – Rifles
- To Play the King (House Of Cards UK)
- Where Angels Fear to Tread

=== Season 24 (1994–95) ===
- The Blue Boy
- The Cinder Path
- Dandelion Dead
- Doctor Finlay II
- Hard Times
- Jeeves & Wooster IV
- Martin Chuzzlewit
- The Rector's Wife
- Sharpe II – Company
- Sharpe II – Enemy
- Sharpe II – Honour

=== Season 25 (1995–96) ===
- Bramwell, Series I
- The Buccaneers
- Choir, The
- The Final Cut (House of Cards UK)
- The Great Kandinsky
- Heavy Weather
- Interview Day
- The Peacock Spring
- The Politician's Wife
- Prime Suspect 4
  - The Lost Child
  - Inner Circles
  - Scent of Darkness
- Signs and Wonders

=== Season 26 (1996–97) ===
Starting with this season, the show was renamed Mobil Masterpiece Theatre.

- Bramwell, Series II
- Breaking the Code
- Broken Glass
- Moll Flanders
- Nostromo
- Persuasion
- Prime Suspect 5: Errors of Judgement
- Rebecca
- A Royal Scandal

=== Season 27 (1997–98) ===
- Bramwell, Series III
- Far from the Madding Crowd
- The Mill on the Floss
- The Moonstone
- Painted Lady
- Reckless
- Rhodes
- The Tenant of Wildfell Hall
- The Wingless Bird
- The Woman in White

=== Season 28 (1998–99) ===
- Bramwell, Series IV
- Cider with Rosie
- Frenchman's Creek
- Goodnight Mr. Tom
- Great Expectations
- King Lear
- Much Ado About Nothing
- Our Mutual Friend
- The Prince of Hearts
- Reckless: The Sequel
- A Respectable Trade
- The Unknown Soldier
- Wuthering Heights

=== Season 29 (1999–2000) ===
Starting with this season, the show was renamed ExxonMobil Masterpiece Theatre, and ExxonMobil took over sponsorship.

- All the King's Men
- Aristocrats
- Bramwell, Series V
- David Copperfield
- Lost for Words
- Madame Bovary (February 6, 2000 & 13)
- Monsignor Renard
- A Rather English Marriage (October 3, 1999)
- Seeing Red
- Shooting the Past (November 21-December 5, 1999)
- The Turn of the Screw

=== Season 30 (2000–01) ===
Starting with this season, the show celebrated its 30th anniversary, and produced a spinoff called The American Collection.

- The American
- Anna Karenina
- Bramwell, Series VI
- Cora Unashamed
- Her Majesty, Mrs. Brown
- Oliver Twist
- The Railway Children
- The Song of the Lark
- Stiff Upper Lips
- Take a Girl Like You
- Talking Heads 2: Miss Fozzard Finds Her Feet
- Wives and Daughters

=== Season 31 (2001–02) ===
- Bertie & Elizabeth
- The Cazalets
- A Death in the Family
- Innocents
- Love in a Cold Climate
- Lucky Jim
- The Merchant of Venice
- The Murder of Stephen Lawrence
- My Uncle Silas
- Othello
- The Ponder Heart
- The Road from Coorain
- The Way We Live Now

=== Season 32 (2002–03) ===
- Almost a Woman
- Daniel Deronda
- The Forsyte Saga
- Foyle's War
- The Hound of the Baskervilles
- The Jury
- Me & Mrs. Jones
- My Uncle Silas II
- White Teeth

=== Season 33 (2003–04) ===
Russell Baker's final season as host.

- Doctor Zhivago
- The Forsyte Saga, Series II
- Goodbye, Mr. Chips
- Our Town
- Prime Suspect 6: The Last Witness
- Warrior Queen

=== Season 34 (2004–05) ===
Starting with this season, the show's titling reverted to Masterpiece Theatre, and the show began airing without a host.

- He Knew He Was Right
- Henry VIII
- Island at War
- The Lost Prince
- Pollyanna
- Talking Heads: The Hand of God

=== Season 35 (2005–06) ===
- Bleak House
- Carrie's War
- Kidnapped
- My Family and Other Animals
- Sherlock Holmes and the Case of the Silk Stocking
- Under the Greenwood Tree
- The Virgin Queen

=== Season 36 (2006–07) ===
- The Best of Masterpiece Theatre
- Casanova
- Dracula (February 11)
- Jane Eyre (January 21 and 28)
- Prime Suspect 7 – The Final Act
- The Sally Lockhart Mysteries: The Ruby in the Smoke
- Sharpe III – Gold
- Sharpe III – Battle
- Sharpe III – Sword
- Sharpe III – Regiment
- Sharpe III – Siege
- Sharpe III – Mission
- Sharpe III – Revenge
- Sharpe III – Justice
- Sharpe III – Waterloo
- The Secret Life of Mrs Beeton
- To the Ends of the Earth
- The Wind in the Willows

=== Season 37 (2007-08) (final season) ===
- The Amazing Mrs Pritchard

== See also ==
- List of Masterpiece Classic episodes
- List of Masterpiece Mystery! episodes
- List of Masterpiece Contemporary episodes
- Mystery!
- List of Mystery! episodes
- Great Performances
