= Miss Dynamite (TV series) =

Television series

- Spanish: Señorita Pólvora
- Genre: Telenovela
- Written by: Ana María Londoño; Rafael Noguera; Carolina Barrera; Juan Granados
- Directed by: Chava Cartas; Mauricio Cruz
- Starring: Camila Sodi; Iván Sánchez; José María de Tavira
- Opening theme: "Me encanta" by Carla Morrison
- Countries of origin: Mexico; Colombia; United States
- Original language: Spanish
- No. of seasons: 1
- No. of episodes: 70 (list of episodes)

Production
- Executive producer: Daniel Ucros
- Running time: 42-45 minutes
- Production company: Sony Pictures Television

Original release
- Network: TNT Latin America
- Release: March 16 – June 18, 2015

Miss Dynamite (Spanish: Señorita Pólvora), is a television series produced by Teleset for Sony Pictures Television and Televisa, which will be broadcast in the Latin American by TNT. It is the story of a Beauty Queen, who gets involved in a hit, which led to the premature death of her father.

It stars Camila Sodi as Valentina, Iván Sánchez as Miguel and José María de Tavira as Vicente.

== Plot ==
Señorita Pólvora follows Valentina, a young, beautiful and wealthy woman who falls for a hit man and thus discovers that the love of her life, and her own family, belong to one of the most powerful of Mexico drug cartels. The chronicle of their explosive life and its gradual descent into the world of crime.

== Cast ==
=== Main ===
- Camila Sodi as Valentina Cárdenas
- Iván Sánchez as Miguel Galindo / M8
- José María de Tavira as Vicente Martínez
- Saúl Lisazo as Octavio Cárdenas
- Hugo Stiglitz as Isidoro Hernández
- José Sefami as Elías Vásquez
- Mauricio Isaac as Ramiro Aguilar
- Paulina Gaitán as Noemí Loaiza / Lady Beretta
- Mara Cuevas as Ivonne Marín
- Mario Zaragoza as Saúl Pedreros
- Alex Durán as Morgan
- Emilio Savinni as Salomón Flores
- Francisco "Pakey" Vázquez as Capitán Darío Montoya
- Anilú Pardo as Coronel Guadalupe Imperial
- Claudette Maillé as Alicia Cortés / La Pantera
- Rodrigo Murray as Rafael Ortíz
- Camila Selser as Zoé Suárez
- David Medel as Marcos Pineda
- Miguel Conde as Carlos "Carlitos" Mariscal
- Oka Giner as Emilia Marín
- Dino García as Jacinto Marín
- Eréndira Ibarra as Tatiana Hucke

=== Recurring ===
- Max Flores as Ricardo
- Rodrigo Virago as Germán Castillo

== Broadcast ==
The series premiered on March 16, 2015 on TNT Latin America.

== Soundtrack ==
Track	Song	Singer (s)
1	"Me encanta"	Carla Morrison
2	"Badlands"	Damon Baxter
3	"Strange Things"	He & She
