= Monsterpiece Theater =

- First title card
- Genre: Children's Educational Parody segment
- Created by: Jon Stone; Tony Geiss
- Developed by: Sesame Workshop
- Written by: Norman Stiles; Tony Geiss; David Korr; Sara Compton; Emily Perl Kingsley; Belinda Ward; Cathi Rosenberg-Turow; Luis Santeiro; Lou Berger; Mark Saltzman; Jon Stone
- Directed by: Jon Stone; Robert Myhrum; Emily Squires; Lisa Simon; Ted May
- Presented by: Cookie Monster as "Alistair Cookie"
- Starring: Cookie Monster as "Alistair Cookie" (Muppet performed by Frank Oz)
- Voices of: Frank Oz; Jerry Nelson; Richard Hunt; Dave Goelz; Louise Gold; Kevin Clash; Fran Brill; Martin P. Robinson; Camille Bonora; David Rudman; Joey Mazzarino; Kathryn Mullen; Jim Martin; Rick Lyon; Jim Henson
- Theme music composer: Sam Pottle
- Composers: Sam Pottle; Dave Conner; Joe Raposo; Dick Lieb; Robby Merkin
- Country of origin: United States
- Original language: English
- No. of episodes: 38

Production
- Executive producers: Jon Stone; Al Hyslop; Dulcy Singer; Michael Loman
- Producers: Dulcy Singer; Lisa Simon; David Freyss
- Running time: Varies
- Production company: Sesame Workshop

Original release
- Network: PBS
- Release: April 25, 1978 – May 5, 1999

Related
- Dinner Theater; Masterpiece (TV series)

Monsterpiece Theater (later called Monsterpiece Theatre) is a recurring segment on the popular children's television series Sesame Street, a parody of Masterpiece Theatre.

== Format ==
While using Muppet characters to act out educational principles, primarily Grover and other Muppet monsters, Monsterpiece Theater is also a parody of the similarly acclaimed PBS show Masterpiece Theatre, now known simply as Masterpiece. The theme song is also a modified version of Fanfare-Rondeau, the Masterpiece theme song, only with trumpets and a much more upbeat tempo.

Monsterpiece Theater is hosted by Alistair Cookie, a play on the journalist and television personality Alistair Cooke, portrayed by Cookie Monster. He wears a smoking jacket and holds a bubble pipe which he usually ends up eating. The segments are loosely based on classic literature, plays, films, and TV shows. Similar segments, titled Mysterious Theater and parodying fellow PBS anthology Mystery!, are hosted by "Vincent Twice Vincent Twice," a parody of Vincent Price.

== Alistair Cookie ==
Alistair Cookie is Cookie Monster's alter ego when hosting Monsterpiece Theater. Created as a spoof of the original Masterpiece Theatre host Alistair Cooke, Alistair Cookie is basically Cookie Monster in an English smoking jacket and ascot tie, although Cooke was neither a pipe smoker nor did he wear a smoking jacket on Masterpiece Theatre. Alistair Cookie introduced viewers to a spot of culture while relaxing in a well-stuffed armchair. Though seemingly more sedate and urbane, Alistair Cookie is still a Cookie Monster, devouring baked goods, props—and in the revamped opening in the 1990s, noisily consuming cookies over the theme, while offering judicious comments on the texture.

He used to appear smoking a pipe and then eating it at the end of each piece. In the late 1980s, the pipe was gone so as not to reinforce smoking as a positive attribute.

In a 2004 Chicago Public Radio interview, David Rudman (who performs Cookie Monster) referred to Cookie Monster's occasional use of more advanced phrases, such as "It a bit esoteric," as his Alistair Cookie side:

He throws out these words like, you know, "Me digress." It's his whole Alistair Cookie side... It's a whole 'nother side of Cookie, where he's just kinda, you know, laid back and intellectual, but he still has that "Me Alistair Cookie," and it's just such a funny contrast.

Alistair Cookie is generally a detached party who simply serves as a frame for the Monsterpiece Theater spoofs. Occasionally, however, the participants take their grievances directly to Alistair Cookie ("Twelve Angry Men", "One Flew Over the Cuckoo's Nest"), crash into his sanctum ("The 39 Stairs"), or otherwise disrupt his hosting duties. On rare occasions, Cookie Monster himself stars in the sketches, as in "Twin Beaks", invariably winning rave critical reviews from Alistair Cookie.

He was first introduced in 1978. Alistair Cooke retired from Masterpiece Theater in 1992, replaced by American host Russell Baker, but this had no effect on Alistair Cookie, as reported in The Washington Post from February 24, 1993: "A spokeswoman for Sesame Street yesterday reassured its fans—and their children—that despite the change at the top, Cookie Monster will continue to appear as Alistair Cookie, the host of 'Monsterpiece Theater'—big chair, fireplace and all... 'We love that character,' said Ellen Morgenstern...".

Cooke himself was wryly appreciative of the take-off, predicting at a 1991 dinner celebrating the 20th anniversary of Masterpiece Theater that if he was remembered at all, he would be best recalled by fans of Sesame Street as "Alistair Cookie, the Cookie Monster of Monsterpiece Theater".

In 1998, Applause Toys offered a limited edition stuffed Alistair Cookie to collectors, complete with smoking jacket, slippers, and armchair. The item is still available through certain PBS stations.

== Sketch listings ==
Sketches on			Release date
Sketch	Description	Inspired By:	Release Date
"ABCD Blue"	Grover and Herry Monster portray police officers who sing the alphabet together for some neighborhood kids.	NYPD Blue	May 6, 1996
"Ali Baba and the Forty Thieves"	The forty thieves want to be introduced alongside Ali Baba before the story begins, but Alistair Cookie is out of time after he finishes counting them.	The story from the book of One Thousand and One Nights	January 19, 1988
"Anyone's Nose"	A monster sings a song about various noses and what they do.	The Cole Porter musical Anything Goes	December 20, 1994
"Chariots of Fur"	Grover and Herry Monster have a race.	Chariots of Fire	November 21, 1983
"Conservations with My Father"	Cookie Monster's loving dad, an environmentalist, teaches his son about conserving electricity and water.	Herb Gardner play Conversations with My Father	April 18, 1994
"Cyranose DeBergerac"	A poet with a 2-foot-long (0.61 m) nose tries to help the Queen of France finish her poem. Unfortunately, the word used to finish it is the word he's the most sensitive to: "nose." One mention of that word infuriates DeBergerac.	Cyrano de Bergerac	May 1, 1992
"Dances with Wolves"	A pig is initially reluctant to dance with a wolf, but she finds out that it's okay for two different people to dance together.	Dances with Wolves	April 7, 1994
"Dr. No"	Super-spy James Bond has trouble seeing and visits his optometrist, Doctor No, who recommends that James take off his dark glasses. Afterwards, Bond is able to see again.	Dr. No by Ian Fleming	April 20, 1994
"Fiddler on the Roof"	A farmer and his daughters sing about "Addition", which involves putting one fiddler on the roof after another.	Stein/Bock/Harnick musical Fiddler on the Roof	April 8, 1996
"Gone with the Wind"	Kermit the Frog and his "wife" in their home are caught in hurricane-force winds. While they hold on to the banister for support, Kermit tries to think of ideas to get out of the wind. His wife suggests subtracting; Kermit follows and is blown away, then his wife says "one of us, take away one of us is (wife gets blown away) ZEROOO!!!!!!", and finally Alistair Cookie experiences the wind.	Gone with the Wind by Margaret Mitchell.	January 6, 1988
"Guys and Dolls"	Herry Monster sings about how he likes to play with dolls, and Ruby sings about how she likes to play with trucks.	Frank Loesser musical Guys and Dolls	March 14, 1989
"Hamlet"	Mel Gibson plays Hamlet, who keeps repeating "words, words, words", but Elmo only looks at "pictures, pictures, pictures" because he can't read.	Hamlet by William Shakespeare	January 5, 1993
"Howard's End"	A yellow and pink rattlesnake named Howard slithers on a stone wall while he shows his beginning, middle, and end.	Howards End by E.M. Forster	May 18, 1994
"Inside/Outside Story"	Maria is inside and Tony is outside, so they sing about how they can get together.	West Side Story	April 5, 1993
"The King and I"	Grover plays a king, who dances with the lower-case letter "I".	Rodgers and Hammerstein musical The King and I	April 17, 1990
"Little House on Prairie"	Alistar Cookie displays an embarrassed Prairie Dawn with a little house on her head. Then, he shows "Little House Under Prairie", and is about to show "Little House in Prairie" before she runs into the studio, saying she can't do that. He proves her wrong by eating the little house.	Little House on the Prairie	March 1, 1994
"Lethal Weapon 3"	Mel Gibson and Danny Glover meet near a "Danger" sign, and take cover from a number "3", which falls from the sky.	Lethal Weapon 3.	November 17, 1992
"Me, Claudius"	Several monsters fight over which one of them is Claudius.	I, Claudius (with a title originating in the catchphrase I'm Spartacus!)	November 26, 1980
"Monster in a Box"	A small monster is supposed to be in a box, but instead he is on a box, and then under a box.	Spalding Gray monologue	April 13, 1993
"Monsters of Venice"	Grover convinces people that they should invite him and his monster friends to a party.	The Merchant of Venice by William Shakespeare	March 18, 1991
"Monsters with Dirty Faces"	Police Grover's first task of the day is to get a group of monsters to wash their faces, but they only do what their tough leader, Rocky, does.	Angels with Dirty Faces	May 6, 1993
"Much Ado About Nothing"	Waiter Grover laments to Mr. Johnson that the restaurant doesn't have anything he orders. Waiter Grover has 0 of the ingredients in the kitchen.	Much Ado About Nothing by William Shakespeare	April 20, 1992
"The Old Man and the C"	Grover plays an old man in a rowboat, which is on a giant letter "C".	The Old Man and the Sea by Ernest Hemingway	March 23, 1990
"One Flew Over the Cuckoo's Nest"	The wrong numbers keep flying over the wrong things.	One Flew Over the Cuckoo's Nest by Ken Kesey	February 1, 1990
"Room at the Top"	Grover climbs up a mountain to find there is no room at the top.	Room at the Top	May 7, 1993
"The Horse Whisperer"	Various animals whisper their own noise before a horse comes to whisper "neigh".	The Horse Whisperer	May 5, 1999
"The Postman Always Rings Twice"	Grover is waiting for the postman to deliver his important letter. However, as he waits, many other people come to his house with their own unique "rings".	The Postman Always Rings Twice	April 19, 1990
"The Sound of Music"	Grover sits on a hill which moves to the sound of music.	Rodgers and Hammerstein musical The Sound of Music	May 12, 1983
"The 400 Blows"	Grover has to blow out the candles on his birthday cake 400 times, causing him to gasp severely. In Part 1, he gets to 40 before fainting.	François Truffaut film Les Quatre Cents Coups.	February 9, 1990
"The Sun Also Rises"	Merry Monster and Grover are worried because their sick rooster won't crow. Merry successfully proves that the sun will rise if the rooster doesn't crow, but Merry crows because the animals are asleep.	The Sun Also Rises by Ernest Hemingway	April 19, 1991
"The Taming of the Shoe"	Grovero is accompanied by a talking shoe.	The Taming of the Shrew by William Shakespeare	April 11, 1989
"12 Angry Men"	After going through a situation similar to "One Flew Over the Cuckoo's Nest", Alistair Cookie announces he's out of time and is confronted by 12 Angry Men.	12 Angry Men	May 5, 1992
"39 Stairs"	Grover climbs 39 stairs to see what is at the top, but ends up being disappointed with the results.	Alfred Hitchcock film, The 39 Steps	April 28, 1987
"Twin Beaks"	Cookie Monster gets to star in this tale, in which he is a detective in a town where all birds have two beaks.	1990's television series Twin Peaks	February 26, 1991
"Upstairs, Downstairs"	Grover runs up and down a flight of stairs (look for a picture of Dr. Teeth on the wall).	British television series Upstairs, Downstairs	April 25, 1978
"Waiting for Elmo"	Grover and Telly Monster lament near a tree waiting for Elmo. In disgust, the tree both monsters are waiting near leaves to join the cast of Oklahoma!.	Waiting for Godot by Samuel Beckett	April 29, 1992

== American Monster Classics ==
Episode Title: A Streetcar Named Monster

- Time: 2:32
- Release Date: September 24, 2007
- Fun Fact: Cookie Monster introduces a spoof of A Streetcar Named Desire in which Grover has left his keys at the bowling alley. Because it's the crack of dawn, he must shout softly up to the window so that Stella may let him in.

== CD games ==
The Sesame Street CD-ROM games Elmo Through the Looking-Glass and The Three Grouchketeers feature Monsterpiece Theater introductions.

== See also ==
- Mouseterpiece Theater, a Disney Channel series hosted by George Plimpton
