= El Dragón: Return of a Warrior =

Spanish-language television series

- Genre: Drama
- Created by: Arturo Pérez-Reverte
- Written by: Esther Feldman; Daniela Richer; Carlos Algara; Marisel Lloberas; Sandra Finkelstain
- Directed by: Alvaro Curiel de Icaza; Mauricio Cruz Fortunato; Carlos Cock Marín; Pavel Vázquez
- Starring: Sebastián Rulli; Renata Notni; Roberto Mateos; Irina Baeva; Cassandra Sánchez Navarro; Manuel Balbi; Javier Gómez; Alejandro Ávila; Sofía Castro; Juan Pablo Gil; Alex Durán; Mauricio Pimentel; Edison Ruíz; Natasha Domínguez; Gabriela Carrillo; Rubén Sanz; Cynthia Klitbo; José Elías Moreno
- Theme music composer: Jaime Vargas Fabila
- Opening theme: "Guerrero" by Ilza Ponko
- Country of origin: United States
- Original language: Spanish
- No. of seasons: 2
- No. of episodes: 82 (list of episodes)

Production
- Executive producer: Carlos Bardasano
- Producer: Jorge Sastoque Roa
- Production locations: Tokyo, Japan; Madrid, Spain; Miami, United States; Mexico City, Mexico; Veracruz, Mexico; Huatulco, Mexico; Mazatlan, Mexico; Cuernavaca, Mexico
- Editor: Alba Merchán Hamann
- Camera setup: Multi-camera
- Production companies: Televisa; Univision; W Studios; Lemon Studios

Original release
- Network: Netflix (Worldwide); Univision (United States)
- Release: 30 September 2019 – 20 January 2020

El Dragón: Return of a Warrior (Spanish: El Dragón: El regreso de un guerrero), or simply El Dragón, is a Spanish-language crime drama television series created by Arturo Pérez-Reverte for Televisa and Univision. The series premiered first in the United States on 30 September 2019 on Univision, and its first season ended on 22 November 2019 with a total of 38 episodes. While the second season premiered on 25 November 2019 only in the United States, and concluded on 20 January 2020 with a total of 44 episodes. The first season was available for streaming outside the United States on Netflix on 4 October 2019. It stars Sebastián Rulli as the title character.

The first season of the series has positioned itself in the top 10 of the most watched programs on Netflix in Mexico.

== Premise ==
The series revolves around Miguel Garza (Sebastián Rulli), a man who because of his physical attractiveness and mysterious way of being attracts anyone who knows him. He believes that everyone revolves around him, and no one can oppose his charms. In addition to being attractive, he is intelligent and a successful entrepreneur in business. For Miguel everything seems to take him to the top of the world, but without knowing it, his worst enemy will be ambition.

== Plot ==
The story begins in Ciudad Jimenez, Mexico. There, Miguel's parents, Roberto and Lucía Garza, die as a result of an attempt against them; but he and his brother and sister survive. After this, the capo Lamberto Garza decides to protect his grandchildren and sends Miguel to study outside of Mexico and turn him into a successful businessman, while he sends Chisca (Cassandra Sánchez Navarro) to a boarding school in Spain and he keeps Jorge (Juan Pablo Gil) by his side at the ranch where he lives and from where he controls the largest drug transport in the region of Mexico.

20 years later, Miguel lives completely calm in Japan, with his girlfriend Asya, whom he loves deeply. And on top of that he is a successful financier. But suddenly he receives a call from Dora, the wife of his grandfather Lamberto, in which she tells him that he must travel to Mexico soon as it is a matter of life or death. Upon returning to Ciudad Jimenez, Mexico, Miguel realizes that his grandfather has Alzheimer's disease and that he is very weak in heart. Following this, Lamberto makes Miguel see that he must take care of the family business, and not only that, that he has 24 hours to decide whether or not to accept the position as head of the family cartel. Miguel without so many complaints, decides to accept the position as the new leader of the cartel of his family, but he does not pretend to be a drug dealer, on the contrary he accepts the position as a challenge, since he thinks that he can turn the family business into something else, such as for example in making money circulate around the world to make large legal financial investments.

Miguel ultimately accepts the position following the death of his wife, Aysa, who takes her own life after learning that she has a terminal illness Following her death, Miguel becomes emotionally withdrawn until he meets Adela (Renata Notni), a taxi driver, who is unimpressed by his wealth and status and challenges his view of himself. Despite his lack of experience in organised crime, Miguel draws on skills acquired during his time in Japan, including martial arts, traditional healing techniques and knowledge of several languages. He returns to Mexico intending to reunite with his siblings, but becomes involved in conflicts with several international criminal organisations. His journey takes him to Colombia, where he is kidnapped, and brings him into conflict with Russian and Italian criminal groups, American authorities and the Japanese yakuza.

== Cast ==
An extensive cast list was published in June 2019 by Peruvian outlet El Comercio.

=== Main ===
- Sebastián Rulli as Miguel Garza
- Renata Notni as Adela Cruz
- Roberto Mateos as Epigmenio Moncada
- Irina Baeva as Jimena Ortiz
- Cassandra Sánchez Navarro as Chisca Garza
- Manuel Balbi as Héctor Bernal
- Javier Gómez as Carlos Duarte
- Alejandro Ávila as inspector Toledo
- Sofía Castro as Kenia
- Juan Pablo Gil as Jorge Garza
- Alex Durán as Ishiro Tanaka
- Mauricio Pimentel as Peligros
- Edison Ruíz as Tacho
- Natasha Domínguez as Claudia
- Gabriela Carrillo as Edna gonzalez
- Rubén Sanz as Valentín Soria
- Cynthia Klitbo as Dora Garza
- José Elías Moreno as Lamberto Garza

=== Recurring ===
- Denia Agalianu as Karina Grishenko
- Fernando Gaviria as Sandro Ochoa
- Orlando Moguel as Detective CJ
- Alejandro Naranjo as Vladimir
- Rodrigo Massa as Piero Scarinci
- Sergio Recio Montes as Canelo
- Carmen Muga as Isabel
- Christian Uribe as Raúl
- Daniel Elbittar as Víctor
- Federico Ayos as El Flaco
- Alejandra Espinoza
- Víctor Jiménez
- Jose Carlos Illanes as David.

=== Guest stars ===
- Marcelo Buquet as Rosario
- Zuleyka Rivera as Asya
- Alejandra Robles Gil as Lucía Garza
- Gonzalo García Vivanco as Roberto Garza
- Paula Sandoval as Ximena Herrera
- José María Galeano as Leopoldo Santamarina

== Television broadcast ==
The entire first season was first released on streaming service Netflix on 4 October 2019; the series premiered on Univision on 30 September 2019.

Viewership and ratings per season of El Dragón: Return of a Warrior
Season	Timeslot (ET)	Episodes	First aired		Last aired		Avg. viewers (millions)	18–49 rank
Season	Timeslot (ET)	Episodes	Date	Viewers (millions)	Date	Viewers (millions)	Avg. viewers (millions)	18–49 rank
1	Mon–Fri 10pm	38	30 September 2019	1.43	22 November 2019	1.11	1.16	TBD
2	Mon–Fri 10pm	44	25 November 2019	1.39	20 January 2020	1.73	1.36	TBD

== Production ==
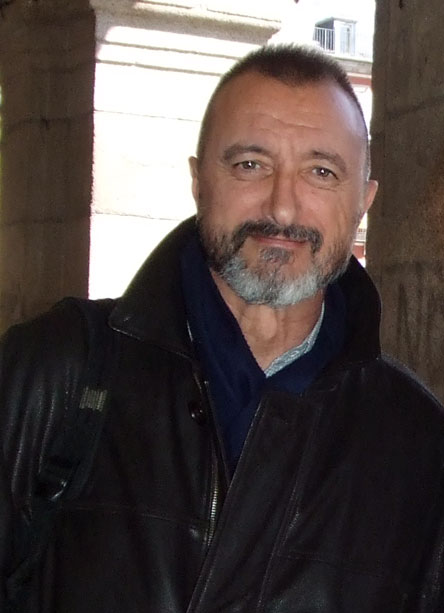
Arturo Pérez-Reverte creator of the series

The creation of the series began in the wake of a meeting in Madrid, Spain with Arturo Pérez-Reverte and Patricio Wills, who had previously created La Reina del Sur, a series that opened the way to the "world of narconovelas". The idea was to try to do something different from Teresa Mendoza. At that time, both already had a perspective of Miguel Garza. Wills, who was then looking to create a new and different story, told Pérez-Reverte and he said: "I suggested a story of a third generation of narcos. How the grandson of a narco would act when he was heir to an empire". At that time, both said that "Miguel was going to be a man trained in Japan, an industrialist, a financier, who has more computer scientists than gunmen, more economists than gunmen or border men. The series creation process, initially announced in 2016, also required several years of development and hundreds of auditions.

The series was confirmed on 10 May 2018 during the Univision upfront for the 2018–2019 television season. A year later was presented again at the upfront for the 2019–2020 television season. Filming of the series began on 13 November 2018 with the title El último dragón, and concluded on 25 July 2019, thus confirming a total of 82 episodes for the first season. The series is created by Spanish author Arturo Pérez-Reverte, produced by Carlos Bardasano and deloveped by W Studios and Lemon Films for Univision, and Televisa. The series was filmed for eight months in places like Tokyo, Japan, Madrid, Spain, Miami, United States and in Mexico, specifically in Mexico City; Up to three units were used simultaneously with Sony F55 cameras and Ultra Prime optics. Torture scenes of the main hero were filmed in the mountains of Colombia, and featured actor Juan Aguirre as Miguel Garza's torturer. Part of the story of El Dragón takes place in Japan, one of the countries with the greatest tradition in martial arts. To play Miguel Garza, Sebastián Rulli had a seven-month training at Aikido. And the actors Alex Durán and Víctor Jiménez required special preparation to adapt to the Yakuza culture. In addition to filming in Spain, Japan and the United States, the Mexican cities of Veracruz, Huatulco, Mazatlan and Cuernavaca served as locations for the series.

After passing through Japan to begin filming El Dragón, Sebastián Rulli traveled to Spain to film scenes of the series with Mexican actress Cassandra Sánchez Navarro, who is his sister in the series. Cassandra said "I've been filming with you for a few days, but I feel as if you are already my brother of a lifetime". Renata Notni began filming on Tuesday, 4 December 2018 in Mexico, while Rulli did the same a little earlier in Japan. Both actors filmed their first scenes together the first week of December in Mexico.

== Netflix acquisition ==
At the end of October 2018, it was confirmed that Netflix and Televisa would partner again to create new content. Among the productions highlighted in his proposal was El último dragón. Several months later, Irina Baeva shared through her Instagram account that the series would have its premiere via streaming on 4 October 2019 on Netflix, but with the title changed to El Dragón: El regreso de un guerrero. This would be the first series of Televisa, to premiere online, after its premiere on television. On Netflix the series consists of 38 episodes.
