= List of Masterpiece Contemporary episodes =

This is the list of Masterpiece Contemporary episodes in order by season.

== Episodes ==
In January 2008, Masterpiece Theatre and its affiliated program Mystery! were reformatted as Masterpiece. Masterpiece was then aired as three different series. Initially, Masterpiece Classic aired in the winter and early spring (hosted by Gillian Anderson), Masterpiece Mystery! in the late spring and summer, and Masterpiece Contemporary in the fall. In later seasons, particularly after an increase in funding for WGBH and Masterpiece, the scheduling became more random. Later, all three programs air at any time throughout the year, and on nearly half the Sundays, two episodes from two different miniseries will air on the same night.

This lists the titles of the individual miniseries. Some ran for only one episode, many ran for two or more installments. The following lists them according to the original season, and then in alphabetical order. The number of the season continues in the sequence set by the predecessor series, Masterpiece Theatre, which ended with Season 37. This is in spite of the fact that the other predecessor series, Mystery!, ended with Season 27. All episodes that air in one calendar year are considered to be in the same season.

For lists of episodes of the other two series, see List of Masterpiece Classic episodes, and List of Masterpiece Mystery! episodes. For older episodes of Masterpiece Theatre, see List of Masterpiece Theatre episodes.

This list does not include any rebroadcasts of series, including those previously shown on Masterpiece Theatre or Mystery!

=== Season 38 (2008) ===
- The Last Enemy (Oct 5, 12, 19, 26 and Nov 2)
- God on Trial (Nov 9)
- Filth: The Mary Whitehouse Story (Nov 16)
- The Unseen Alistair Cooke - A Masterpiece Special (Nov 23)

=== Season 39 (2009) ===
- Endgame (Oct 25)
- Place of Execution (Nov 1 and 8)
- Collision (Nov 15 and 22)

=== Season 40 (2010) ===
- Lennon Naked (Nov 21)
- Framed (Dec 26)

=== Season 41 (2011) ===
- Page Eight (Worricker Trilogy, Part One) (Nov 6)
- The Song of Lunch (Nov 13)

In September 2012, the Masterpiece website dropped the three distinctive "Classic", "Mystery", and "Contemporary" sub-labels and placed everything within the singular "Masterpiece" label.
