= Suite of Symphonies for brass, strings and timpani No. 1 =

Composition by Jean-Joseph Mouret

The Suite of Symphonies for brass, strings & timpani No. 1 (Suite De Symphonies, Première Suite de Symphonies) is a composition by Jean-Joseph Mouret. The first movement of this piece, the rondeau, is widely known and commonly used in weddings, and notably on the PBS program Masterpiece. Mouret composed this piece in 1729, while being the director for the Concert Spirituel, which was one of the first concert series known in existence.

== Structure ==
This piece is a four-movement work that consists of the Rondeau, which is a piece of music where the main theme or melody is repeated several times throughout; the second movement is the Gracieusement sans lenteur; the third movement is the Allegro; the final movement being the Guay.

== Background and premiere ==
The Symphony was written for Prince of Dombes, Louis Auguste de Bourbon, the grandson of King Louis XIV of France. Auguste had served under the military commander Prince Eugene of Savoy. Mouret dedicated this suite to his skill in battle, inspired by the Austro-Turkish War. Mouret first played this piece for King Louis XV in the Palace of Versailles.

== Fanfare-Rondeau legacy ==
This rondeau from the first Suite de Symphonies is well known as the theme from Masterpiece Theatre, and remains popular at weddings.

Henry Mancini recorded a pop arrangement of the "Fanfare-Rondeau" for The Mancini Generation in 1972. It was featured during a flashback scene in the 1973 Thai film Darunee phee sing. It was subsequently covered by Hot Butter on their 1974 album Moog Hits.

In 1991 rondeau was part of the soundtrack for the video game Civilization as the 'English theme'.

In 2008, the first four episodes of Boing Boing Video's SPAMasterpiece Theater opened with a chiptune remix of Jean-Joseph Mouret's "Rondeau: Fanfare" by Hamhocks Buttermilk Johnson as a parody of Masterpiece Theatre.

Between June and September 2020, the song was used as the opening to the "Word Play" vocabulary short films on Nickelodeon's NOGGIN SVOD channel/app.

Sam Pottle composed a piece of music which parodies the rondeau segment for the 1978 PBS program Monsterpiece Theater, a spin-off of Sesame Street.

== See also ==
- Rondo
