= List of Masterpiece Classic episodes =

This is the list of Masterpiece Classic episodes in order by season.

== Episodes ==
In January 2008, Masterpiece Theatre and its affiliated program Mystery! were reformatted as Masterpiece. Masterpiece was then aired as three different series. Initially, Masterpiece Classic aired in the winter and early spring (hosted by Gillian Anderson), Masterpiece Mystery! in the late spring and summer, and Masterpiece Contemporary in the fall. In later seasons, particularly after an increase in funding for WGBH and Masterpiece, the scheduling became more random. Currently, all three programs air at any time throughout the year, and on nearly half the Sundays, two episodes from two different miniseries will air on the same night.

This lists the titles of the individual miniseries. Some ran for only one episode, many ran for two or more installments. The following lists them according to original season, and then in alphabetical order. The number of the season continues in the sequence set by the predecessor series, Masterpiece Theatre, which ended with Season 37. This is in spite of the fact that the other predecessor series, Mystery!, ended with Season 27. All episodes that air in one calendar year are considered to be in the same season.

For lists of episodes of the other two series, see List of Masterpiece Mystery! episodes, and List of Masterpiece Contemporary episodes. For older episodes of Masterpiece Theatre, see List of Masterpiece Theatre episodes.

This list does not include any rebroadcasts of series, including those previously shown on Masterpiece Theatre or Mystery!

In September 2012, the Masterpiece website dropped the three distinctive "Classic", "Mystery", and "Contemporary" sub-labels and placed everything within the singular "Masterpiece" label.

As of the start of broadcasting Victoria Series One in January 2017, Masterpiece Classic was no longer branded as such, but simply Masterpiece (on screen, PBS Masterpiece online and social media), and it no longer had an on-screen host.

=== Season 38 (2008) ===
- The Complete Jane Austen
  - Persuasion (Jan 13)
  - Northanger Abbey (Jan 20)
  - Mansfield Park (Jan 27)
  - Miss Austen Regrets (Feb 3)
  - Pride and Prejudice (Feb 10, 17 and 24)
  - Emma (Mar 23)
  - Sense and Sensibility (Mar 30 and Apr 6)
- A Room With a View (Apr 13)
- My Boy Jack (Apr 20)
- Cranford (May 4, 11 and 18)

=== Season 39 (2009) ===
- Tess of the D'Urbervilles (Jan 4 and 11)
- Wuthering Heights (Jan 18 and 25)
- The Tales of Charles Dickens
  - Oliver Twist (Feb 15 and 22)
  - Little Dorrit (Mar 29; Apr 5, 12, 19, and 26)
  - The Old Curiosity Shop (May 3)

=== Season 40 (2010) ===
- Return to Cranford (Jan 10 and 17)
- Emma (Jan 24, 31; and Feb 7)
- The 39 Steps (Feb 28)
- Sharpe
  - Sharpe's Challenge (Mar 28)
  - Sharpe's Peril (Apr 4)
- The Diary of Anne Frank (Apr 11)
- Small Island (Apr 18 and 25)

=== Season 41 (2011) ===
- Downton Abbey, series I (Jan 9, 16, 23, and 30)
- Any Human Heart (Feb 13, 20, and 27)
- Upstairs, Downstairs, series I (Apr 10, 17, and 24)
- South Riding (May 1, 8, and 15)

=== Season 42 (2012) ===
- Downton Abbey, series II (Jan 8, 15, 22, 29; Feb 5, 12, 19)
- Great Expectations (Apr 1, 8)
- The Mystery of Edwin Drood (Apr 15)
- Birdsong (Apr 22, 29)
- Upstairs, Downstairs, series II (Oct 7, 14, 21, 28; Nov 4, 11)

In September 2012, the Masterpiece website dropped the three distinctive "Classic", "Mystery", and "Contemporary" sub-labels and placed everything within the singular "Masterpiece" label.

=== Season 43 (2013) ===
- Downton Abbey, series III (Jan 6, 13, 20, 27; Feb 3, 10, 17)
- Mr Selfridge, series I (Mar 31; Apr 7, 14, 21, 28; May 5, 12, 19)
- Inspector Lewis, Series VI (UK Series VII) (Jun 16, 23, 30)
- Endeavour, Series I (Jul 7, 14, 21, 28)
- The Lady Vanishes (Aug 18)
- Silk, Series I (Aug 25; Sep 1, 8)
- Foyle's War, Series VII (Sep 15, 22, 29)
- The Paradise, series I (Oct 6, 13, 20, 27; Nov 3, 10, 17)

=== Season 44 (2014) ===
- Downton Abbey, series IV (Jan 5, 12, 19, 26; Feb 2, 9, 16, 23)
- Sherlock, Series III (Jan 19, 26; Feb 2)
- Mr Selfridge, series II (Mar 30; Apr 6, 13, 20, 27; May 4, 11, 18)
- The Escape Artist (Jun 15; 22)
- Endeavour, Series II (Jun 29; Jul 6, 13, 20)
- Agatha Christie's Poirot, Series XII (UK Series XIII: 2-3) (Jul 27; Aug 3)
- Breathless (Aug 24, 31; Sep 7)
- Agatha Christie's Marple, Series VII (UK Series VI) (Sept 21, 28)
- Inspector Lewis, Series VII (UK Series VIII) (Oct 5, 12, 19)
- The Paradise, series II (Sept 28; Oct 5, 12, 19, 26; Nov 2, 9, 16)
- Death Comes to Pemberley (Oct 26; Nov 2)
- Turks & Caicos (Worricker Trilogy, Part Two) (Nov 9)
- Salting the Battlefield (Worricker Trilogy, Part Three) (Nov 16)

=== Season 45 (2015) ===
- The Manners of Downton Abbey – A Masterpiece Special (Jan 4)
- Downton Abbey, series V (Jan 4, 11, 18, 25; Feb 1, 8, 15, 22; Mar 1)
- Grantchester, Series I (Jan 18, 25; Feb 1, 8, 15, 22)
- Mr Selfridge, series III (Mar 29; Apr 5, 12, 19, 26; May 3, 10, 17)
- Wolf Hall (Apr 5, 12, 19, 26; May 3, 10)
- Poldark, series I (Jun 21, 28; Jul 5, 12, 19, 26; Aug 2)
- Arthur & George (Sep 6, 13, 20)
- Indian Summers, series I (Sep 27; Oct 4, 11, 18, 25; Nov 1, 8, 15, 22)
- Home Fires, series I (Oct 4, 11, 18, 25; Nov 1, 8)

=== Season 46 (2016) ===
- Sherlock: The Abominable Bride (Special Episode) (Jan 1)
- Downton Abbey, series VI (Jan 3, 10, 17, 24, 31; Feb 7, 14, 21; Mar 6)
- Grantchester, Series II (Mar 27, Apr 3, 10, 17, 24; May 1)
- Mr Selfridge, series IV (Mar 27; Apr 3, 10, 17, 24; May 1, 8, 15, 22)
- Wallander, The Final Season (UK Series IV) (May 8, 15, 22)
- Endeavour, Series III (June 19, 26; July 3, 10)
- Inspector Lewis, Series VIII (UK Series IX) (Aug 7, 14, 21)
- Churchill's Secret (Sept 11)
- Indian Summers, series II (Sept 11, 18, 25; Oct 2, 9, 16, 30; Nov 6, 13, 20)
- Poldark, series II (Sept 25; Oct 2, 16, 23, 30; Nov 6, 13, 20, 27)
- The Durrells in Corfu, series I (Oct 16, 23, 30; Nov 6, 13, 20)

=== Season 47 (2017) ===
- Sherlock, Series IV (Jan 1, 8, 15)
- Victoria, series I (Jan 15, 22, 29; Feb 5, 12, 19; Mar 5)
- To Walk Invisible: The Brontë Sisters (Mar 26)
- Home Fires, series II (Apr 2, 9, 16, 23, 30; May 7)
- King Charles III (May 14)
- Dark Angel (May 21)
- My Mother and Other Strangers (June 18, 25; Jul 2, 9, 16)
- Grantchester, Series III (Jun 18, 25; Jul 2, 9, 16, 23, 30)
- Prime Suspect: Tennison (Jun 25; Jul 2, 9)
- Endeavour, Series IV (Aug 20, 27; Sep 3, 10)
- Poldark, series III (Oct 1, 8, 15, 22, 29; Nov 5, 12, 19)
- The Collection (Oct 8, 15, 22, 29; Nov 5, 12, 19)
- The Durrells in Corfu, series II (Oct 15, 22, 29; Nov 5, 12, 19)

=== Season 48 (2018) ===
- Victoria, series II (Jan 14, 21, 28; Feb 4, 11, 18, 25)
- The Child in Time (Apr 1)
- Unforgotten, series II (Apr 29; May 6, 13)
- Little Women (May 13, 20)
- Man in an Orange Shirt (Jun 17)
- Endeavour, Series V (Jun 24; Jul 1, 8, 15, 22, 29)
- The Miniaturist (Sep 9, 16, 23)
- The Durrells in Corfu, series III (Sep 30; Oct 7, 14, 21, 28; Nov 4, 11, 18)
- Poldark, series IV (Sep 30; Oct 7, 14, 21, 28; Nov 4, 11, 18)

=== Season 49 (2019) ===
- Victoria, series III (Jan 13, 20, 27; Feb 3, 10, 17, 24; Mar 3)
- Mrs. Wilson (Mar 31; Apr 7)
- Unforgotten, series III (Apr 7, 14, 21, 28; May 5, 12)
- Les Misérables (Apr 14, 21, 28; May 5, 12, 19)
- Endeavour, Series VI (Jun 16, 23, 30; Jul 7)
- Grantchester, series IV (Jul 14, 21, 28; Aug 4, 11)
- The Durrells in Corfu, series IV (Sep 29; Oct 6, 13, 20, 27; Nov 3)
- Poldark, series V (Sep 29; Oct 6, 13, 20, 27; Nov 3, 10, 17)
- Press (Oct 6, 13, 20, 27; Nov 3, 10)
- The Chaperone (Nov 24)

=== Season 50 (2020) ===
- Howards End (Jan 12, 19, 26; Feb 2)
- Sanditon, series I (Jan 12, 19, 26; Feb 2, 16, 23)
- World on Fire, series I (Apr 5, 12, 19, 26; May 3, 10, 17)
- Baptiste, series I (Apr 12, 19, 26; May 3, 10, 17)
- Grantchester, series V (Jun 14, 21, 28; Jul 5, 12, 19)
- Beecham House (Jun 14, 21, 28; Jul 5, 12, 19)
- Endeavour, series VII (Aug 9, 16, 23)
- Van der Valk, series I (Sep 13, 20, 27)
- Flesh and Blood (Oct 4, 11, 18, 25)
- Roadkill (Nov 1, 8, 15, 22)

=== Season 51 (2021) ===
- Elizabeth Is Missing (Jan 3)
- All Creatures Great and Small, series I (Jan 10, 17, 24, 31; Feb 7, 14, 21)
- Miss Scarlet and The Duke, series I (Jan 17, 24, 31; Feb 7, 14, 21)
- The Long Song (Jan 31; Feb 7, 14)
- Atlantic Crossing (Apr 4, 11, 18, 25; May 2, 9, 16, 23)
- Us (June 20, 27)
- Unforgotten, series IV (Jul 11, 18, 25; Aug 1, 8, 15)
- Guilt, series II (Sep 5, 12)
- Grantchester, series VI (Oct 3, 10, 17, 24, 31; Nov 7, 14, 21)
- Baptiste, series II (Oct 17, 24, 31; Nov 7, 14, 21)

=== Season 52 (2022) ===
- Around the World in 80 Days (Jan 2, 9, 16, 23, 30; Feb 6, 13, 20)
- All Creatures Great and Small, series II (Jan 9, 16, 23, 30; Feb 6, 13, 20)
- Sanditon, series II (Mar 20, 27; Apr 3, 10, 17, 24)
- Ridley Road (May 1, 8, 15, 22)
- Endeavour, series VIII (Jun 19, 26; Jul 3)
- Grantchester, series VII (Jul 10, 17, 24, 31; Aug 7, 14)
- Guilt, series II (Aug 28; Sep 4, 11)
- Van der Valk, series II (Sep 25; Oct 2, 9)
- Miss Scarlet and The Duke, series II (Oct 16, 23, 30; Nov 6, 13, 20)
- Magpie Murders (Oct 16, 23, 30; Nov 6, 13, 20)
- Annika, series I (Oct 16, 23, 30; Nov 6, 13, 20)

=== Season 53 (2023) ===
- Miss Scarlet and The Duke, series III (Jan 8, 15, 22, 29; Feb 5, 12)
- All Creatures Great and Small, series III (Jan 8, 15, 22, 29; Feb 5, 12, 19)
- Sanditon, series III (Mar 19, 26; Apr 2, 9, 16, 23)
- Tom Jones (Apr 30; May 7, 14, 21)
- Endeavour, series IX (Jun 18, 25; Jul 2)
- Grantchester, series VIII (Jul 9, 16, 23, 30; Aug 6)
- Unforgotten, series V (Sep 3, 10, 17, 24; Oct 1, 8)
- Van der Valk, series III (Sep 3, 10, 17, 24; Oct 1, 8)
- World on Fire, series II (Oct 15, 22, 29; Nov 5, 12, 19)
- Annika, series II (Oct 15, 22, 29; Nov 5, 12, 19)

=== Season 54 (2024) ===
- Miss Scarlet and The Duke, series IV (Jan 7, 14, 21, 28; Feb 4, 11)
- All Creatures Great and Small, series IV (Jan 7, 14, 21, 28; Feb 4, 11, 18)
- Nolly (Mar 17, 24, 31)
- Alice & Jack (Mar 17, 24, 31; Apr 7, 14, 21)
- Mr Bates vs The Post Office (Apr 7, 14, 21, 28)
- Guilt, series III (Apr 28; May 5, 12, 19)
- MaryLand (May 5, 12, 19)
- Grantchester, series IX (Jun 16, 23, 30; Jul 7, 14, 21, 28; Aug 4)
- Moonflower Murders (Sep 15, 22, 29; Oct 6, 13, 20)
- Van der Valk series IV (Sep 15, 22, 29; Oct 6, 13, 20)
- The Marlow Murder Club, series I (Oct 27; Nov 3, 10, 17)

=== Season 55 (2025) ===
- Miss Scarlet and The Duke, series V (Jan 12, 19, 26; Feb 2, 9, 16)
- All Creatures Great and Small, series V (Jan 12, 19, 26; Feb 2, 9, 16, 23)
- Wolf Hall: The Mirror and the Light (Mar 23, 30; Apr 6, 13, 20, 27)
- Miss Austen (May 4, 11, 18)
- Grantchester, series X (Jun 15, 22, 29; Jul 6, 13, 20, 27; Aug 3)
- The Marlow Murder Club, series II (Aug 24, 31; Sep 7, 14, 21, 28)
- Unforgotten, series VI (Aug 24, 31; Sep 7, 14, 21, 28)
- Maigret, series I (Oct 5, 12, 19, 26; Nov 2, 9)
- The Gold, series I (Oct 5, 12, 19, 26; Nov 2, 9)
- The Great Escaper (Nov 23)

=== Season 56 (2026) ===
- Miss Scarlet and The Duke, series VI (Jan 11, 18, 25; Feb 1, 8, 15)
- All Creatures Great and Small, series VI (Jan 11, 18, 25; Feb 1, 8, 15, 22)
- The Forsytes, series I (Mar 22, 29; Apr 5, 12, 19, 26)
- The Count of Monte Cristo (Mar 22, 29; Apr 5, 12, 19, 26; May 3, 10)
- Grantchester, series X (Jun 14, 21, 28; Jul 5, 12, 19, 26; Aug 2)
- The Marlow Murder Club, series III (Sep 6, 13, 20, 27; Oct 4, 11)
- Marble Hall Murders (Sep 6, 13, 20, 27; Oct 4, 11)
- Maigret, series II (Oct 18, 25; Nov 1, 8, 15, 22)
- The Gold, series II (Oct 18, 25; Nov 1, 8, 15, 22)
