= Masterpiece (TV series) =

Drama anthology television series

- Also known as: Masterpiece Theatre (1971–2008); Masterpiece Contemporary; Masterpiece Mystery
- Genre: Anthology
- Presented by: Alistair Cooke (1971–1992); Russell Baker (1992–2004); Gillian Anderson (Masterpiece Classic, 2008); Alan Cumming (Masterpiece Mystery, 2008); Matthew Goode (Masterpiece Contemporary, 2008); Laura Linney (Masterpiece Classic, 2009); David Tennant (Masterpiece Contemporary, 2009)
- Theme music composer: Jean-Joseph Mouret
- Opening theme: Sinfonies de Fanfares: Rondeau
- Country of origin: United States
- Original language: English
- No. of seasons: 53

Production
- Production company: WGBH

Original release
- Network: PBS
- Release: January 10, 1971 – present

Related
- Great Performances

Masterpiece (formerly known as Masterpiece Theatre), is a drama anthology television series produced by WGBH Boston. It premiered on PBS on January 10, 1971. The series has presented numerous acclaimed British productions. Many of these are produced by the BBC, but the lineup has also included programs shown on fellow British networks ITV, Channel 4, and Channel 5.

== Overview ==
Masterpiece is known for presenting adaptations of novels and biographies, but it also shows original television dramas. The first title to air was The First Churchills, starring Susan Hampshire as Sarah Churchill. Other programs presented on the series include The Six Wives of Henry VIII; Elizabeth R; The Last of the Mohicans (TV series); I, Claudius; Upstairs, Downstairs; The Duchess of Duke Street; The Citadel; The Jewel in the Crown; Reckless; House of Cards; Traffik, The Moonstone, Strangers and Brothers and Jeeves and Wooster. More recent popular titles include Prime Suspect, The Forsyte Saga, Sherlock, Downton Abbey, Endeavour, Victoria and Guilt.

The theme music played during the opening credits is the Fanfare-Rondeau from Suite of Symphonies for brass, strings and timpani No. 1 by French composer Jean-Joseph Mouret. The theme was performed by Collegium Musicum de Paris with Roland Douatte as the conductor. It was recorded in 1954 by Vogue Records in Paris, France, and was later remastered in stereo and re-released by Nonesuch Records in the 1960s.

During the first seasons in the 1970s, the theme music accompanied varying closeup shots of a waving Union Jack, which panned out into a still image of the British flag on a staff serving as the P in "Masterpiece". In the late 1970s, the opening video switched to views of antique books and other literary artifacts, many of which titles had been dramatized on the program.

In 1980, Masterpiece gained a sister series, Mystery!, featuring a mix of contemporary and classic British detective and crime series, such as The Inspector Lynley Mysteries, Agatha Christie's Miss Marple, and Touching Evil. In 2000, to commemorate the 30th anniversary of the show, it presented Masterpiece: The American Collection, nine works by American writers, including Thornton Wilder's Our Town, starring Paul Newman.

== Awards and nominations ==
One of television's most honored series, the various shows aired on Masterpiece have won numerous Emmy and Peabody Awards.

In 2013, TV Guide ranked it #3 in its list of the 60 Greatest Dramas of All Time and #16 in its list of the 60 Greatest Shows of All Time.

== History ==
The success of the broadcast of the 1967 version of The Forsyte Saga on NET (the precursor of PBS) led Stanford Calderwood, then serving as president of WGBH, to investigate whether the BBC would sell programs to the station. Suggestions for the series format came from, among others, Frank Gillard in the UK and Christopher Sarson in the US. In looking for an underwriter for the series, Calderwood eventually met with Herb Schmertz of Mobil Corporation. Schmertz was able to gain funding for the show, and with Joan Wilson of WGBH-TV bought the American distribution rights for fifty hours of British dramas for about $1 million per year. He and several other men, including Frank Marshall, met in London and made a selection of programs to be broadcast.

Decisions on the format of the show were finalized and the series premiered on January 10, 1971, with the first episode of The First Churchills. The working title for the series had been The Best of the BBC, which was changed to Masterpiece Theatre before the first broadcast, with Sarson insisting upon the British spelling for Theatre. The series was hosted by British-American broadcaster and author / journalist Alistair Cooke (1908–2004), who initially had been reluctant to take the role. Cooke appeared for two decades until 1992; native Baltimorean, Pulitzer Prize-winning author and longtime columnist for The New York Times, Russell Baker (1925–2019), was next and hosted for over a decade from 1992 to 2004. From 2004 to 2008, it was broadcast without a host.

The original series producer was Sarson. He was succeeded in 1973 by Joan Wilson. The current series producer, Rebecca Eaton, took over in 1985 after Wilson's death from cancer. Mobil pulled out in 2004. In 2011 Eaton launched the Masterpiece Trust as a fundraising initiative, in collaboration with WGBH Boston. The Trust gives donors the opportunity to support their local PBS station and also "secure the future of superb British drama...invest upfront in the development of new scripts and programs, and grow the [Masterpiece] series both on-air and online". In the same year the series attracted new sponsors Viking River Cruises and Ralph Lauren (Ralph Lauren was subsequently replaced by Farmers Insurance). In the first three years the Trust raised $12 million from 45 donors.

The Masterpiece approach has been reported as being to put up about 10% of the production budget, in return for distribution rights and a degree of consultation on casting and content, but not editorial control. Masterpiece licences programs for several years, after which the broadcast rights revert to the original owners, generally the British producer or distributor. Interviewed in 2017, Eaton described her role at Masterpiece as "the person who chooses which British programs will be included in Masterpiece...looking at a lot of shows that are already made, reading scripts, and choosing the ones that would suit this audience."

They're made by British companies and British broadcasters – for the BBC and ITV – and once they're done, we bring them back here. It's also my job is to make sure the whole country knows about Masterpiece and knows about whatever show is being produced. There's a great deal of publicity and marketing to be done. I also have to raise money.

== Format change ==
Logo used immediately before the title change.

As reported by The New York Times, in December 2007, the series would be split into three, Classic, Mystery, and Contemporary (premiering at years open, in the summer, and in the fall of 2008, respectively), with the word "Theatre" being dropped, the franchise officially becoming known as Masterpiece.

Masterpiece Classic was initially hosted by Gillian Anderson; the following year, 2009, Laura Linney would take her place. Masterpiece Mystery!, which premiered in June 2008, was introduced with Alan Cumming as host. Finally, Masterpiece Contemporary would be hosted, later in 2008, by Matthew Goode, who would be replaced by David Tennant in May 2009.

All three versions received unique opening sequences and theme music, the latter with a common signature based upon the First Suite in D by Mouret. (Originally chosen by Sarson, he had heard it played at a Club Med resort in Sicily, choosing it because to him it had sounded "British and heraldic".)

In the opening to the "Classic" edition of shows, the word "Theatre" appears for a brief moment. (This has been suggested as a means to maintain WGBH's trademark registration on the former name.) The theme music of the show was composed by Man Made Music, Inc. The opening sequences of the show were designed by Kyle Cooper of Prologue.

In 2011, at the show's 40th anniversary, the opening of the show was altered to show "Classic" briefly before showing "40 years".

Then, as of 2017's broadcast of series one of Victoria, the program Masterpiece Classic no longer aired with a regular host, and the series was no longer branded as "Masterpiece Classic" but simply "Masterpiece".

== The Best of Masterpiece Theatre ==
In March 2007, to celebrate the 35th anniversary of the show, PBS aired an entertainment special produced and directed by Darcy Corcoran. The Best of Masterpiece was hosted by Sir Derek Jacobi and featured interviews with Dame Helen Mirren, Hugh Laurie, Damian Lewis, Robson Green, Ian Richardson, Gillian Anderson, Charles Dance, Alex Kingston, Anthony Andrews and Jean Marsh. The countdown special was based on more than 20,000 survey responses posted to the Masterpiece and PBS affiliate websites, the top 12 series were:

- Upstairs, Downstairs
- The Forsyte Saga (2002 adaptation)
- I, Claudius
- Bleak House (2005 adaptation)
- Prime Suspect parts 4–7
- The Jewel in the Crown
- Poldark (1970s version)
- House of Cards
- Reckless
- The Fortunes and Misfortunes of Moll Flanders
- Wives & Daughters (1999 adaptation)
- Jeeves and Wooster

At the end of the program, Anthony Andrews thanked the audience for voting the 1981 serial Brideshead Revisited as the seventh favorite series. He then pointed out that it had not aired as a part of Masterpiece Theatre. Rather, it had aired as a part of the PBS series entitled Great Performances.

== Parodies ==
- A series of film, theatre, and television show parodies appeared on Sesame Street as "Monsterpiece Theater", hosted by Cookie Monster as "Alistair Cookie". The theme music for "Monsterpiece Theater" (composed by Sam Pottle) was similar to the theme composed by Mouret.
- Disney Channel had a show titled Mousterpiece Theater hosted by George Plimpton, featuring Disney animated shorts.
- On In Living Color during Season 5 a sketch titled "Parody of Masterpiece" aired in which Jamie Foxx and David Alan Grier recited the lyrics of popular gangster rap songs of the early 1990s by artist such as Dr. Dre and Ice Cube. Cast member Marc Wilmore was the host imitating James Earl Jones.
- Fox's long running sketch comedy show Mad TV did a parody called "Master P's Theater", featuring a parody of the New Orleans rapper of the same name.
- In 2008, Boing Boing Video featured a web series called SPAMasterpiece Theater where humorist John Hodgman read unsolicited email spam in dramatizations in the parody of Masterpiece.
- In 2026, Rupaul's Drag Race season 18 Episode 3 featured a segment called "Masterqueef Theatre" featuring Lipstick Lovers as part of the larger RDR Live! sketch which is a parody of Saturday Night Live.

== See also ==
- List of Masterpiece Theatre episodes
- List of Masterpiece Classic episodes
- List of Masterpiece Mystery! episodes
- List of Masterpiece Contemporary episodes
- Mobil Showcase Network
