= List of ¿Quién es quién? episodes =

¿Quién es quién?, is an American telenovela produced by Gemma Lombardi, Joshua Mintz and Carmen Cecilia Urbaneja for Telemundo. It is an adaptation of the telenovela produced in 2003, Amor descarado.

== Episodes ==
No.	Title	Original release date
1	"Leonardo conoce a Perico"	October 26, 2015
2	"Perico rechaza casarse con Fernanda"	October 27, 2015
3	"Leonardo y Paloma se besan"	October 28, 2015
4	"Fernanda vengará a su familia"	October 29, 2015
5	"Jonathan le propone matrimonio a Inés"	October 30, 2015
6	"Leonardo pospone su boda con Cocó"	November 2, 2015
7	"Paloma huye de su casa"	November 3, 2015
8	"Leonardo salva la vida de Cachito"	November 4, 2015
9	"El nuevo trabajo de Yesenia"	November 5, 2015
10	"Basilio está por descubrir a Perico"	November 6, 2015
11	"Basilio descubre toda la verdad"	November 9, 2015
12	"Humberto descubre la infidelidad de Fabiola"	November 10, 2015
13	"Basilio se convierte en cómplice de Perico"	November 11, 2015
14	"La reunión de Perico y los españoles"	November 12, 2015
15	"Leonardo acepta a Inés"	November 13, 2015
16	"Ignacio traiciona a Perico"	November 16, 2015
17	"El falso embarazo de Cocó"	November 17, 2015
18	"Rubén besa a Yesenia"	November 18, 2015
19	"Santiago prepara su venganza"	November 19, 2015
20	"El Chamoy golpea a Santiago"	November 20, 2015
21	"Fernanda jura venganza"	November 23, 2015
22	"Se acerca la boda de Cocó y Leonardo"	November 24, 2015
23	"Perico conoce a Santiago"	November 25, 2015
24	"Sara descubre a Yesenia"	November 26, 2015
25	"La boda de Cocó y Leonardo"	November 27, 2015
26	"Santiago pierde la vista"	November 30, 2015
27	"La fortuna de los Fuentemayor peligra"	December 1, 2015
28	"Ignacio no es hijo de Humberto"	December 2, 2015
29	"Armando extorsiona"	December 3, 2015
30	"Fernanda acepta casarse con Perico"	December 4, 2015
31	"Humberto es sospecho de asesinato"	December 7, 2015
32	"Connie huye de su casa"	December 8, 2015
33	"Ignacio se convierte en director del Corporativo"	December 9, 2015
34	"Inés es acuchillada"	December 10, 2015
35	"Inés recupera el conocimiento"	December 11, 2015
36	"La exitosa inversión de Perico"	December 14, 2015
37	"Yesenia le pide perdón a Inés"	December 15, 2015
38	"Justino abusa de Tania"	December 16, 2015
39	"El triste pasado de Inés"	December 17, 2015
40	"El Chamoy investiga a Leonardo"	December 18, 2015
41	"Paloma y Leonardo hacen el amor"	December 21, 2015
42	"Justino descubre a Eugenio"	December 22, 2015
43	"Justino se enfrenta a Eugenio"	December 23, 2015
44	"Fernanda perdona a Perico"	December 24, 2015
45	"Fernanda termina su venganza por amor"	December 25, 2015
46	"La despedida de solteros de Inés y Jonathan"	December 28, 2015
47	"Jonathan es hospitalizado"	December 29, 2015
48	"La muerte de Jonathan"	December 30, 2015
49	"Ignacio conoce a Paloma"	December 31, 2015
50	"Paloma y Leonardo se comprometen"	January 1, 2016
51	"La amante de Perico"	January 4, 2016
52	"Santiago es declarado en libertad"	January 5, 2016
53	"Yesenia es descubierta"	January 6, 2016
54	"La desilusión de Fernanda"	January 7, 2016
55	"Fernanda cree las mentiras de Ignacio"	January 8, 2016
56	"Chamoy descubre a Perico"	January 11, 2016
57	"Tania cae en la trampa de Justino"	January 12, 2016
58	"Chamoy guarda el secreto de Perico"	January 13, 2016
59	"La desaparición de Tania"	January 14, 2016
60	"Lupita suplanta a Candy"	January 15, 2016
61	"Humberto corre a Basilio"	January 18, 2016
62	"Basilio regresa a la empresa"	January 19, 2016
63	"La boda de Fernanda y Perico"	January 20, 2016
64	"Fernanda se convierte en una Fuentemayor"	January 21, 2016
65	"Leonardo recuerda a Fernanda"	January 22, 2016
66	"Perico descubre la verdad"	January 25, 2016
67	"Justino corre a Eugenio"	January 26, 2016
68	"Paloma confronta a Justino"	January 27, 2016
69	"Justino intenta suicidarse"	January 28, 2016
70	"Justino amenaza a Tania"	January 29, 2016
71	"Ignacio defiende a Paloma"	February 1, 2016
72	"Paloma confunde a Perico"	February 2, 2016
73	"El corazón roto de Paloma"	February 3, 2016
74	"Perico le paga al Chamoy"	February 4, 2016
75	"Ignacio y los 2 Leonardos"	February 5, 2016
76	"Chamoy secuestra a Ignacio"	February 8, 2016
77	"Santiago descubre a Fernada"	February 9, 2016
78	"Ignacio confronta al verdadero Perico"	February 10, 2016
79	"Ignacio extorsiona a Perico"	February 11, 2016
80	"Leonardo encuentra a Perico"	February 12, 2016
81	"Renata descubre el secreto de Inés"	February 15, 2016
82	"Perico termina con Fernanda"	February 16, 2016
83	"El papá de Cachito"	February 17, 2016
84	"Leonardo descubre que tuvo un gemelo"	February 18, 2016
85	"Paloma desconfía de Ignacio"	February 19, 2016
86	"Fernanda descubre a Ignacio"	February 22, 2016
87	"Fernanda le pide perdón a Perico"	February 23, 2016
88	"Leonardo recuerda su nombre"	February 24, 2016
89	"Ignacio amenaza a Fernanda"	February 25, 2016
90	"Renata descubre toda la verdad"	February 26, 2016
91	"Justino es descubierto"	February 29, 2016
92	"Justino se queda sin familia"	March 1, 2016
93	"Leonardo y Paloma se reconcilian"	March 2, 2016
94	"Inés evita su muerte"	March 3, 2016
95	"Humberto anuncia su compromiso"	March 4, 2016
96	"Paloma confía en Leonardo"	March 7, 2016
97	"Ignacio recupera su celular"	March 8, 2016
98	"Paloma confronta a Ignacio"	March 9, 2016
99	"Fabiola busca venganza"	March 10, 2016
100	"Cachito descubre la verdad"	March 11, 2016
101	"Ignacio mata a Matías"	March 14, 2016
102	"El nuevo plan de Fabiola"	March 15, 2016
103	"Inés y Paloma dudan de Leonardo"	March 16, 2016
104	"La muerte de Renata al descubierto"	March 17, 2016
105	"Basilio descubre los planes de Ignacio"	March 18, 2016
106	"Paloma descubre toda la verdad"	March 21, 2016
107	"Leonardo contra Perico"	March 22, 2016
108	"Leonardo recupera su vida"	March 23, 2016
109	"Fernanda le revela toda la verdad a Perico"	March 24, 2016
110	"El falso secuestro de Leonardo"	March 25, 2016
111	"Perico se entrega a la policía"	March 28, 2016
112	"Inés descubre la verdad"	March 29, 2016
113	"Inés le revela la verdad a Humberto"	March 30, 2016
114	"Santiago recupera la vista"	March 31, 2016
115	"Perico se confiesa con Humberto"	April 1, 2016
116	"Humberto descubre a Ignacio y Fabiola"	April 4, 2016
117	"Perico le revela su identidad a Fernanda"	April 5, 2016
118	"La alianza de Fernanda y Leonardo"	April 6, 2016
119	"Los fraudes de Ignacio al descubierto"	April 7, 2016
120	"Gran Final"	April 8, 2016
