= List of Señorita Pólvora episodes =

Señorita Pólvora is a television series produced by Teleset for Sony Pictures Television and Televisa, which was broadcast in Latin America by TNT. It is the story of a beauty queen who gets involved in a hit, which leads to the premature death of her father.

== Episodes ==
| No. | Title | Original release date |
|---|---|---|
| 1 | "Reina Fugitiva" | March 16, 2015 |
| 2 | "El beso de la muerte" | March 16, 2015 |
| 3 | "Señorita venganza" | March 17, 2015 |
| 4 | "En busca de la verdad" | March 18, 2015 |
| 5 | "Adiós inocencia" | March 19, 2015 |
| 6 | "Dudas que duelen" | March 20, 2015 |
| 7 | "Hasta que la muerte los separe" | March 23, 2015 |
| 8 | "La hora de la verdad" | March 24, 2015 |
| 9 | "La sangre habla" | March 25, 2015 |
| 10 | "El cazador en la mira" | March 26, 2015 |
| 11 | "Romance con sangre" | March 27, 2015 |
| 12 | "Una elección de amor" | March 30, 2015 |
| 13 | "La foto que todos miran" | March 31, 2015 |
| 14 | "Mueren los buenos" | April 1, 2015 |
| 15 | "Todos son culpables" | April 2, 2015 |
| 16 | "La ruta del tatuaje" | April 3, 2015 |
| 17 | "Amor en duda" | April 6, 2015 |
| 18 | "El peligro acecha" | April 7, 2015 |
| 19 | "Espía por dos" | April 8, 2015 |
| 20 | "Donde hubo cenizas" | April 9, 2015 |
| 21 | "Modelos en guerra" | April 10, 2015 |
| 22 | "Inocencia robada" | April 13, 2015 |
| 23 | "Noche oscura" | April 14, 2015 |
| 24 | "Una gran elección" | April 15, 2015 |
| 25 | "El gran golpe" | April 16, 2015 |
| 26 | "Equipaje peligroso" | April 17, 2015 |
| 27 | "El corazón manda" | April 20, 2015 |
| 28 | "Tatuaje repetido" | April 21, 2015 |
| 29 | "Protege a tu cría" | April 22, 2015 |
| 30 | "Espía descubierta" | April 23, 2015 |
| 31 | "La verdad duele" | April 24, 2015 |
| 32 | "En las puertas del infierno" | April 27, 2015 |
| 33 | "La unión hace la fuerza" | April 28, 2015 |
| 34 | "Verdades reveladas" | April 29, 2015 |
| 35 | "Línea de fuego" | April 30, 2015 |
| 36 | "Callejón sin salida" | May 1, 2015 |
| 37 | "Quién es quién" | May 4, 2015 |
| 38 | "A un paso de la verdad" | May 5, 2015 |
| 39 | "Al descubierto" | May 6, 2015 |
| 40 | "Desconfianza" | May 7, 2015 |
| 41 | "Las pistas se unen" | May 8, 2015 |
| 42 | "Acorralados" | May 11, 2015 |
| 43 | "A todo o nada" | May 12, 2015 |
| 44 | "Si no puedes vencerlos, únete a ellos" | May 13, 2015 |
| 45 | "Confesiones" | May 14, 2015 |
| 46 | "Acuerdo de partes" | May 15, 2015 |
| 47 | "El dolor de la verdad" | May 18, 2015 |
| 48 | "El rugido de la pantera" | May 19, 2015 |
| 49 | "Una amenaza explosiva" | May 20, 2015 |
| 50 | "Cenizas de odio" | May 21, 2015 |
| 51 | "Nadie en quien confiar" | May 22, 2015 |
| 52 | "Hasta las últimas consecuencias" | May 25, 2015 |
| 53 | "Plan fallido" | May 26, 2015 |
| 54 | "Reina de la traición" | May 27, 2015 |
| 55 | "Señorita fugitiva" | May 28, 2015 |
| 56 | "Errores del pasado" | May 29, 2015 |
| 57 | "Corre Valentina corre" | June 1, 2015 |
| 58 | "Atrapados" | June 2, 2015 |
| 59 | "Sin salida" | June 3, 2015 |
| 60 | "Las horas contadas" | June 4, 2015 |
| 61 | "Atrapados" | June 5, 2015 |
| 62 | "A todo o nada" | June 8, 2015 |
| 63 | "Adiós" | June 9, 2015 |
| 64 | "Enjaulada" | June 10, 2015 |
| 65 | "Huellas del pasado" | June 11, 2015 |
| 66 | "La condena" | June 12, 2015 |
| 67 | "3 meses después" | June 15, 2015 |
| 68 | "Una amiga del pasado" | June 16, 2015 |
| 69 | "La prueba de la verdad" | June 17, 2015 |
| 70 | "Hasta siempre" | June 18, 2015 |
