= Reckless (British TV series) =

1997 British television serial

- Genre: Drama
- Written by: Paul Abbott
- Directed by: Sarah Harding (2 episodes); David Richards (4 episodes + sequel)
- Starring: Robson Green; Francesca Annis; Michael Kitchen
- Composers: Hal Lindes; Christopher Gunning
- Country of origin: United Kingdom
- Original language: English
- No. of episodes: 6 (series); 1 (sequel)

Production
- Executive producer: Carolyn Reynolds
- Producer: Sita Williams
- Running time: 60 minutes (with commercials)
- Production company: Granada Television

Original release
- Network: ITV
- Release: 6 February – 13 March 1997

Reckless is a British television serial written by Paul Abbott. Produced by Granada Television for the ITV network, it aired in six parts in the UK from 6 February to 13 March 1997.

A two-hour sequel, Reckless: The Sequel, was shown on 11 October 1998.

== Plot ==
Dr Owen Springer is a surgeon in his thirties, on his way from London to Manchester to move in with his ailing father. On the train journey, Owen needs to make an urgent phone call but the only person who will allow him to use her mobile phone is fellow passenger Anna Fairley, a beautiful woman in her forties. Unbeknownst to Owen, she is also the head of the management consultancy administering his forthcoming personality assessment for a new job at a local Manchester hospital. By the time of their second meeting, Owen has already developed romantic feelings towards Anna, though she spurns all his advances. To complicate matters further, Owen discovers Anna is also the wife of his new boss at the hospital, Dr Richard Crane. However, Owen discovers Richard is having an affair himself, knowledge which he uses to bring himself and Anna closer together.

== Cast ==
- Robson Green as Owen Springer
- Francesca Annis as Anna Fairley
- Michael Kitchen as Richard Crane
- David Bradley as Arnold Springer
- Daniela Nardini as Vivien Reid
- Conor Mullen as John McGinley
- Julian Rhind-Tutt as Danny Glassman
- Margery Mason as Myrtle Fairley
- Kathryn Hunt as Irma
- Kathryn Pogson as Phyllis
- Debra Stephenson as Michelle

== Production ==
Reckless was produced by Granada Television for the ITV network.

== Broadcast ==
The series aired in six parts in the UK from 6 February to 13 March 1997.

A two-hour sequel, Reckless: The Sequel, was shown on 11 October 1998.

The series was shown in the United States as part of PBS' Masterpiece Theatre. For that airing every two episodes were combined, resulting in only three episodes, each running about 90 mins without commercials (excluding PBS intros).

== Reception ==
Adam Sweeting, reviewing for The Guardian, poked fun at the story's implausibilities but called it "a balance of action, character and situation that sparkled with wit and charm".

== Awards and nominations ==
- BAFTA Television Award - Best Actress - Francesca Annis (nominated)
- Royal Television Society Award - Best Writer - Paul Abbott (nominated)
- Royal Television Society Award - Best Actor - Robson Green (nominated)
- National Television Awards - Most Popular Drama (won)
- National Television Awards - Most Popular Actor - Robson Green (nominated)

== DVD ==
Reckless and its sequel are available on DVD, distributed by Acorn Media UK.
