= List of Fire Country Episodes =

Fire Country is an American drama television series that premiered on CBS on October 7, 2022. The series follows Bode Leone, a young man who seeks to have his prison sentence reduced by joining a voluntary inmate firefighting program in Northern California. The show was created by Max Thieriot, Joan Rater, and Tony Phelan. As of 2026, the series has aired four seasons comprising 72 episodes.

Season	Episodes	Originally released	
Season	Episodes	First released	Last released
1	22	October 7, 2022	May 19, 2023
2	10	February 16, 2024	May 17, 2024
3	20	October 18, 2024	April 25, 2025
4	20	October 17, 2025	May 22, 2026
5	13	October 9, 2026	TBA

== Season 1 (2022-23) ==
No. overall	No. in season	Title	Directed by	Written by	Original release date	U.S. viewers (millions)
1	1	"Pilot"	James Strong	Teleplay by : Joan Rater & Tony Phelan; Story by : Joan Rater & Tony Phelan & Max Thieriot	October 7, 2022	5.91
2	2	"The Fresh Prince of Edgewater"	Dermott Downs	Natalia Fernàndez	October 14, 2022	5.80
3	3	"Where There's Smoke..."	Eagle Egilsson	David Gould	October 21, 2022	5.26
4	4	"Work, Don't Worry"	Jacquie Gould	Tonya Kong	October 28, 2022	5.30
5	5	"Get Some, Be Safe"	Gonzalo Amat	Barbara Kaye Friend	November 4, 2022	5.53
6	6	"Like Old Times"	Erica Watson	Sara Casey & Manuel Herrera	November 18, 2022	5.47
7	7	"Happy to Help"	Antonio Negret	Dwain Worrell	December 2, 2022	5.46
8	8	"Bad Guy"	Kevin Alejandro	Tia Napolitano	December 9, 2022	5.59
9	9	"No Good Deed"	Sarah Wayne Callies	Tia Napolitano & Julia Fontana	January 6, 2023	6.57
10	10	"Get Your Hopes Up"	Laura Nisbet Peters	Natalia Fernàndez	January 13, 2023	5.95
11	11	"Mama Bear"	Anton L. Cropper	David Gould	January 20, 2023	6.10
12	12	"Two Pink Lines"	Dermott Downs	Joan Rater & Tony Phelan	January 29, 2023	10.08
Note: This episode aired after CBS's broadcast of the AFC Championship Game.
13	13	"You Know Your Dragon Best"	Marie Jamora	Tia Napolitano & Barbara Kaye Friend	February 3, 2023	6.37
14	14	"A Fair to Remember"	Kantú Lentz	Sara Casey & Manuel Herrera	February 10, 2023	6.49
15	15	"False Promises"	C. Chi-Yoon Chung	Natalia Fernàndez	March 3, 2023	6.00
16	16	"My Kinda Leader"	Eagle Egilsson	Dwain Worrell	March 10, 2023	5.59
17	17	"A Cry for Help"	Gonzalo Amat	Julia Fontana	March 31, 2023	5.27
18	18	"Off the Rails"	Bill Purple	Tia Napolitano & David Gould	April 7, 2023	6.09
19	19	"Watch Your Step"	Lisa Demaine	Joelle Garfinkel	April 21, 2023	5.82
20	20	"At the End of My Rope"	Joy Lane	Julia Fontana & Barbara Kaye Friend	May 5, 2023	5.32
21	21	"Backfire"	Max Thieriot	David Gould	May 12, 2023	5.06
22	22	"I Know It Feels Impossible"	Dermott Downs	Tia Napolitano	May 19, 2023	5.32

== Season 2 (2024) ==
No. overall	No. in season	Title	Directed by	Written by	Original release date	U.S. viewers (millions)
23	1	"Something's Coming"	Bill Purple	Tia Napolitano	February 16, 2024	5.71
24	2	"Like Breathing Again"	Kevin Alejandro	Natalia Fernàndez	February 23, 2024	5.23
25	3	"See You Next Apocalypse"	Kantú Lentz	Dwain Worrell	March 1, 2024	5.25
26	4	"Too Many Unknowns"	Nicole Rubio	Barbara Kaye Friend	March 15, 2024	5.06
27	5	"This Storm Will Pass"	Eagle Egilsson	David Gould	April 5, 2024	4.95
28	6	"Alert the Sheriff"	Max Thieriot	Teleplay by : Joan Rater & Tony Phelan; Story by : Joan Rater & Tony Phelan & Max Thieriot	April 12, 2024	5.05
29	7	"A Hail Mary"	Marie Jamora	Sara Casey & Manuel Herrera	April 26, 2024	5.06
30	8	"It's Not Over"	Gonzalo Amat	India Gurley	May 3, 2024	5.00
31	9	"No Future, No Consequences"	Sarah Wayne Callies	Anupam Nigam	May 10, 2024	4.67
32	10	"I Do"	Bill Purple	Tia Napolitano & William Harper	May 17, 2024	5.22

== Season 3 (2024–25) ==
No. overall	No. in season	Title	Directed by	Written by	Original release date	U.S. viewers (millions)
33	1	"What the Bride Said"	Bill Purple	Tia Napolitano	October 18, 2024	4.55
34	2	"Firing Squad"	Gonzalo Amat	Anupam Nigam	October 25, 2024	4.33
35	3	"Welcome to the Cult"	Diane Farr	Tia Napolitano & Barbara Kaye Friend	November 1, 2024	4.60
36	4	"Keep Your Cool"	Nicole Rubio	India Gurley	November 8, 2024	4.46
37	5	"Edgewater's About to Get Real Cozy"	Mark Tonderai	Jen Klein	November 15, 2024	4.26
38	6	"Not Without My Birds"	Alexis Ostrander	Teleplay by : Barbara Kaye Friend; Story by : Joe Hortua	November 22, 2024	4.74
39	7	"False Alarm"	Sarah Wayne Callies	Jacqueline Furnare Donabedian	December 6, 2024	4.51
40	8	"Promise Me"	Eagle Egilsson	Joe Hortua	December 13, 2024	4.54
41	9	"Coming in Hot"	Kevin Alejandro	Tia Napolitano	January 31, 2025	3.80
42	10	"The Leone Way"	Rubin Garcia	Sara Casey & Manuel Herrera	February 7, 2025	4.34
43	11	"Fare Thee Well"	Desdemona Chiang	Anupam Nigam	February 14, 2025	4.10
44	12	"I'm the One Who Just Goes Away"	Bill Purple	Jen Klein	February 21, 2025	4.47
45	13	"My Team"	Kate Phelan	Barbara Kaye Friend	February 28, 2025	4.29
46	14	"Death Trap"	Leslie Alejandro	Carrie Williams	March 7, 2025	4.12
47	15	"One Last Time"	Jason Hellmann	Joe Hortua	March 14, 2025	4.24
48	16	"Dirty Money"	James Strong	Joan Rater & Tony Phelan	April 4, 2025	4.00
49	17	"Fire and Ice"	Gabriel Correa	Sara Casey & Manuel Herrera	April 11, 2025	4.21
50	18	"Eyes and Ears Everywhere"	Freddie Highmore	Nick Spates	April 18, 2025	4.30
51	19	"A Change in the Wind"	Max Thieriot	Jen Klein	April 25, 2025	3.97
52	20	"I'd Do It Again"	Bill Purple	Tia Napolitano	April 25, 2025	3.97

== Season 4 (2025–26) ==
No. overall	No. in season	Title	Directed by	Written by	Original release date	U.S. viewers (millions)
53	1	"Goodbye for Now"	James Strong	Tia Napolitano	October 17, 2025	4.11
54	2	"Not a Stray"	Bill Purple	Anupam Nigam	October 24, 2025	3.88
55	3	"The Tiny Ways We Start to Heal"	Sarah Wayne Callies	Jen Klein & Carrie Williams	October 31, 2025	3.52
56	4	"Like a Wounded Wildebeest"	Jordan Calloway	Joe Hortua	November 7, 2025	3.86
57	5	"Happy First Day, Manny"	J. Michael Muro	Sara Casey & Manuel Herrera	November 14, 2025	3.86
58	6	"Your Voice in My Head"	Catherine Mallette	India Gurley	November 21, 2025	3.70
59	7	"Best Mom in the World"	Alexis Ostrander	Jen Klein	December 5, 2025	N/A
60	8	"Fresh Start"	Oscar Rene Lozoya	Jacqueline Furnare Donabedian & Anupam Nigam	December 12, 2025	N/A
61	9	"Who Owns the Dirt"	Eagle Egilsson	Tia Napolitano & Barbara Kaye Friend	December 19, 2025	N/A
62	10	"On the Carpet"	Bill Purple	Joe Hortua	February 27, 2026	N/A
63	11	"Elite of the Elite"	Leslie Alejandro	Sara Casey & Manuel Herrera	March 6, 2026	N/A
64	12	"Life of a Firefighter"	Kate Phelan	Matt Bosack	March 13, 2026	N/A
65	13	"The Bravest"	Bill Purple	Teleplay by : Barbara Kaye Friend; Story by : Barbara Kaye Friend & David Gould	April 3, 2026	N/A
Bode and Boone become trapped in the container underground with the kidnapped kids. Wes narrowly saves Sharon from an IED, but Jake is forced to set several off to clear a path. Margot, Violet's sister, goes into anaphylaxis from mold and stops breathing, forcing Boone to overcome his claustrophobia and dig out to 42 and Three Rock as they dig down simultaneously. The kids are successfully rescued, and Jake is able to revive Margot. With the help of Ruby Quinn and Gina and a clue from the kids, Mickey and Sharon identify the culprits as the quarry guards, the bus driver and their terminally ill friend, all of whom lost their homes to Cal Fire and the sheriff's department as kids to make way for building the quarry. Mickey and Sharon mend their quarrel over Ruby while Boone tears up a speeding ticket he had given Bode. This is the conclusion of a two-part crossover that began on Sheriff Country.
66	14	"Why Not Now?"	Jason Hellmann	India Gurley	April 10, 2026	N/A
67	15	"Making Things Go Boom"	Jules Latimer	Jen Klein	April 17, 2026	N/A
68	16	"Not Worth the Risk"	Gabriel Correa	Miriam Sachs	April 24, 2026	N/A
69	17	"Sometimes the Chaos Wins"	Nicole Rubio	Obiageli Odimegwu & Carrie Williams	May 1, 2026	N/A
70	18	"Best Man"	Diane Farr	Sara Casey & Manuel Herrera	May 8, 2026	N/A
71	19	"Rain Check for Tomorrow"	Ruben Garcia	Barbara Kaye Friend	May 15, 2026	N/A
72	20	"Try Not to Drown"	Gonzalo Amat	Joe Hortua	May 22, 2026	N/A
As the Pineville Dam disaster turns into a flood of biblical proportions, Sharon and Richards coordinate rescue efforts while Bode, Jake and Danny are trapped in Danny's rapidly flooding cabin, and Manny tries to protect the hospital where Roberta is undergoing surgery with only Eve and Three Rock for backup. With the situation rapidly worsening, Jake takes Danny's kayak to a nearby boat ramp, bringing back Sharon and Richards to rescue Bode and Danny. Danny decides not to prosecute Bode and reconnect with his family. At a critical part in the Roberta's surgery, Three Rock makes a heroic effort to move the hospital's generator to higher ground with Hartman stepping up as a leader. Roberta's surgery is a success and in the aftermath, Jake and Violet get married, Bode admits his love for Chloe and Sharon goes on a trip with Alexei. Bode and Sharon give Vince and Sharon's wedding rings to Jake and Violet to replace their lost rings.

== Season 5 (2026-27) ==
No. overall	No. in season	Title	Directed by	Written by	Original release date	U.S. viewers (millions)
73	1	"Founders’ Day"	Ruben Garcia	Eric Guggenheim	October 9, 2026	TBD
