= List of El Dragón: Return of a Warrior episodes =

El Dragón: Return of a Warrior, is a Spanish-language crime drama television series created by Arturo Pérez-Reverte for Televisa and Univision. The series premiered first in the United States on 30 September 2019 on Univision, and its first season ended on 22 November 2019 with a total of 38 episodes. While the second season premiered on 25 November 2019 only in the United States, and is scheduled to conclude on 20 January 2020.

== Series overview ==
Series	Episodes	Originally released		
Series	Episodes	First released	Last released	Network
1	38	30 September 2019	22 November 2019	Univision
2	44	25 November 2019	20 January 2020	Univision

== Episodes ==
=== Season 1 (2019) ===
No. overall	No. in season	Title	Original release date	U.S. viewers (millions)
1	1	"Chapter 1"	30 September 2019	1.43
Miguel returns to Mexico after many years to help his grandfather with his business, since Epigmenio, his biggest rival is determined to end him and his family.
2	2	"Chapter 2"	1 October 2019	1.28
Lamberto tells Epigmenio and his people that Miguel will be the new head of the Salado group. Asya confesses to Miguel that she suffers from multiple sclerosis, he tries to find a way to help her, but things don't go as expected.
3	3	"Chapter 3"	2 October 2019	1.14
Adela almost runs over Miguel, but they become friends after the incident. Chisca blames Miguel for Asya's suicide without knowing she was sick and he suffers for his loss.
4	4	"Chapter 4"	3 October 2019	1.37
Lamberto suffers a pre-heart attack and Chisca plans to warn Miguel, but Dora demands her not to tell him anything. Miguel starts with his plan to grow Lamberto's business and gets involved with very dangerous people.
5	5	"Chapter 5"	4 October 2019	1.30
Miguel plans to take his family to the city, but Lamberto's partners forbid it. Epigmenio confesses to Lamberto what he knows about Margarita's death, he gets very bad and dies.
6	6	"Chapter 6"	7 October 2019	1.34
After Lamberto's death, Miguel manages to take his brother and sister to the city as promised. Chisca kicks out Adela from the house, but Miguel defends her and tries to convince her to stay.
7	7	"Chapter 7"	8 October 2019	1.35
Miguel discovers that Jimena carries a gun in her purse, she tells him that she needs it to defend herself in case of an attack now that she will do illegal business. Miguel meets Manuel, a great hacker just out of prison, with whom he plans to do business.
8	8	"Chapter 8"	9 October 2019	1.41
Dora tells one of her men that she does not agree that Miguel will take over the business, because she fears losing everything. Chisca meets Flaco and asks for help investigating Valentín, the man who abused her.
9	9	"Chapter 9"	10 October 2019	1.22
Jorge asks Miguel for permission to work in the company with Flaco and Kenia and he accepts. Jimena manages to enter the auction to win an engine prototype that Miguel needs for his business.
10	10	"Chapter 10"	11 October 2019	1.32
Chisca travels to Madrid determined to take revenge on Valentín. Kenia and Flaco manage to find Peligros and take him to the hospital to save his life.
11	11	"Chapter 11"	14 October 2019	1.13
Jaramillo's men, a Colombian drug dealer, catch Miguel and torture him to find out who he is—he is brutally beaten, electroshocked, and waterboarded. Chisca spends the night with Valentín.
12	12	"Chapter 12"	15 October 2019	1.17
Jorge decides to bring a gift to Kenia and discovers that she has a girlfriend. Chisca's plan works and Valentín decides to go look for her in the city.
13	13	"Chapter 13"	16 October 2019	1.15
Valentín and Chisca rob from a store and a security guard discovers them. Jimena confesses to Miguel that she likes him.
14	14	"Chapter 14"	17 October 2019	1.30
Miguel invites Adela to an important presentation of ecological tires and Jimena becomes jealous when she finds out. Ulises puts a microphone in Adela's bag to investigate Miguel.
15	15	"Chapter 15"	18 October 2019	1.28
Adela agrees to impersonate an important racing driver and is almost discovered by the police. Valentín is determined to use Chisca to keep all of Miguel's business and money.
16	16	"Chapter 16"	21 October 2019	1.02
Adela and Miguel are attacked by some Russians in Miami. Valentín convinces Chisca to lie to Miguel so that he doesn't discover that she used drugs with him. Howard assures Miguel that he will discover all his illegal businesses to send him to prison.
17	17	"Chapter 17"	22 October 2019	0.97
Jimena is upset to learn that Miguel plans to help a woman escape from a men's club. Epigmenio kidnaps Jimena and asks her to spy on Miguel.
18	18	"Chapter 18"	23 October 2019	1.07
The Pacheco brothers kill Dora's men and abuse her. Jorge is mugged and beaten and asks Chisca not to tell Miguel.
19	19	"Chapter 19"	24 October 2019	1.10
Kenia takes Jorge home so he doesn't find out that Dora was kidnapped. Miguel manages to rescue Dora and get rid of the Pacheco brothers.
20	20	"Chapter 20"	25 October 2019	1.10
El Tata tells Dora that the father of the Pacheco brothers wants revenge and plans to kill Miguel. Jimena confesses to Miguel that one of his enemies offered her a lot of money to spy on him.
21	21	"Chapter 21"	28 October 2019	1.15
22	22	"Chapter 22"	29 October 2019	1.02
23	23	"Chapter 23"	30 October 2019	0.92
24	24	"Chapter 24"	31 October 2019	1.01
25	25	"Chapter 25"	1 November 2019	1.05
26	26	"Chapter 26"	4 November 2019	0.98
27	27	"Chapter 27"	5 November 2019	1.01
28	28	"Chapter 28"	6 November 2019	1.17
29	29	"Chapter 29"	7 November 2019	1.10
30	30	"Chapter 30"	8 November 2019	1.12
31	31	"Chapter 31"	11 November 2019	1.05
32	32	"Chapter 32"	12 November 2019	1.15
33	33	"Chapter 33"	13 November 2019	1.16
34	34	"Chapter 34"	18 November 2019	1.10
35	35	"Chapter 35"	19 November 2019	1.14
36	36	"Chapter 36"	20 November 2019	1.10
37	37	"Chapter 37"	21 November 2019	1.09
38	38	"Chapter 38"	22 November 2019	1.11

=== Season 2 (2019–20) ===
No. overall	No. in season	Title	Original release date	U.S. viewers (millions)
39	1	"Chapter 1"	25 November 2019	1.39
40	2	"Chapter 2"	26 November 2019	1.20
41	3	"Chapter 3"	27 November 2019	1.39
42	4	"Chapter 4"	27 November 2019	1.32
43	5	"Chapter 5"	29 November 2019	1.38
44	6	"Chapter 6"	29 November 2019	1.26
45	7	"Chapter 7"	2 December 2019	1.31
46	8	"Chapter 8"	3 December 2019	1.22
47	9	"Chapter 9"	4 December 2019	1.17
48	10	"Chapter 10"	6 December 2019	1.17
49	11	"Chapter 11"	9 December 2019	1.26
50	12	"Chapter 12"	10 December 2019	1.37
51	13	"Chapter 13"	11 December 2019	1.36
52	14	"Chapter 14"	12 December 2019	1.22
53	15	"Chapter 15"	13 December 2019	0.87
54	16	"Chapter 16"	16 December 2019	1.33
55	17	"Chapter 17"	17 December 2019	1.40
56	18	"Chapter 18"	18 December 2019	1.26
57	19	"Chapter 19"	19 December 2019	1.40
58	20	"Chapter 20"	20 December 2019	1.31
59	21	"Chapter 21"	23 December 2019	1.36
60	22	"Chapter 22"	25 December 2019	0.97
61	23	"Chapter 23"	26 December 2019	1.26
62	24	"Chapter 24"	27 December 2019	1.38
63	25	"Chapter 25"	27 December 2019	1.38
64	26	"Chapter 26"	30 December 2019	1.30
65	27	"Chapter 27"	30 December 2019	1.30
66	28	"Chapter 28"	1 January 2020	1.25
67	29	"Chapter 29"	1 January 2020	1.25
68	30	"Chapter 30"	2 January 2020	1.48
69	31	"Chapter 31"	2 January 2020	1.48
70	32	"Chapter 32"	3 January 2020	1.54
71	33	"Chapter 33"	3 January 2020	1.54
72	34	"Chapter 34"	6 January 2020	1.32
73	35	"Chapter 35"	7 January 2020	1.40
74	36	"Chapter 36"	8 January 2020	1.28
75	37	"Chapter 37"	9 January 2020	1.46
76	38	"Chapter 38"	10 January 2020	1.43
77	39	"Chapter 39"	13 January 2020	1.41
78	40	"Chapter 40"	14 January 2020	1.65
79	41	"Chapter 41"	15 January 2020	1.70
80	42	"Chapter 42"	16 January 2020	1.49
81	43	"Chapter 43"	17 January 2020	1.60
82	44	"Chapter 44"	20 January 2020	1.73
