= List of Masterpiece Mystery! episodes =

This is the list of Masterpiece Mystery! episodes in order by season.

== Episodes ==
In January 2008, Masterpiece Theatre and its affiliated program Mystery! were reformatted as Masterpiece. Masterpiece is aired as three different series. Initially, Masterpiece Classic aired in the winter and early spring (hosted by Gillian Anderson), Masterpiece Mystery! in the late spring and summer, and Masterpiece Contemporary in the fall. In later seasons, particularly after an increase in funding for WGBH and Masterpiece, the scheduling became more random. Currently, all three programs air at any time throughout the year, and on nearly half the Sundays, two episodes from two different miniseries will air on the same night.

This lists the titles of the individual miniseries. Some ran for only one episode, many ran for two or more installments. The following lists them according to original season, and then in alphabetical order. Also included are the original UK series and episode numbers for each program, when they differ from the US numbers. The number of the season continues in the sequence set by the predecessor series, Masterpiece Theatre, which ended with Season 37. This is in spite of the fact that the other predecessor series, Mystery!, ended with Season 27. All episodes that air in one calendar year are considered to be in the same season.

For lists of episodes of the other two series, see List of Masterpiece Classic episodes, and List of Masterpiece Contemporary episodes. For older episodes of Mystery!, see List of Mystery episodes.

This list does not include any rebroadcasts of series, including those previously shown on Masterpiece Theatre or Mystery!

=== Season 38 (2008) ===
- Inspector Lewis, Series I (June 22, 29 and July 6)
- Foyle's War, Series V (July 13, 20 and 27)
- The Inspector Lynley Mysteries, Series VII (UK Series VI) (Aug 10 and 17)
- The Sally Lockhart Mysteries: The Shadow in the North (Sept 28)

=== Season 39 (2009) ===
- Wallander, Series I (May 10, 17 and 31)
- Six By Agatha
  - Agatha Christie's Marple, Series IV (July 5, 12, 19 and 26)
  - Agatha Christie's Poirot, Series IX (UK Series XI: 1-2) (June 21 and 28)
- Inspector Lewis, Series II (UK Series II: 1-4 and Series III: 1-3) (Aug 30, Sept 6, 13, 20, Oct 4, 11, and 18)

=== Season 40 (2010) ===
- Foyle's War, Series VI (May 2, 9 and 16)
- Six By Agatha
  - Agatha Christie's Marple, Series V (UK Series V: 2-4) (May 23, June 20 and 27).
  - Agatha Christie's Poirot, Series X (UK Series XII: 3 & Series XI: 3-4) (July 11, 18 and 25)
- David Suchet on the Orient Express - A Masterpiece Special (Wed, July 7)
- Inspector Lewis, Series III (UK Series III: 4 and Series IV: 1-4) (Aug 29, Sept 5, 12, 19, and 26)
- Wallander, Series II (Oct 3, 10 and 17)
- Sherlock, Series I (Oct 24, 31 and Nov 7)

=== Season 41 (2011) ===
- Agatha Christie Mysteries
  - Agatha Christie's Poirot, Series XI (UK Series XII: 1,2,4) (June 19, 26 and July 3)
  - Agatha Christie's Marple, Series VI (UK Series V: 1) (July 10)
- Zen, Series I (July 17, 24 and 31)
- Inspector Lewis, Series IV (UK Series V) (Sept 4, 18, 25 and Oct 9)
- Case Histories, Series I (Oct 16, 23 and 30)

=== Season 42 (2012) ===
- Sherlock, Series II (May 6, 13, and 20)
- Endeavour (UK Pilot) (July 1)
- Inspector Lewis, Series V (UK Series VI) (July 8, 15, 22, and 29)
- Wallander, Series III (Sept 9, 16, and 23)

In September 2012, the Masterpiece website dropped the three distinctive "Classic", "Mystery", and "Contemporary" sub-labels and placed everything within the singular "Masterpiece" label.
