= Alejandro Durán =

Mexican actor

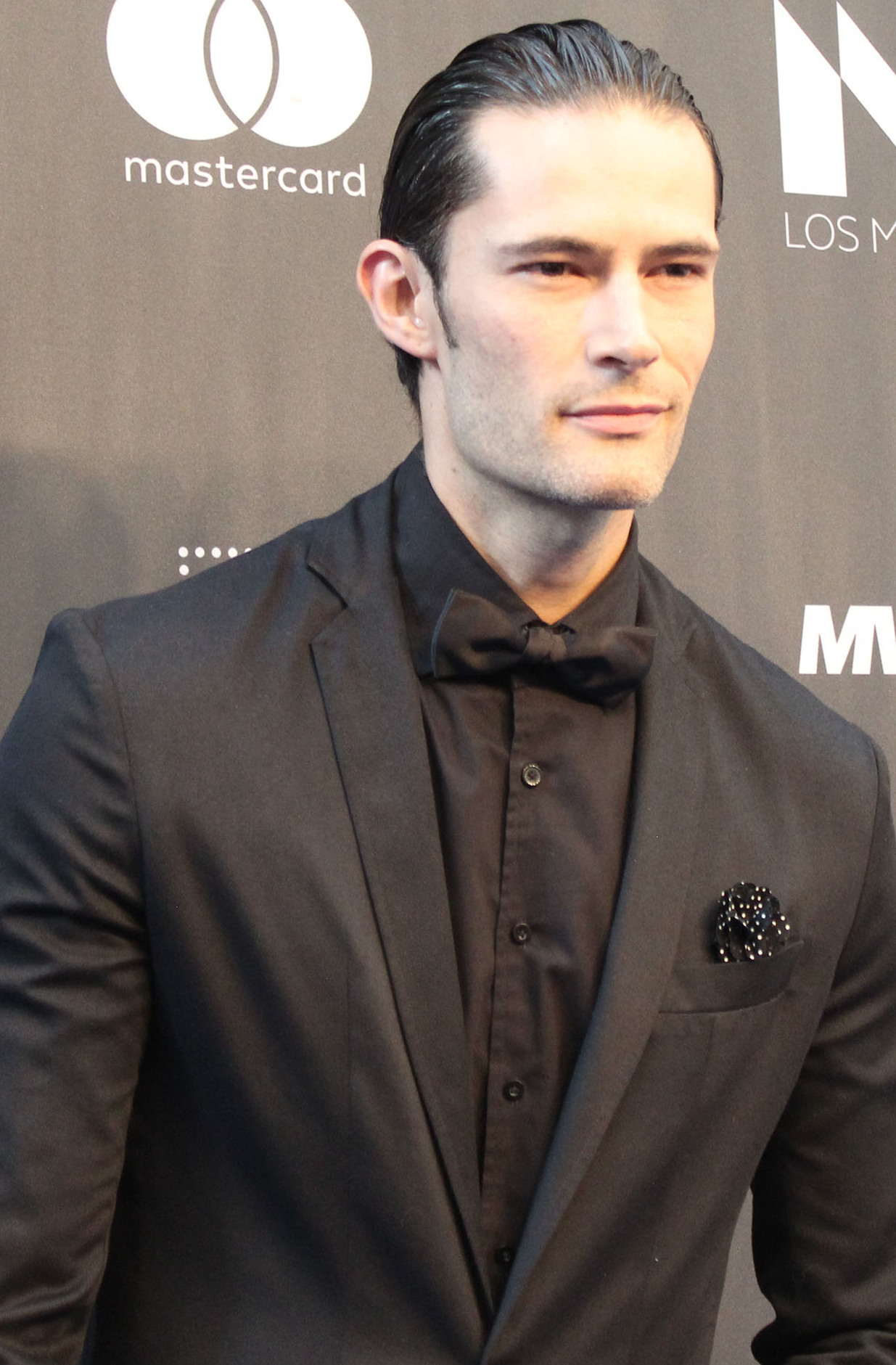
- Durán at the 2019 Metropolitan Theatre Awards
- Born: Alejandro Durán Fernández; San Luis Potosí, Mexico
- Other names: Alex Durán
- Occupation: Actor
- Years active: 2004-present

Alejandro Durán Fernández (born in San Luis Potosí, Mexico), is a Mexican television actor.
