= Mystery! =

US television series

- Title card
- Genre: Anthology; Mystery
- Presented by: Gene Shalit; Vincent Price; Diana Rigg
- Countries of origin: United States; United Kingdom
- Original language: English

Production
- Production companies: WGBH (component programs produced by various entities including the BBC and ITV operators)

Original release
- Network: PBS
- Release: February 5, 1980 – October 14, 2007

Mystery! is an anthology television series produced by WGBH Boston for PBS in the United States.

The series was created as a mystery, police and crime drama spin-off of the PBS show Masterpiece Theatre. From 1980 to 2007, Mystery! aired mostly British crime series purchased from or co-produced with the BBC or ITV and adapted from British mystery fiction. In 2002, due to pressure to include more American material, a series based on the novels of US mystery writer Tony Hillerman was produced, but the vast majority of Mystery! programming has always been and continues to be British literary adaptations co-produced with UK-based production companies.

In 2008, PBS combined Mystery! with its predecessor Masterpiece Theatre under the umbrella title Masterpiece, which includes the sub-brands Masterpiece Classic, Masterpiece Mystery!, and Masterpiece Contemporary.

== Edward Gorey, Derek Lamb, and the Mystery! opening sequence ==
Mystery! is noted for its animated opening and closing title sequences with original drawings created by cartoonist Edward Gorey and animated by Eugene Federenko, Derek Lamb, and Janet Perlman, with music by Normand Roger. A PBS veteran, animator Lamb had also created programming for series like Sesame Street, The Electric Company, and The Great American Dream Machine.

Gorey's first attempt at creating a storyboard of the opening was estimated to run 10 minutes. Because executive producer Joan Wilson was looking for a 75-second sequence, Gorey was eventually asked to hand over the drawings and allow animators to use his work as inspiration. Gorey, known for his eccentric and stubborn nature, recounted:

When we first started talking about it, I gave them a scenario for the credits, but they said, 'Thank you, very much, dear, but this will take half an hour.' I told them it wouldn't if they put in on at a reasonable rate of speed, but they didn't seem to care for that idea very much. So Derek Lamb or somebody concocted the final scenario and I had very little to do with it.

The Lamb/Gorey sequence has changed several times since 1980. It consisted of a non-linear series of animated period country house tableaux. The scenes include a formal ball, a crowd of umbrella-toting funeral attendants, three investigators, a croquet game in the rain, and a moaning damsel in various scenes of distress. Over time, the sequence became more streamlined, shorter, and slightly more colorful. For the Hillerman episodes, the American flag was worked into the opening title sequence.

Today, the Masterpiece opening sequence is almost identical across the sub-brands. Each opening fades in and out of scenes of popular characters from each series. The Mystery! version still features the Gorey/Lamb characters.

== Inception and early history ==
Mystery! was the second British anthology to come to WGBH Boston after Masterpiece Theatre. In 1979 Herb Schmertz, head of corporate affairs at Mobil Oil, offered the idea of an all-British crime series show to WGBH manager Henry Becton. Mobil Oil was already the underwriter for Masterpiece Theater and had seen success with high-profile British series, including The Six Wives of Henry VIII and Elizabeth R. By 1979, WGBH was bringing in a diverse array of British programming, to the point that Mobil saw an advantage to creating a unique time slot for the crime/police drama genre. Mobil spent $2.3 million in 1979 and $3.2 million in 1980 toward the shows it sponsored on PBS, including for the kickoff of Mystery! Not everyone was especially enthusiastic over the genre division between Masterpiece Theater and Mystery! Then Masterpiece Theater host Alistair Cooke initially bemoaned the loss of the crime genre:

I tell you one thing that makes life a little more difficult in choosing was since the arrival of Mystery. We're not able to have the change of pace and tone that we had when we could have had Thomas Hardy and Balzac and then had Lord Peter Wimsey. You know that's denied us know [sic], of course, because it goes to Mystery.

One of Mystery!'s early successes was Rumpole of the Bailey. Other noted successes include The Adventures of Sherlock Holmes starring Jeremy Brett in the title role, Inspector Morse with John Thaw, Brother Cadfael starring Derek Jacobi, and Prime Suspect starring Helen Mirren. Agatha Christie sleuths Hercule Poirot (David Suchet) and Miss Marple (at various times Joan Hickson, Geraldine McEwan, and Julia McKenzie) have also been featured.

Mystery! won both the 1988 Anthony Award and the 1991 Anthony Award for "Best Television Show".

== Hosts ==
The first host of the show in 1980 was Gene Shalit. In the first broadcast, February 5, 1980, Shalit opened with the introduction: "Good evening. We're about to set out on a series of entertaining mysteries—15 weeks of suspenseful, sophisticated, crafty conundrums that are darkly diabolical or amusing adventures with introductions that suddenly seem alarmingly alliterative." Shalit left the show in 1981.

Vincent Price took the reins in Mystery!'s second year. Price's introductions included haunted house gags, such as walking through cobwebs and ducking under spiders and bats. He came to Boston twice a year to tape openings and closings for the show. Actress Katherine Emory called Price "the sweetest scary man I ever met". Price was in his seventies when he hosted the show, and eventually had to step down due to failing health in 1989.

Diana Rigg took over as host in 1989 and had the opportunity to introduce two mystery series in which she was the star: Mother Love and The Mrs Bradley Mysteries. Rigg had previously won a BAFTA Award for her work on Masterpiece Theater's 1985 Bleak House adaptation. She left Mystery! in 2003.

Beginning in 2004, Mystery! aired without a host. When the show was rebranded under the Masterpiece umbrella in 2008, actor Alan Cumming became the host.

== Funding trouble: 1996–2007 ==
In the summer of 1995, Mobil announced that it would stop funding Mystery! at the end of the season. Its underwritten series Masterpiece Theater and Mystery! had been losing audiences for some time.

"Many times, over the years, we've watched our best mini-series debut with a flourish ... only to see the audience gently or not so gently erode over the weeks," executive producer Rebecca Eaton said, citing last year's Middlemarch as an example.

Although Mobil had been experiencing restructuring, cutting 1,250 employees, the company refused to blame its actions on cost-cutting. The company announced that it would stay with Masterpiece Theater at least through 1999, though it didn't leave as underwriter until 2004. After the ExxonMobil merger in 1999, the company reoriented its philanthropic mission to support public health and environmental causes, dropping its commitment to public television. PBS had avoided adding 30-second advertisements before programming blocks, despite underwriters' requests for more robust representation on the channel. Mobil swore that the decision had nothing to do with PBS's hesitancy in implementing 30-second advertising spots for its underwriters. Since 1980, Mobil had covered the entire cost of acquiring, repackaging, and promoting British dramas for PBS, which had typically cost the company around $10 million a year. Without Mobil, Masterpiece Theater and Mystery! were left without consistent support until 2011.

As a result of Mobil's initial break from Mystery!, Eaton and her staff began looking for newer, more "relevant" stories to tell in both shows. They also looked to past successes for help. Prime Suspect had gained a strong following in the US as well as England, so PBS re-ran Series 4 on Masterpiece Theater during the 1995–1996 season.

PBS shifted Mystery! in 2002 from its Thursday prime-time slot during the regular American TV season to Sunday nights in the summer. Mystery! continued as a summer series from 2002 to 2004 with shows like The Inspector Lynley Mysteries, Hetty Wainthropp Investigates and Foyle's War.

== 2008 format change ==
In 2008, the series moved to Masterpiece (formerly Masterpiece Theatre) and began using the banner as Masterpiece Mystery!, and the theme music was also changed. It now carried a signature theme based on its sister program's former theme. This version is hosted by Alan Cumming.

Rebecca Eaton reflected on the 2008 changes in an interview with Diane Rehm, citing Mobil's departure, a competitive media landscape, and trouble branding Masterpiece Theater and Mystery! to new audiences. Eaton said:

I realized that this ship of whom I was the captain was at risk of going down, and that I had to do something. And I truly did not know what to do and had no money to do anything anyway. But we got a grant from the Corporation for Public Broadcasting and PBS which we were pretty much allowed to do anything with...we spent it on doing some research into how people perceived Masterpiece. And discovered that they used to watch it, they loved it, they regarded it very highly. They weren't watching it so much anymore. They thought it was too hard to find...And a lot of people were put off by the title. They thought, oh it sounds like it will be very challenging. It sounds like homework... We didn't change the content because we realized whenever anybody, particularly younger viewers watched it, watched Madame Bovary or Sense and Sensibility or Bleak House, they loved it. It was just sort of getting past the rather forbidding title of Masterpiece Theater and the confusing anthology nature.

== In popular culture ==
- Mystery! was parodied by Sesame Street's "Mysterious Theatre" sketches in the early 1990s, hosted by the Muppet character Vincent Twice (whose name was always said twice), a parody of Vincent Price.
- The 1990s Mystery! opening was parodied on a 1998 episode of a fellow WGBH program Arthur entitled "Binky Rules."

== List of series presented on Mystery! ==
- The Adventures of Sherlock Holmes with Jeremy Brett broadcast as:
  - The Adventures of Sherlock Holmes: 1984–1985 (7), 1985–1986 (6)
  - The Return of Sherlock Holmes: 1986–1987 (7), 1988–1989 (6)
  - The Casebook of Sherlock Holmes: 1991–1992 (6)
  - Sherlock Holmes: The Master Blackmailer: 1992–1993 (1)
  - Sherlock Holmes: The Last Vampire: 1993–1994 (1)
  - Sherlock Holmes: The Eligible Bachelor: 1993–1994 (1)
  - The Memoirs of Sherlock Holmes: 1995–1996 (6)
- Agatha Christie Stories: 1982–1983 (4), 1984–1985 (6)
- Agatha Christie's Marple with Geraldine McEwan and Julia McKenzie: 2005 (4), 2006 (4), 2007 (4), 2009 (4), 2010 (3)
- Agatha Christie's Miss Marple with Joan Hickson: 1985–1986 (2), 1986–1987 (2), 1987–1988 (3), 1988–1989 (2)
- Agatha Christie's Partners in Crime with James Warwick and Francesca Annis: 1984–1985 (5), 1985–1986 (5)
- Agatha Christie's Poirot with David Suchet: 1989–1990 (10), 1990–1991 (9), 1991–1992 (8), 1992–1993 (6), 1993–1994 (6), 1994–1995 (4), 1995–1996 (1), 1996–1997 (1), 1998–1999 (3), 1999–2000 (1), 2009 (2), 2010 (3), 2013 (5)
- Agatha Christie's The Secret Adversary with James Warwick and Francesca Annis: 1986–1987 (1)
- Arthur & George with Martin Clunes and Arsher Ali: 2015 (3)
- Brat Farrar with Mark Greenstreet: 1986–1987 (1)
- Breathless with Catherine Steadman, Zoe Boyle, Natasha Little, Jack Davenport, Iain Glen: 2014 (6)
- Cadfael with Derek Jacobi: 1994–1995 (4), 1996–1997 (1), 1998–1999 (5), 1999–2000 (5)
- Campion with Peter Davison: 1989–1990 (4)
- Case Histories with Jason Isaacs: 2011 (3)
- Cause Célèbre with Helen Mirren: 1988–1989 (1)
- Chandler and Company: 1995–1996 (4)
- Charters and Caldicott: 1985–1986 (1)
- Dalgliesh with Roy Marsden: 1985–1986 (1), 1986–1987 (2), 1987–1988 (1), 1989–1990 (1), 1991–1992 (1), 1993–1994 (1), 1995–1996 (1), 1996–1997 (1), 1998–1999 (1), 1999–2000 (1), 2000–2001 (1)
- Dalgliesh with Martin Shaw: 2004 (1), 2005 (1), 2006 (1)
- A Dark-Adapted Eye with Helena Bonham Carter: 1994–1995 (1)
- The Dark Angel with Peter O'Toole: 1990–1991 (1)
- Death Comes to Pemberley with Matthew Rhys and Anna Maxwell Martin: 2014 (3)
- Dead Gorgeous with Helen McCrory and Fay Ripley: 2003 (1), 2005 (1)
- Deep Secrets with Colin Salmon: 1997–1998 (1)
- Die Kinder (The Children) with Miranda Richardson: 1990–1991 (1)
- Dr. Jekyll and Mr. Hyde with David Hemmings: 1981–1982 (1)
- Dying Day: 1982–1983 (1)
- Endeavour with Shaun Evans: 2012 (1), 2013 (4), 2014 (4), 2016 (4), 2017 (4), 2018 (6), 2019 (4), 2020 (3), 2021 (3), 2022 (3)
- The Escape Artist with David Tennant: 2014 (3)
- Father Brown with Kenneth More: 1982–1983 (4)
- Forgotten with Paul McGann: 2001–2002 (1)
- Foyle's War with Michael Kitchen: 2004 (6), 2005 (4), 2007 (4), 2008 (3), 2009 (2), 2010 (3), 2013 (3)
- Gallowglass with Michael Sheen and Paul Rhys: 1995–1996 (1)
- Game, Set and Match with Ian Holm: 1988–1989 (1)
- Grantchester with James Norton and Robson Green: 2015 (6), 2016 (6), 2017 (6)
- Heat of the Sun with Trevor Eve: 1998–1999 (5)
- Hetty Wainthropp Investigates with Patricia Routledge: 1997–1998 (1), 1998–1999 (1), 1999–2000 (6), 2000–2001 (16), 2003 (3)
- Inspector Alleyn Mysteries with Simon Williams and Patrick Malahide: 1991–1992 (1), 1993–1994 (3), 1994–1995 (2)
- Inspector Lewis with Kevin Whately and Laurence Fox: 2006 (1), 2007 (3), 2008 (3), 2009 (3), 2010 (3), 2011 (3), 2012 (3), 2013 (3), 2014 (3), 2016 (6)
- The Inspector Lynley Mysteries with Nathaniel Parker and Sharon Small: 2001–2002 (2), 2003 (4), 2004 (4), 2005 (8), 2006 (4), 2007 (6), 2008 (6)
- Inspector Morse with John Thaw: 1987–1988 (3), 1988–1989 (3), 1989–1990 (3), 1990–1991 (3), 1991–1992 (3), 1992–1993 (3), 1993–1994 (4), 1994–1995 (3), 1995–1996 (2), 1996–1997 (2), 1998–1999 (3), 1999–2000 (2), 2000–2001 (2), 2001–2002 (3), 2004 (2), 2005 (2), 2006 (2)
- Into the Blue with John Thaw: 1997–1998 (1), 1998–1999 (1)
- Jericho with Robert Lindsay: 2006 (4), 2007 (2)
- Lady Audley's Secret with Lucy Graham: 1999–2000 (1), 2000–2001 (1)
- The Lady Vanishes with Tuppence Middleton: 2013 (1)
- The Life and Crimes of William Palmer with Keith Allen: 1998–1999 (1)
- The Limbo Connection: 1982–1983 (1)
- Lord Peter Wimsey with Edward Petherbridge: 1987–1988 (3)
- Malice Aforethought with Hywel Bennett: 1981–1982 (1)
- Malice Aforethought with Ben Miller: 2005 (1), 2006 (1)
- The Man from the Pru with Jonathan Pryce: 1990–1991 (1)
- Maigret with Michael Gambon: 1992–1993 (6), 1994–1995 (6)
- Melissa with Peter Barkworth: 1982–1983 (1)
- Miss Morison's Ghosts with Wendy Hiller: 1982–1983 (1)
- The Mrs. Bradley Mysteries with Diana Rigg: 2003 (4)
- Mother Love with Diana Rigg: 1990–1991 (1)
- Murder Rooms: The Dark Beginnings of Sherlock Holmes with Ian Richardson: 1999–2000 (2), 2000–2001 (2), 2001–2002 (4)
- My Cousin Rachel with Christopher Guard and Geraldine Chaplin: 1985–1986 (1)
- Oliver's Travels with Alan Bates: 1996–1997 (1), 1998–1999 (1)
- Praying Mantis with Jonathan Pryce: 1984–1985 (1)
- Prime Suspect with Helen Mirren: 1991–1992 (1), 1992–1993 (1), 1993–1994 (1)
- Quiet as a Nun with Maria Aitken: 1982–1983 (1)
- The Racing Game with Mike Gwilym: 1980–1981 (3), 1981–1982 (3)
- Rebecca with Jeremy Brett and Joanna David: 1980–1981 (1)
- Reilly, Ace of Spies with Sam Neill: 1983–1984
- Rumpole of the Bailey with Leo McKern: 1980–1981 (4), 1981–1982 (6), 1984–1985 (6), 1987–1988 (6), 1989–1990 (6), 1992–1993 (6), 1994–1995 (7)
- The Sally Lockhart Mysteries: The Ruby in the Smoke & The Sally Lockhart Mysteries: The Shadow in the North with Billie Piper: 2007 (1), 2008 (1)
- The Sculptress with Pauline Quirke and Caroline Goodall: 1997–1998 (2)
- Second Sight with Clive Owen: 1999–2000 (1), 2000–2001 (4), 2001–2002 (2)
- Sergeant Cribb with Alan Dobie: 1980–1981 (3), 1981–1982 (5), 1982–1983 (5)
- Shades of Darkness with John Duttine: 1983–1984 (7)
- She Fell Among Thieves: 1980–1981 (1)
- Sherlock with Benedict Cumberbatch and Martin Freeman: 2010 (3), 2012 (6), 2014 (3), 2016 (2), 2017 (3)
- Silk with Maxine Peake: 2013 (3)
- Sweeney Todd: 1982–1983 (1)
- Touching Evil with Robson Green: 1998–1999, 1999–2000 (6), 2000–2001 (4), 2001–2002 (6)
- Trial by Fire with Juliet Stevenson: 2000–2001 (1)
- An Unsuitable Job for a Woman with Helen Baxendale: 1999–2000 (4)
- Wallander with Kenneth Branagh: 2009 (3), 2010 (3), 2012 (3), 2016 (3)
- We, the Accused: 1982–1983 (1)
- The Woman in White: 1984–1985 (1)
- The Wyvern Mystery with Derek Jacobi: 2000–2001 (1)
- Zen with Rufus Sewell: 2011 (3)

== American Mystery! Specials ==
The American Mystery! Specials featured three stories set in the United States. They were based on Tony Hillerman's Navajo Tribal Police stories featuring Joe Leaphorn, played by Wes Studi, and Jim Chee, portrayed by Adam Beach:

- Skinwalkers 2002 (1)
- Coyote Waits 2003 (1)
- A Thief of Time 2004 (1)
