= Sharpe's Ransom =

- Short story by Bernard Cornwell
- Country: United Kingdom
- Language: English
- Genre(s): Historical short story

Publication
- Published in: The Daily Mail
- Publication type: Newspaper
- Media type: Print
- Publication date: 1995

Chronology
- Series: Sharpe
Sharpe's Assassin	Sharpe's Devil

"Sharpe's Ransom" is a short story written by historical fiction author Bernard Cornwell. It features Cornwell's fictional hero Richard Sharpe. It was originally written for the British newspaper the Daily Mail, which serialised it during the 1995 Christmas season. In 2003 the Sharpe Appreciation Society combined it with another short story, "Sharpe's Christmas", in the collection Sharpe's Christmas.

== Plot summary ==
"Sharpe's Ransom", which takes place after Sharpe's Waterloo, is set in peacetime, providing a glimpse of Sharpe's life in Normandy with Lucille. Old comrades of Sharpe's enemy, Major Ducos, invade the chateau, believing he possesses some of the emperor's gold he helped General Calvet retrieve (Sharpe's Revenge). Knowing he cannot convince them otherwise, he agrees to take them to where the gold is supposedly hidden. After overpowering his escort with the help of subterfuge, he rallies support from his neighbours, despite their dislike of him, and has them sing a choir in front of his chateau to distract the thieves, enabling him to sneak in through a secret entrance and capture them.
