= Sharpe's Christmas (short story collection) =

2003 short story collection by Bernard Cornwell

- First edition
- Author: Bernard Cornwell
- Language: English
- Series: Richard Sharpe
- Genre: Historical short story collection
- Publisher: The Sharpe Appreciation Society
- Publication date: September 2003
- Publication place: United Kingdom
- Media type: Print (paperback)
- Pages: 104 pp
- ISBN: 0-9722220-1-4
- OCLC: 53796127

Sharpe's Christmas is a short story collection by historical fiction author Bernard Cornwell which he began conceptualising in 1980s. It contains two stories featuring Cornwell's fictional hero Richard Sharpe. It was published by The Sharpe Appreciation Society in 2003 in order to raise funds for The Bernard and Judy Cornwell Foundation. This novel contains two stories that take place at different times, thus in an interview with the author, the book was left unnumbered in the Sharpe's series.

== Contents ==
The two short stories, "Sharpe's Christmas" and "Sharpe's Ransom", contained within this book were originally written for British newspaper the Daily Mail, which serialised them during Christmas seasons of 1994 and 1995 respectively. These were later extended by the author for inclusion in this collection.

=== Sharpe's Christmas ===
Set in 1813, towards the end of the Peninsular War, chronologically this story falls after Sharpe's Regiment.

=== Sharpe's Ransom ===
Set in peacetime after Sharpe's Waterloo this story providing a glimpse of Sharpe's life in Normandy with Lucille.
