= Benjamin Huger =

Benjamin Huger is the name of several prominent men from South Carolina:

- Benjamin Huger (American Revolution) (1746–1779), militia officer killed near Charleston
- Benjamin Huger (politician) (1768–1823), served in state and federal legislatures
- Benjamin Huger (Confederate general) (1805–1877), Civil War Confederate general, veteran of the Mexican–American War
