= Sharpe's Siege =

1987 historical novel by Bernard Cornwell

- First edition
- Author: Bernard Cornwell
- Language: English
- Series: Richard Sharpe
- Genre: Historical novel
- Publisher: Collins
- Publication date: 1987
- Publication place: United Kingdom
- Media type: Print (hardback and paperback) and audiobook
- Pages: 352
- ISBN: 0-00-221431-8
- Preceded by: "Sharpe's Christmas"
- Followed by: Sharpe's Revenge

Sharpe's Siege is the eighteenth historical novel in the Richard Sharpe series by Bernard Cornwell, first published in 1987. The story is set on the Atlantic coast of France in the Napoleonic Wars during the British Invasion of France in 1814.

== Plot ==
A combined naval and infantry force is sent 100 miles up the coast from the British foothold in France to capture a seemingly weakly defended fortress. Major Richard Sharpe is given command of the land forces, primarily two rifle companies, one of them led by his friend, Captain William Frederickson. Colonel Wigram and Royal Navy Captain Horace Bampfylde, the naval commander, also want to incite a monarchist rebellion in Bordeaux, only 25 miles away, based on rumours of unrest. However, army Colonel Elphinstone dismisses the rumours. He informs Sharpe in private that the goal is to capture three dozen chasse-marées sheltering under the fortress's guns to use to construct a boat bridge (over the Adour River) and orders Sharpe to avoid any advance on Bordeaux. The Comte de Maquerre, a member of the Chasseurs Britanniques, joins the expedition at the last minute. Sharpe fears his wife Jane is sick with fever, as she has been regularly visiting his good friend Lieutenant Colonel Hogan, who is dying of it.

Bampfylde changes plans without warning, ordering Sharpe to set up an ambush on the road to Bordeaux, while he reserves the supposedly easy capture of the fortress for himself and his Marines. Sharpe, however, spots an ambush by American sailors under the command of American privateer Cornelius Killick. Sharpe then gains entry to the fortress by a ruse, accompanied by Regimental Sergeant Major Harper and Captain Frederickson; his men follow and defeat the stronger-than-anticipated garrison. They also capture some of the Americans, including Killick. Bampfylde decides to hang the Americans as pirates, despite Killick presenting him his letter of marque, but Sharpe releases the Americans after obtaining Killick's oath not to fight the British. Sharpe then marches inland with a company of Royal Marines led by Captain Palmer to set up an ambush, while Bampfylde writes an official report wherein he claims all of the glory and does not mention Sharpe at all.

Sharpe ambushes a French column, using surprise to rout an inexperienced force three or four times larger than his own. As the French regroup, he retreats back to the fortress. There, de Maquerre claims Bordeaux has risen in open rebellion and insists that Sharpe march his men there to support it, showing him a document make him a "Major General" in the "Royalist Army". Sharpe refuses, distrusting him, but de Maquerre reaches the fortress first and informs Bampfylde that Sharpe's force has been destroyed, that Sharpe himself has been captured, and that a strong French force is rapidly approaching. De Maquerre is an agent of French spymaster Major Pierre Ducos. Bampfylde strips the fortress of supplies, spikes the guns, damages the defences and blows up the main arsenal. He then sails away.

Hours later, Sharpe returns to a partially ruined and deserted fortress. Ducos, having arranged for his longtime nemesis Sharpe to be stranded, orders General Calvet and his demi-brigade to capture the fortress. Killick, who is reluctantly working for Ducos, warns Sharpe beforehand and gives him a hint about piles of burned oyster shells (quicklime) nearby. Sharpe's men are outnumbered ten-to-one and are short of ammunition, but manage to hold off several assaults, dumping the quicklime onto their enemies, blinding them. Ducos orders Killick to break his oath and use his ship to bombard the fortress in coordination with another attack. Sharpe has an idea; he meets secretly with Killick to arrange an escape in exchange for releasing Killick from his oath. The next morning, Sharpe surrenders to him. Calvet rejects the surrender and personally leads an attack, but Sharpe fights a delaying action, and he and his men manage to board the American privateer. Killick lands Sharpe close to British lines.

Sharpe reaches the newly completed floating bridge, exposes Bampfylde as a liar, and kills de Maquerre. To his relief, he finds out Jane only had a cold. However, Hogan has died.

== Characters ==
- Richard Sharpe - Major of the South Essex, commander of the Light Company
- Patrick Harper - The Irish RSM of the South Essex, Sharpe's friend
- William Frederickson - Captain of the 60th Royal Americans and Sharpe's ally
- Horace Bampfylde - Junior Post-captain in the Royal Navy, captain of HMS Vengeance
- Cornelius Killick - American Privateer and captain of the schooner Thuella
- Neil Palmer - Bampfylde's Captain of Marines
- Pierre Ducos - French intelligence officer and Sharpe's bitter enemy
- Jean-Baptiste Calvet - General of the French forces near the Fortress
- Comte de Maquerre - French nobleman who claims loyalty to the British and the House of Bourbon, but is secretly a spy for Ducos

== Television adaptation ==
The novel was adapted for the fourth season of the Sharpe television series under the same title. The adaptation gave Maquerre a sister, Catherine, who remains behind at the fort when it is captured by the British and serves as a secondary love interest for Sharpe. The nautical element is removed, making Bampfylde the new commanding officer of the Prince of Wales' Own Volunteers and omitting Killick altogether. Hogan was replaced with Major-General Ross, a character created for the series, and both he and Sharpe's wife Jane suffer from fever. The quinine that can cure her is a subplot for Sharpe. Ducos poses as the mayor of Bordeaux, whereas in the novel a separate character (a French officer named Jean Favier) poses as the mayor's representative, and Maquerre's death is altered, with him remaining with the French and being shot from a distance by Hagman. Bampfylde is arrested for deserting his post.
