= Adrados =

- Municipality
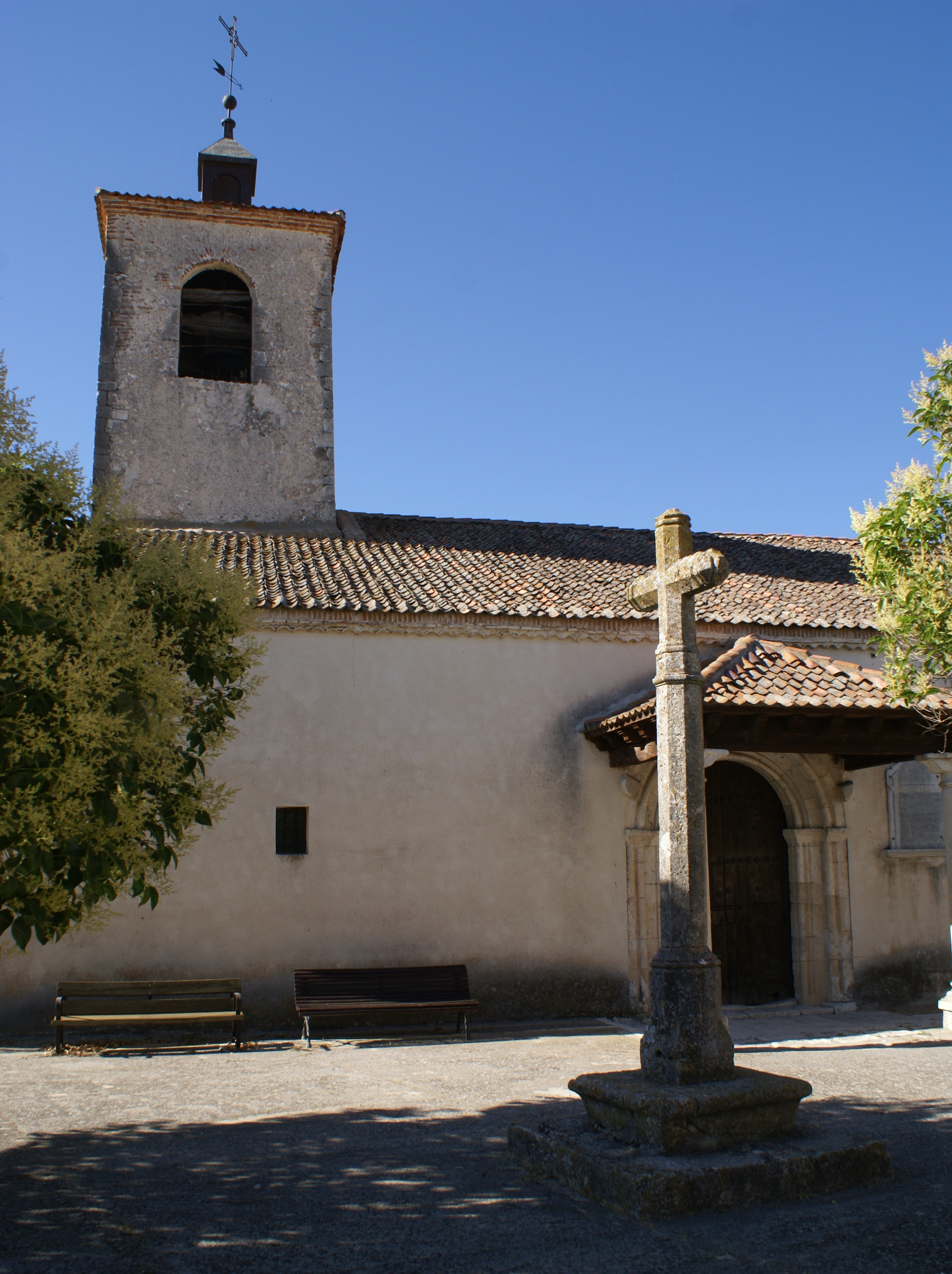

- Flag Coat of arms

- Location in Spain. Adrados (Spain)
- Coordinates: 41°22′06″N 4°06′46″W
- Country: Spain
- Autonomous community: Castile and León
- Province: Segovia
- Municipality: Adrados

Area
  - Total: 19.19 km^{2} (7.41 sq mi)
- Elevation: 879 m (2,884 ft)

Population (2025-01-01)
  - Total: 113
  - Density: 5.89/km^{2} (15.3/sq mi)
- Time zone: UTC+1 (CET)
  - Summer (DST): UTC+2 (CEST)
- Website: Official website

Adrados is a municipality located in the province of Segovia, Castile and León, Spain. According to the 2004 census (INE), the municipality had a population of 176 inhabitants.

== In fiction ==
Adrados is the main setting for Bernard Cornwell's historical novel Sharpes Enemy.
