= Redcoat (novel) =

1987 novel

- Author: Bernard Cornwell
- Language: English
- Genre: Gistorical war
- Publisher: Michael Joseph
- Publication date: 1987
- Publication place: United Kingdom
- Media type: Print

Redcoat is a 1987 historical novel by the British author Bernard Cornwell. It takes place during the American War of Independence at the time of the Philadelphia campaign of 1777 and 1778. The title refers to the Red coat worn by the British Army. It was a stand-alone novel rather than the series such as the Richard Sharpe novels or Starbuck Chronicles which the author is best known for.

== Bibliography ==
- Stringer, Jennny (ed.) The Oxford Companion to Twentieth-Century Literature in English. : Oxford University Press, 1996.
- Woods, Tim (ed.) Who's Who of Twentieth Century Novelists. Taylor & Francis, 2008.
