= Hugger =

Hugger is a surname. Notable people with the surname include:

- Jan Hugger (born 1998), German racing cyclist
- Jon Hugger (born 1977), American wrestler
- Svend Hugger (1925–2017), Danish footballer

== See also ==
- Huger
