= Senator Huger (disambiguation) =

Daniel Elliott Huger (1779–1854) was a U.S. Senator from South Carolina. Senator Huger may also refer to:

- Benjamin Huger (politician) (1768–1823), South Carolina State Senate
- Francis Kinloch Huger (1773–1855), South Carolina State Senate
