= Leonora Sansay =

American novelist

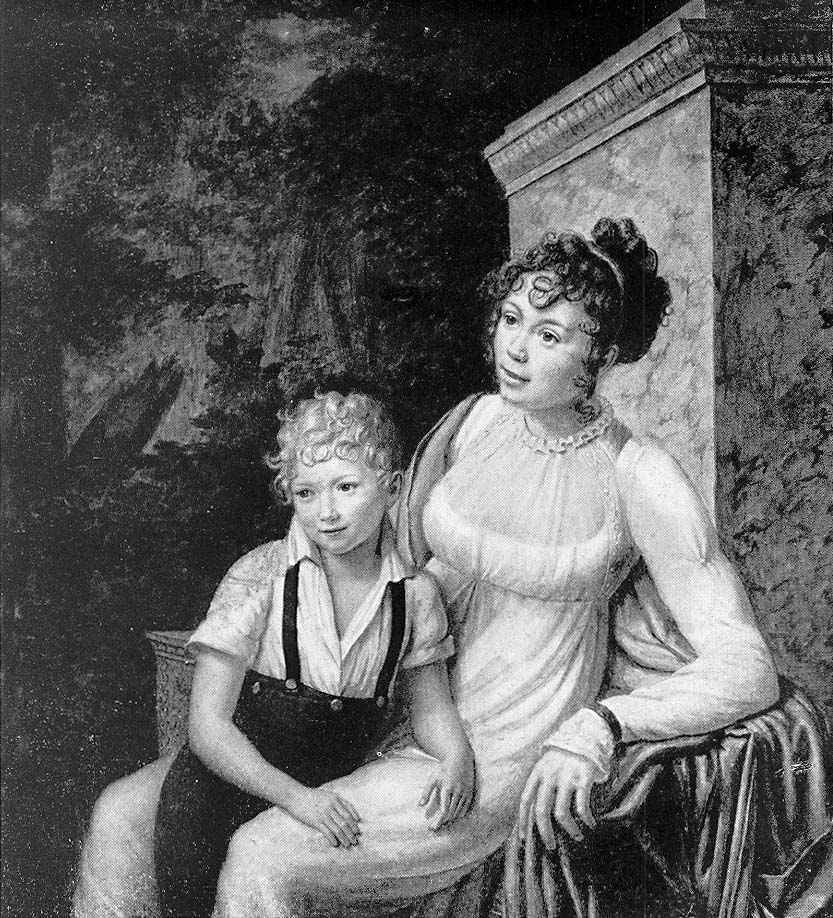
Mother and son (c. 1800), by Vanderlyn

Leonora Sansay (December 11, 1773 – interred November 12, 1821) was an American novelist. She was the author of Secret History; or, The Horrors of St. Domingo, in a Series of Letters Written by a Lady at Cape Francois to Col. Burr, late Vice-President of the United States, Principally During the Command of General Rochambeau (Philadelphia, 1808) and Laura (Philadelphia, 1809), and possibly three other novels: Zelica: The Creole (London, 1820); The Scarlet Handkerchief (London, 1823); and The Stranger in Mexico (not extant).

== Biography ==
She was born Honora Davern in Philadelphia on December 11, 1773, to Rosa and William Davern, the latter of whom died at sea a few weeks after her birth, probably in January 1774. On Valentine's Day 1779, her mother married a Philadelphia innkeeper named William Hassel (sometimes Hassal); Sansay's stepfather maintained Hassal's Tavern (or The Half Moon — a generic name for an English pub), which was located across from the State House (Independence Hall), where local politicians and members of Congress often met informally.

Rosa and William Hassel had two children of their own, Sansay's half-siblings, Mary (born November 12, 1781) and William (born December 24, 1784). Incidentally, it was Mary who has often been mistakenly credited with the authorship of Secret History and Laura (the mistake derives from the name of the author-character of Secret History, also named Mary and a handwritten note on the flyleaf of a copy in the possession of the Library Company of Philadelphia).

Sansay's mother was buried November 4, 1790 and her stepfather was buried on September 4, 1793. Both were buried in the New Chapel Burying Ground of St. Mary's Church. (Jennifer Van Bergen, "Reconstructing Leonora," https://www.academia.edu/41743274/Reconstructing_Leonora_Sansay.)

At some point in the mid- to late 1790s (she shows up in the Philadelphia City Directory for 1796 as "Eleonora Hassel, Gentlewoman"), Sansay met Aaron Burr, who became her friend and mentor. (Sansay stated that she met him after the death of her fiancé, who had left a letter leaving her and their unborn child "to his protection.") One researcher, Steven Saunders, speculates that Sansay's fiancé ["Belfield" in Laura] might have been John Rush, first child of Dr. Benjamin and Julia Rush. John studied to become a doctor like his father but was removed from Princeton and became an assistant to his father (1792), challenged numerous men to duels (1797-1807), served in the Navy (1798-1808), attempted suicide multiple times, was relieved of duty and declared insane by a doctor with the U. S. Naval Hospital in New Orleans (December 1808). On February 10, 1810, he was admitted to Pennsylvania Hospital, listed as a lunatic, where he lived for the next 27 years. He died August 9, 1837. (Unpublished "Timeline of Leonora and John Rush" by Steven Saunders (in possession of Jennifer Van Bergen), incorporating information from "Benjamin Rush and His Insane Son" by Eric Carlson and Jeffrey Wollock, https://www.researchgate.net/profile/Jeffrey-Wollock/publication/22053116_Benjamin_Rush_and_his_insane_son/links/55f178b408aef559dc4720b5/Benjamin-Rush-and-his-insane-son.pdf.)

Some scholars believe Burr and Sansay were lovers, but this is contested by Van Bergen. Burr continued to play an important role in Sansay's life until at least 1812 (and possibly as late as 1817).

Leonora writes in Secret History that Burr convinced her to marry Louis Sansay (St. Louis), then a New York merchant having fled his plantation in Saint-Domingue (now Haïti), a French colony subject to a massive slave uprising that would ultimately end with the declaration of Haitian Independence in 1804. In early 1802, Louis Sansay made plans to return to Haiti to reclaim his property. He sent Leonora to visit Burr in Washington to obtain letters of recommendation and a passport for Louis. Corroborating the purpose of Leonora's visit, Burr also wrote to his cousin, Pierpont Edwards:

Madame Sansay will sail with her husband for St. Domingo (I believe the Cape) in a few Days -- She is the Lady of whom you may have heard me speak under the Name of Leonora, married about two years ago to Mr. Sansay a reputable french Merch[an]t. formerly of that Island but for some Years past resident of N York - I pray you to give Made. S. a very Warm letter of introduction to General Rochambeau [the French Commander at Haiti] -- You may speak very highly of her talents, her acquirements and her accomplishments - She speaks & writes french & has more sense & information than all the women to be found in St. Dom. -- Enclose the letter to her and direct as underneath -- leave open your letter to Rochambeaud & pray let it be written and signed in a legible hand.

Louis Sansay wrote Burr several letters during the time Leonora stayed in Washington with Burr. In these letters, Louis asked that, "considering the affection and the attachment that you always have attested for [Leonora]", Burr would "employ yourself for us ... to obtain for me at the expense of the French government my passage [to Haiti] and that of my wife, my daughter and of my two servants by making him see that I am without means." Louis thanked Burr for "all the kindnesses that you were willing to show for her and for me" and informed Burr that he was taking Leonora with him to Haiti (despite the dangers there), that he hoped Burr would urge her to return to New York as soon as possible to set sail with Louis, "as it is impossible for me to be happy without her possession very near." (Original letters are in French.)

Each subsequent letter after Louis' first one manifested increasing anxiety on his part about Leonora. Finally, on April 2, Louis wrote Burr with "horrible anxiety" about Leonora, saying it had been nine days and he had received only one letter from her, claiming he feared she was ill, but contradicting himself by charging her with "flightiness and fickleness" and claiming "I tremble that her intention is to abandon me." Declaring he would "sacrifice even my life rather than to see her in the possession of another," Louis begged Burr "to reassure my heart, which is broken with pain," "to urge her to come back as promptly as possible." Trying to convince Burr that he only had "her happiness and mine" at heart, Louis promised to bestow $12,000 upon her (even though in his 3/22 letter, he had stated that "after all the misfortunes that I endured, sir, recently and my resources being almost exhausted") if Burr could manage to get her to go to Haiti with him.

Leonora returned to Louis and the couple embarked for Haiti in late May or early June. From Haiti, Sansay continued corresponding with Burr; these letters form the basis for Sansay's first book, Secret History. They describe the final days of French rule on the island.

After departing Haiti, Leonora and Louis lived for a time in Cuba. But when his "intolerable and groundless jealousy" grew to the point where "[i]n every man that approached me he saw a rival" and when he "came home [one night] in a transport of fury, dragged me from my bed, said it was his intention to destroy me, and swore that he would render me horrible by rubbing aqua-fortis [nitric acid] in my face," Leonora left him, escaping in the dark of night to a remote village 12 miles away.

Eventually Sansay made her way to Jamaica and back to Philadelphia. She next played a part in Burr's alleged 1806 conspiracy, for which he was indicted (and acquitted) for high misdemeanor and treason in 1807. Sansay appears in a March 1, 1808 news item in The Richmond Enquirer under one of her pseudonyms, Madame D'Auvergne, an apparent francization of her birth name (Davern). (See Thomas Abernethy, Burr Conspiracy (1954), p. 270 - Robert T. Spence testified he had sailed from Philadelphia to New Orleans "with Bollman, Alexander, and a Madame D'Auvergne, alias Nora Haskel"]. See also Davis, Private Journal of AB, Mrs. --- to Burr, 11-6-1808, 1:78-79 - "Just before I left New-Orleans I received a present of elegant medals from my friend in Mexico." Architect Benjamin Latrobe also noted Leonora's presence in New Orleans: Benjamin H. Latrobe, The Correspondence and Miscellaneous Papers of Benjamin Henry Latrobe, John C. Van Horne and Lee W. Formwalt, eds., Papers Of Benjamin Henry Latrobe Series, Series 4, 1805-1810. (New Haven, 1987), 2:259 - He wrote to Lewis DeMun in New Orleans: "If you see M. D'Avergne [sic], say every thing that the sincerest respect would prompt.")

After the Burr trial, Sansay returned again to Philadelphia and wrote and published Secret History; or, The Horrors of St. Domingo, in a Series of Letters Written by a Lady at Cape Francois to Col. Burr, late Vice-President of the United States, Principally During the Command of General Rochambeau. The following year, Sansay's Laura appeared in print from the same press, Bradford & Inskeep. She set up a flower manufacturing business with the help of Eric Bollman.

=== Later life ===
Sansay makes periodic appearances in Burr's correspondence, though the vast majority of these letters have been lost. Burr shared her letters with Jeremy Bentham while in exile in Europe after his acquittal.

Further references to Leonora may be found under the names "Clara" and "Mme. D'Auvergne" in Burr's "Private Journal" at: 1:30 [Eric Bollman to AB, 8-11-1808]; 1:78 [Mrs. --- to Burr <Phila.>, 11-6-1808](also in Drexler, pp. 231–32); 1:84-85 [Bollman to AB, 11-12/1808, corroborates Mrs. --- 11-6 letter]; 1:146 [Burr journal entry, 1-20-1809]; 1:149 [Burr journal entry, 2-1-1809; Davis footnote identifying Clara as "Madame D'Auvergne, but better known as Leonora Sansay, author of the Horrors of St. Domingo"]; 1:170 [AB to Jeremy Bentham, 1-23-1809]; 1:242 [Theodosia Burr Alston to AB, 5-31-1809]; 2:440-46 [Mrs. L****** to AB (Phila.), 7-29-1812 - refers to Bollman](also in Drexler, pp. 232–35, two pages omitted).

More references are in M.L. Davis Memoirs of AB: 2:175 [Mrs. ****** to AB, 2-9-1802 - 2 months before her departure for Haiti; not ascertained to be from LS]; 2:323 [AB to TBA, 7-10-1804 - letters of Clara sometimes "L" - shortly before Burr's duel]; 2:326 [AB to Joseph Alston, 7-10-1804, "Madame Sansay, too well known under the name of Leonora, has claims on my recollection."]. See also Charles Burdett, Margaret Moncrieffe: The First Love of Aaron Burr (1860), pp. 428–37, reprinted in Michael J. Drexler's edition of Secret History and Laura, pp. 223–31. And Mary-Jo Kline, Political Correspondence & Public Papers of Aaron Burr (1983) 2:70, AB to Pierpont Edwards, 3-20-1802.

Maxwell Struthers Burt wrote in Philadelphia: Holy Experiment (1947) that Sansay was "mysterious and will remain mysterious," adding "Discreet historians have abandoned her in despair on the principles that if you ignore something it won't bite you" (p. 236).

Two other novels may be attributed to Sansay: Zelica, the Creole (1820) and The Scarlet Handkerchief (1823). Both were published in London, but indicate that they were transmitted from America. The flyleaf for "Zelica, the Creole" advertises the author's other works as follows: "In the press, by the same author, The Scarlet Handkerchief, 3 vols. The Stranger in Mexico, 3 vols. Which, with Zelica, the Creole, now published, from a Series of Novels that have been transmitted to the Publisher from America" Likewise, The Scarlet Handkerchief credits "An American, also the author of Zelica, the Creole" as its author. The third novel, A Stranger in Mexico, is promoted, though no copies have been found.

According to The Scarlet Handkerchief, the main character, Sophia, travels to London in the hopes of obtaining fame through publication of her novels. She counted on "Mr. Charlton" upon whose friendship she "had claims." She says she "had a right to count [on him]; and from him I received my first disappointment." (Vol. II, p, 37.) Mr. Charlton may have been Eric Bollman, who had resided near Sansay circa 1809-12 in Hamilton, Pennsylvania outside Philadelphia, where had attempted various business adventures and assisted her with her flower manufacturing business. He moved to London in 1814, where he attempted further business adventures and wrote articles on precious metals and the economy. ("The Business Activities of Eric Bollmann," Bulletin of the Business Historical Society, vol. 17, No. 5 (Nov., 1943), pp. 81-91, https://www.jstor.org/stable/3110871.)

In the novel, Charlton scolds Sophia for having come to London, calling her action: "an act of madness." (Vol. II, p. 20.) "Always impetuous -- always unreasonable," he says, "there is no sooner a new idea awakened in that strangely-organized brain than you seize on it . . ." (Id. at 24.) Sophia ultimately tells a friend: "My work, you must remember, was a first essay, and was entrusted to one disposed to throw all possible discouragement in my way to prevent my remaining in Europe. Mr. Charlton, who could not foresee the brilliant success I have obtained, was afraid that any partial degree of that success would fix me near him, and thus keep for ever before his eyes a person whose claims on him he could not deny, though not at all disposed to acknowledge them." (Vol. III, pp. 226-27.)

The rest of The Scarlet Handkerchief finds Sophia largely in France under the care of an elderly woman: Madame D'Ormesson, who "embodies the values of propriety and adherence to social norms, especially regarding the behavior of young ladies in French society. She keeps the ladies away from Parisian 'amusements' and confines their outings to the countryside." (AI generated summary of The Scarlet Handkerchief, via researcher and software engineer, Maxim Rud, London, October 2024.)

Ultimately, Sophia obtains the publication of her novel through the offices of her friend, Cecelia, the Countess of Rosendale. (Vol. III, pp. 186, 198.)

In the third volume of The Scarlet Handerchief, the author increasingly dwells on the themes of abandonment and love. Sansay conveys Sophia's regrets, sorrows, and the difficulties of her situation. With barely a "Napoleon" left to her name, Sophia askss: "[I]s there any thing so forlorn as a female who has none to direct, support, or console her?" (Vol. III, p. 158.) She questions whether "we shall still love, and be loved, if deserted by mankind?" (Vol. III, p. 171.) Sansay projects her darkest thoughts onto the impetuous younger version of herself, Julia, who, finding herself betrayed by "the object of her love" ultimately "plunged [herself] into the Seine." (Vol. III, p 220.)

While at the end of the novel, Sophia becomes the wife of "Lord Edgeville," Sansay's fate apparently was not as fortunate. She died several months after the publication of Zelica: The Creole," but approximately 18 months before The Scarlet Handkerchief was published. The publisher of Zelica went bankrupt and the publication of Scarlet Handkerchief was undertaken by another publisher.

Sansay was buried one month before her 48th birthday in an unmarked grave at St. Mary's Church on November 12, 1821, in the Parish of Newent, County of Gloucester. (Recorded in the Church of England Burials.)

== Works ==
- Secret History; or, The Horrors of St. Domingo (Philadelphia, 1808)
- Laura (Philadelphia, 1809)
- Zelica, the Creole (London, 1820)
- The Scarlet Handkerchief (London, 1823)
- The Stranger in Mexico (not extant)
