= Sharpe's Storm =

2025 historical novel by Bernard Cornwell

- Author: Bernard Cornwell
- Language: English
- Series: Richard Sharpe stories
- Genre: Historical novels
- Publisher: HarperCollins
- Publication date: 2025
- Publication place: United Kingdom
- Media type: Print
- Preceded by: Sharpe's Regiment (chronological); Sharpe's Command (publication)
- Followed by: "Sharpe's Christmas" (chronological)

Sharpe's Storm is a historical novel in the Richard Sharpe series by Bernard Cornwell, first published in 2025. The story depicts the invasion of southwestern France by Lord Wellington.

== Plot summary ==
It is November 1813. Napoleon is busy fending off the Prussians and Russians after his disastrous 1812 Russian campaign. Marshal Soult occupies the French fortress city of Bayonne, near the border with Spain, with a force that is a bit larger than Wellesley's invading Anglo-Portuguese-Spanish army, though the latter consists of veterans of the Peninsular War.

Major Richard Sharpe holds onto the slim hope that he will be promoted and given command of the seriously understrength Prince of Wales's Own Volunteers (formerly the South Essex), but Wellington apologetically informs him that he is powerless to influence the decision of Horse Guards back in London. Meanwhile, an arrogant but inexperienced Lieutenant Colonel Sir Nathanial Peacock arrives to take over the 71st, left leaderless by the death of its commander in battle.

Major General Edward Barnes orders Sharpe to mount a morning diversionary attack across one of the many rivers blocking Wellesley's advance, while the main assault is assigned to the 71st. Sharpe disobeys and assails the French rear, targeting the artillery facing the main attack. He succeeds in capturing the cannons and disrupting the French, resulting in very light casualties for the allies. Peacock, whose men do not see any fighting after he falls off his horse and claims to have fractured his leg, protests to Wellington about Sharpe's flagrant disregard of orders, but is ignored.

Wellington has a new task for Sharpe. He is reunited with an old friend: Joel Chase, the Royal Navy captain who brought him from India back to Europe, just in time to fight in the Battle of Trafalgar (Sharpe's Trafalgar), though Chase is now a rear admiral. Chase and his flag captain, Crittenden, are ashore to examine how pontoon bridges are constructed. Chase confides to Sharpe that Wellington wants the Royal Navy to build a very long bridge across the seaward side of the estuary on which Bayonne is situated. The river Adour flows into the city from the east, and the terrain to the east is unsuitable for a contested river crossing. Wellington does not have enough men to take the heavily fortified city, so he has chosen to use a pontoon bridge to send his soldiers north of Bayonne to outflank and surround the city. Sharpe, at the personal request of Chase, is assigned to guide and protect the party, which includes Petty Officer Clouter, another of Sharpe's friends. This proves a difficult task, as Chase is irresistibly drawn to the sound of gunfire and artillery, and Sharpe finds himself in the thick of fighting several times.

Meanwhile, Wellington is forced to divide his force in half during his advance, one half on each side of the river Nive. When one of the two vital pontoon bridges across the river breaks apart, Soult launches a heavy attack on the force on the west side of the river. Peacock, in his first battle, panics and orders the 71st to retreat from its vital position, then flees. Sharpe countermands his order and manages to hold the line until reinforcements arrive. Peacock is sent home in disgrace. (Cornwell states in his historical notes that Peacock was a real officer who behaved in this manner and was cashiered from the army.)

Sharpe also has a different sort of problem. His wife Jane has left by ship without informing him or leaving a message. He worries that she has abandoned him, but as it turns out, she was merely required to act as one of the chaperones for a wayward young Spanish noblewoman being returned to her father.

For his next mission, Sharpe and some of his men are sent by ship to the north of Bayonne on a secret night reconnaissance to see if the ground is capable of anchoring the pontoon bridge Wellington wants. Sharpe takes along some Spanish deserters, supposedly to dig in the dirt to see if it is strong enough to hold. However, he has another role for them. Despite his best attempts, Sharpe and his party are spotted by the French. Sharpe gives the Spanish permission to attack and loot a farmhouse held by the enemy. A couple of the Spaniards are killed. Sharpe leaves their bodies behind, while being careful to take any British casualties back with him. As a result, the French are fooled into believing that the raid was by a roving Spanish band. Wellington is pleased by the success of the ruse. (At this point, the story ends before the campaign reaches a resolution; Cornwell explains that he had previously written that Sharpe was elsewhere, in "Sharpe's Christmas".)
