= Sharpe's Waterloo =

1990 historical novel by Bernard Cornwell

- First edition cover
- Author: Bernard Cornwell
- Series: Richard Sharpe
- Genre: Historical novels
- Publisher: Collins
- Publication date: 1 February 1990
- Publication place: United Kingdom
- Media type: Print (hardback and paperback) and audio-CD
- Pages: 416 pp (first edition, hardback)
- ISBN: 0-00-223643-5 (first edition, hardback)
- OCLC: 32926187
- Dewey Decimal: 823/.914 20
- LC Class: PR6053.O75 S57 1990a
- Preceded by: Sharpe's Revenge
- Followed by: Sharpe's Ransom

Sharpe's Waterloo is a historical novel in the Richard Sharpe series by Bernard Cornwell. Originally published in 1990 under the title Waterloo, it is the eleventh novel of the Sharpe series and the twentieth novel in chronological order. Cornwell stated that he intended to end the series here, but later changed his mind.

== Plot summary ==
Napoleon having escaped from Elba, Richard Sharpe leaves his farm in Normandy to rejoin the British Army, accompanied by his lover Lucille. He is hired by the Prince of Orange as part of his staff and appointed a lieutenant colonel. Sharpe's friend Patrick Harper, despite being a civilian who has ostensibly come to Belgium to trade in horses, resumes his old place at Sharpe's side.

=== The First Day: 15 June 1815 ===
While patrolling the roads connecting the Anglo-Dutch and Prussian forces, Sharpe sees a large unit of Napoleon's Army of the North crossing the border from France, revealing that Napoleon does not intend to maneuver around the flank of the allied armies via Mons, as the Duke of Wellington expects, but instead to drive into the gap between the British and Prussian armies and defeat them in detail. Sharpe sends an urgent message to General Dornberg, while he stays behind to continue observing the French. Unfortunately, Dornberg thinks it is a French ruse and tears it up.

Later that day, after the French have entered Charleroi, Sharpe returns to the Prince of Orange's headquarters and is aghast to find that the army is ignorant of the French invasion. The Prince's Chief of Staff, Baron Rebecque, despatches a messenger to retrieve the Prince from Brussels, while Sharpe carries orders to the troops nearest to the crossroads at Quatre Bras, commanded by Prince Bernhard Carl of Saxe-Weimar-Eisenach. Although the French are checked as evening falls, Sharpe knows they will launch a much stronger attack in the morning, and rides to Brussels to warn Wellington.

Sharpe barges into the Duchess of Richmond's ball and informs Wellington. Wellington is dismayed at being "humbugged" by Napoleon. At the ball, Sharpe is outraged to encounter Lord John Rossendale, the lover of his estranged wife Jane. Rossendale flees, but Sharpe catches him in full view of the guests. He insults Rossendale, offers to settle matters with a duel, and demands the return of the money Jane stole from him. Rossendale, knowing full well that he would lose a duel with Sharpe, meekly acquiesces, but Jane obliquely encourages him to use the impending battle as a cover to kill Sharpe.

=== The Second Day: 16 June 1815 ===
At Quatre Bras, a Belgian unit brought up to reinforce Saxe-Weimar breaks and runs as soon as the first French column appears (the Belgians having recently been French allies). The Prince of Orange twice attempts to lead a charge of his Dutch-Belgian cavalry against an opposing force of French lancers, but his men refuse to follow him.

Wellington arrives at Quatre Bras in time to see the Belgian troops fleeing, and details General Picton to deploy the British reinforcements, while Wellington rides east to confer with the Prussians. The Prince of Orange, humiliated by his own troops' poor performance, becomes outraged at Picton deploying brigades from I Corps, of which the Prince is the nominal commander, without consulting him. The Prince orders General Halkett's brigade to form line and advance. The Prince disregards Sharpe's warning that the French cavalry are lurking nearby and will massacre any infantry in line, and dismisses Sharpe from his staff when Sharpe refuses to deliver the orders to Halkett.

The 69th Regiment obeys and is all but wiped out by cavalry led by General Kellermann. Sharpe and Harper rush to the side of their old regiment, the Prince of Wales' Own Volunteers, and save some of them by urging them to flee to the safety of a forest. The brigade takes heavy casualties, and the French cavalry capture the 69th's King's Colour. Although more reinforcements arrive in time to check the French advance, Sharpe rages at the needless loss of life caused by the Prince.

=== The Third Day: 17 June 1815 ===
Rebecque attempts to mend fences between Sharpe and the Prince of Orange, saying the Prince needs Sharpe at his side more than ever now that the entire army knows he blundered. As much as he despises the Prince, Sharpe makes a token apology for his "rudeness," not wanting to lose his colonel's pay.

Sharpe learns that the Prussians are retreating after their defeat at Ligny. The British retreat to a defensive position chosen by Wellington: the ridge of Mont St. Jean, just south of the village of Waterloo. While they are preparing to ride away, Sharpe and Harper glimpse across the field and see Napoleon himself astride a horse.

During the confusion of the retreat from Quatre Bras, Lord John Rossendale becomes separated from the Earl of Uxbridge's staff, and is cornered alone in the woods by Sharpe. Rossendale aims a pistol at Sharpe, but lacks the nerve to pull the trigger, and Sharpe disarms him easily. Sharpe says Rossendale is welcome to Jane, but he makes Rossendale write a promissory note for his stolen money. Sharpe mockingly drops a length of rope into Rossendale's lap, saying that Rossendale has "bought" Jane according to an old English custom.

=== The Fourth Day: 18 June 1815 ===
Wellington deploys his forces on the ridge south of Waterloo, trusting Prussian commander Field Marshal Blücher's assurance he will march to his aid if he makes a stand. Unknown to him, General Gneisenau, Blücher's chief of staff, does not trust Wellington and secretly mismanages the Prussians' march to slow it down as much as possible.

The Prince of Orange posts Sharpe on the British right to watch for a French flanking attack. Sharpe, however, is certain that Napoleon is so confident of victory that he will instead launch a frontal attack in overwhelming force. Although both armies assemble well before dawn, Napoleon does not commence his attack until close to 11:00 a.m.

Sharpe and Harper, watching the French advance, are drawn into the defence of Hougoumont, and witness Colonel Macdonell's heroic closing of the gates after some Frenchmen get in. During a lull in the fighting, Sharpe offers his assistance, and Macdonell asks him to fetch a wagonload of ammunition.

The Prince of Orange is humiliated further when, again, the Dutch-Belgian troops under his command refuse to advance. Believing that the farm of La Haye Sainte is about to fall to the enemy, the Prince quickly orders a Hanoverian regiment to advance in line, again ignoring one of his officers' warning that he spotted some French cavalry nearby. Again, the allied infantry are slaughtered.

With Hogoumont under siege on Wellington's right, Napoleon believes (incorrectly) that Wellington will weaken his line to deploy reinforcements there, so he orders D'Erlon's infantry corps to assault the British center.

Rossendale, desperate to regain his honor in battle after being humiliated by Sharpe, joins the charge of the British heavy cavalry in sweeping D'Erlon's infantry from the ridge. Rossendale fights bravely, but is swept along with the ill-disciplined English cavalry as they cross the field to the French artillery park. By the time French lancers appear, the Englishmen's horses are exhausted, and they are easily slaughtered. Rossendale is struck from behind by a lance to the spine, blinded by a sword slash to the face, and knocked off his horse.

Sharpe, outraged to learn that the Prince has repeated his mistake and caused yet more needless deaths, gives the Prince the V sign and rides away. He briefly considers riding back to Brussels and collecting Lucille, but changes his mind when Marshal Ney, mistaking movement behind the British ridge as a sign of wavering, unleashes the French cavalry at the ridge, where they encounter British infantry in square. The French stubbornly make fruitless attacks on the squares, though this makes the infantry prime targets for the French artillery, which exact a dreadful toll.

The Prince, for the third time, causes his men (this time from the King's German Legion) to be slaughtered by ordering them forward in line in the proximity of cavalry. Lieutenant Doggett calls the Prince "a silk stocking full of shit," (quoting Harper) and rides off to find Sharpe. Fearing more men will die if the Prince remains in command, Sharpe attempts to kill him under cover of the fighting, but only hits him in the shoulder, though this forces the Prince to retire from the field.

As La Haye Sainte falls and with the French skirmishers and cannon slowly grinding down the British, Colonel Ford, the Prince of Wales' Own Volunteers inexperienced commander, is frightened, confused and indecisive when Napoleon, mistakenly believing the British are wavering, sends forward four massive columns of his best, most renowned troops, the Imperial Guard, to strike the decisive blow. Two columns are stalled by stiff resistance, Wellington personally orders the volleys that rout the third column, and Sharpe rallies his old regiment and plays a major role in repulsing the last one. Witnessing this, Wellington gives Sharpe official command of the regiment. The sight of the Imperial Guard in retreat shatters French morale, and the rest of the army flees. The Prussians finally arrive on the field, and Wellington orders a general advance.

As night falls, a delirious Rossendale is killed by a peasant woman looter. His friend and fellow officer informs Sharpe that Rossendale is dead and therefore his promissory note has no value, then leaves to break the news to Jane, who is pregnant with Rossendale's child.

== Characters ==
Fictional

- Richard Sharpe – now a staff officer in the Dutch army
- Patrick Harper – Sharpe's longtime sergeant and friend, now a Dublin pub owner and horse trader
- Lt. Simon Doggett – a British officer on the Prince of Orange's staff
- Lord John Rossendale – a British cavalry officer, and the lover of Sharpe's unfaithful wife Jane
- Jane Sharpe – Sharpe's wife, pregnant with Rossendale's child
- Lucille Castineau – Sharpe's French lover
- Daniel Hagman – one of Sharpe's old riflemen
- Major Dunnett – a rifle officer, Sharpe's former commander
- Lieutenant Harry Price – an officer in the Prince of Wales' Own Volunteers
- Major Peter d'Alembord – an officer in the Prince of Wales' Own Volunteers
- Lieutenant Colonel Joseph Ford – the new commanding officer of the Prince of Wales' Own Volunteers
- Paulette - a Belgian prostitute employed by the Prince of Orange

Historical

- Field Marshal Arthur Wellesley, 1st Duke of Wellington – commander of the Anglo-Dutch army
  - Copenhagen, Wellington's mount
- William, Prince of Orange – commander of the allied I Corps
- Harry Paget, Earl of Uxbridge – Wellington's second-in-command
- Rebecque: the Prince of Orange's tutor and aide-de-camp
- Major General William Dornberg
- the Duke of Richmond
- the Duchess of Richmond
- Miguel de Alava – Spanish envoy to the Netherlands, and Wellington's close friend
- Major General Sir Thomas Picton
- Colonel James Macdonnell - the garrison commander at Hougoumont
- Prince Bernhard Carl of Saxe-Weimar-Eisenach
- Colin Halkett - the commander of an infantry unit destroyed due to the Prince of Orange's ill-advised orders
- Generalfeldmarschall Gebhard von Blücher - the commander of the Prussian army
- Generalleutnant August von Gneisenau – the chief of staff of the Prussian army
- Napoleon Bonaparte – the restored Emperor of France
- Marshal Michel Ney, Napoleon's primary field commander
- François Étienne de Kellermann - the commander of the cavalry charge at Quatre Bras

== References to/in other novels ==
- Lord John Rossendale first appeared in the novel Sharpe's Regiment as an aide to Prince Regent who assists Sharpe with dealing with the Prince's bizarre behavior. In the subsequent novel Sharpe's Revenge, he meets Jane when she comes to England to intercede on Sharpe's behalf, and the two fall madly in love, while Jane is the guardian of Sharpe's fortune (looted from the French during the Vitoria Campaign in Sharpe's Honour).
- Lucille and Sharpe met and fell in love in Sharpe's Revenge, when Sharpe decided to settle in Normandy.
- In the subsequent novel Sharpe's Devil, the prologue of which takes place in 1819, Sharpe confirms that Jane is still alive, and therefore he is still legally married to her and prevented from marrying Lucille. Sharpe is also questioned by a Spanish official in Chile about his experience at Waterloo, and recalls that what frightened him most was the overwhelming French artillery fire.
- A passing reference to Sharpe is made in Cornwell's novel Gallows Thief, when another Waterloo veteran mentions a "tall Rifle officer" who faced down the Imperial Guard.
- Gallows Thief also refers to one of Waterloo's minor characters, a cavalry lieutenant named Witherspoon, killed in the opening hours of the battle. Witherspoon's cousin, another Witherspoon, appears in Gallows Thief as secretary to Lord Sidmouth, and mentions his cousin's death to Rider Sandman, the protagonist of the novel and another Waterloo veteran.
- Sharpe and Lucille's son, Patrick-Henri, appears in Cornwell's Starbuck Chronicles, taking place during the American Civil War, as a French cavalry officer posted to America as an observer, where he is known as Patrick Lassan (Lucille's maiden name).
- In The Bloody Ground, the fourth volume of the Starbuck Chronicles, an officious Confederate Army officer surveying the ground at Sharpsburg, suggests that the Confederate army garrison a farmhouse in the same manner that Wellington garrisoned Hougoumont at Waterloo; not expecting his audience to know anything of military history, the officer is nonplussed when two others retort that the farmhouse is vulnerable in the same manner as La Haye Sainte, which fell during the battle.

== Historical influences ==
In his historical note, Bernard Cornwell cites, as his two primary sources, Jac Weller's Wellington at Waterloo and Lady Elizabeth Longford's Wellington: The Years of the Sword.

== Television adaptation ==
The novel was adapted as the fifth-season finale (and last regular episode) of the Sharpe television series, guest starring Paul Bettany as the Prince of Orange, Neil Dickson as Uxbridge, Oliver Tobias as Rebecque and Chloe Newsome as Paulette, with the latter having her nationality changed to English. The adaptation was largely faithful to the novel but several characters were omitted such as D'Alembord, Charlie Weller and Sharpe and Lucille's son Henri (since her pregnancy had been removed from the adaptation of Sharpe's Revenge). Others, such as Dunnett and the Claytons, had been killed in earlier episodes, although Harry Price was retained despite a character of the same name apparently dying in Sharpe's Company. Other small changes included having Sharpe's friends Hagman and Harris killed as a result of one of Orange's orders (in the novel, Hagman dies in the main battle while Harris was created for the series), a cleaner death for Rossendale (who is bayonetted by French soldiers) and Ford being killed by artillery in the closing stages of the battle.
