= Sharpe's Revenge =

1989 historical novel by Bernard Cornwell

- First edition
- Author: Bernard Cornwell
- Language: English
- Series: Richard Sharpe
- Genre: Historical novels
- Publisher: Collins
- Publication date: 1989
- Publication place: United Kingdom
- Media type: Print (Hardback & Paperback)
- Preceded by: Sharpe's Siege
- Followed by: Sharpe's Waterloo

Sharpe's Revenge is the nineteenth historical novel in the Richard Sharpe series written by Bernard Cornwell, first published in 1989. The peace of 1814 formally ends the Peninsular War, but it does not end all hostilities among individuals.

== Plot summary ==
In 1814, Richard Sharpe and his second wife, Jane, quarrel over his imminent duel with Captain Bampfylde, resulting from the latter's cowardice in the previous novel, Sharpe's Siege. Just in case, Sharpe grants her full authority over the considerable sum of money he has lodged with his prize agent in London. Jane returns to England on her own. Sharpe wants her to purchase a country home in Dorset, but she makes it clear she wants to live in London. After Bampfylde shoots first and misses, he reveals his cowardice as Sharpe takes his time and carefully aims. Sharpe unintentionally wounds Bampfylde in the buttocks.

Sharpe then acts as chief of staff of General Nairn's brigade in the Battle of Toulouse. Shortly afterwards, however, he learns that Napoleon has been defeated and the war ended a week or two before. Sharpe, Harper and Frederickson go to Bordeaux to await transport to England. There Sharpe learns that Jane has closed out his account, withdrawing well over £18,000.

Sharpe and Frederickson are arrested in Bordeaux. They are accused of stealing Napoleon's treasure, which had been concealed at Teste de Buch, the fortress they had captured in Sharpe's Siege, based on a witness statement by Napoleon's spymaster, Major Pierre Ducos, an old and bitter enemy of Sharpe's. In reality, Ducos himself stole the treasure, murdering the colonel who delivered it to him and suborning most or all of the accompanying Dragoons. Sharpe and Frederickson realize that they need the testimony of the fort's French commander, Henri Lassan, to exonerate them, so with help from Harper and Captain Peter d'Alembord, the two men escape, and they and Harper set out to find Lassan.

In London, at the urging of a new friend, young widow Lady Spindacre, Jane buys a town house in fashionable Cork Street. On hearing of her husband's arrest, she contacts Sharpe's former ally, Lord John Rossendale, but instead of using his influence on Sharpe's behalf, he becomes Jane's lover.

Sharpe, Harper and Frederickson make their way to Lassan's ancestral home in Normandy. They arrive shortly after assassins sent by Ducos (disguised as British riflemen) kill Lassan and his mother. Lassan's widowed sister, Lucille Castineau, shoots and nearly kills Sharpe, mistaking him for one of the killers. When she learns the truth, Lucille takes the two fugitives in and nurses Sharpe. Harper is sent to deliver a letter to Jane.

Harper and d'Alembord separately return to England and contact Jane. D'Alembord receives a very chilly reception, while Harper is horsewhipped by Rossendale, at Jane's urging, when he tries to give her a letter from Sharpe. In Normandy, Frederickson grows attached to Lucille, and proposes to her, but is refused. He leaves for Paris to track down Ducos, leaving Sharpe to recover from his injuries. In his absence, Sharpe and Lucille become lovers.

Harper returns and tells Sharpe about Jane, just as Frederickson sends word that Ducos has fled to Naples. The three men travel to Italy, while Lucille, now pregnant, writes to the French prosecutor to exonerate Sharpe. The information is secretly passed on to Napoleon, in exile on Elba, who dispatches General Calvet and 13 Imperial Guardsmen to retrieve his treasure.

In Naples, Ducos passes himself off as a Polish count, buys the protection of the cardinal who actually runs the kingdom behind the scenes, and augments his few French soldiers with some mercenaries to guard the treasure.

Calvet finds Sharpe, and the two form an alliance. The combined force assaults Ducos's villa, capturing the treasure and Ducos, but before they can leave, the cardinal's forces surround the villa (the cardinal wanting the gold and jewels for himself). Sharpe loads a small cannon with gold coins and fires it several times around the Neapolitan troops. The ill-disciplined men break ranks to get the coins, allowing the besieged company to escape by sea, taking Ducos and the remaining treasure with them.

Ducos is executed by firing squad, and all charges against Sharpe are dropped. Sharpe and Frederickson have a falling out when Frederickson learns of Sharpe's relationship with Lucille. Harper, discharged from the army, goes home to Ireland with his Spanish wife and child. Sharpe returns to Lucille (with some of Napoleon's gold).

== Television adaptation ==
The novel was adapted as the first episode of the fifth season of the Sharpe television series, introducing Cécile Paoli as Lucille, seeing Alexis Denisof take over the role of Rossendale and guest starring John Benfield as Calvet, Connie Hyde as Lady Molly and Milton Johns as Hopkinson. The adaptation was basically faithful to the novel but lost many of the connections to Sharpe's Siege as a result of an original story, Sharpe's Mission, being placed between the adaptations.

Instead of the duel with Bampfylde, Sharpe fights a similar duel with Colonel Wigram, the officer who later commands his court martial, for insulting him at Toulouse. Lucille's brother is not Lassan but Maillot, the officer in charge of Napoleon's treasure (with their mother omitted entirely). Nairn's role is given to Major-General Ross, an original recurring character in the series, and the character's fate changed so he is merely wounded, whereas Nairn is killed at Toulouse. D'Alembord is omitted and other characters have their names changed. Frederickson learns of Sharpe and Lucille's relationship much earlier, before travelling to Naples, leaving them semi-reconciled at the end and Ducos' death is altered, with Sharpe shooting him from a distance as he tries to escape. Lucille's pregnancy was also left out, since the adaptation was followed by another original story, Sharpe's Justice, and ends with Sharpe and Harper saying goodbye to Lucille and returning to England.
