= Huger =

Huger is a surname of French origin. It may refer to: Five brothers from a prominent South Carolina family of Huguenot descent who served in the American Revolution:

- Benjamin Huger (American Revolution), killed near Charleston
- Daniel Huger, member of the Continental Congress and United States Congress
- Isaac Huger, a Continental Army officer, Continental Congressman and United States Marshal
- John Huger (1744–1804), mayor of Charleston

And their descendants:

- Benjamin Huger (politician), a United States Representative from South Carolina
- Francis Kinloch Huger, a physician and artillery officer
- Benjamin Huger (general), a United States Army and Confederate Army officer from South Carolina
- Daniel Elliott Huger, a United States Senator from South Carolina
- Thomas B. Huger, a United States Navy and Confederate Navy officer from South Carolina

== See also ==
- Huger, South Carolina
