= Benjamin Huger (American Revolution) =

- Born: c. 1746
- Died: 11 May 1779 (aged 32–33) South Carolina, United States
- Children: Francis

Benjamin Huger (c. 1746 – 11 May 1779) was one of five Huger brothers from South Carolina who served in the American Revolutionary War. Huger became a close friend of LaFayette, having met him upon his arrival near Georgetown in 1777, and his son Francis Kinloch Huger had a role in getting LaFayette temporarily released from prison at Olomouc in the 1790s. Huger was killed in an accidental friendly fire incident near Charleston, South Carolina. His grandson was the Confederate General Benjamin Huger.
