= Francis Kinloch Huger =

American politician

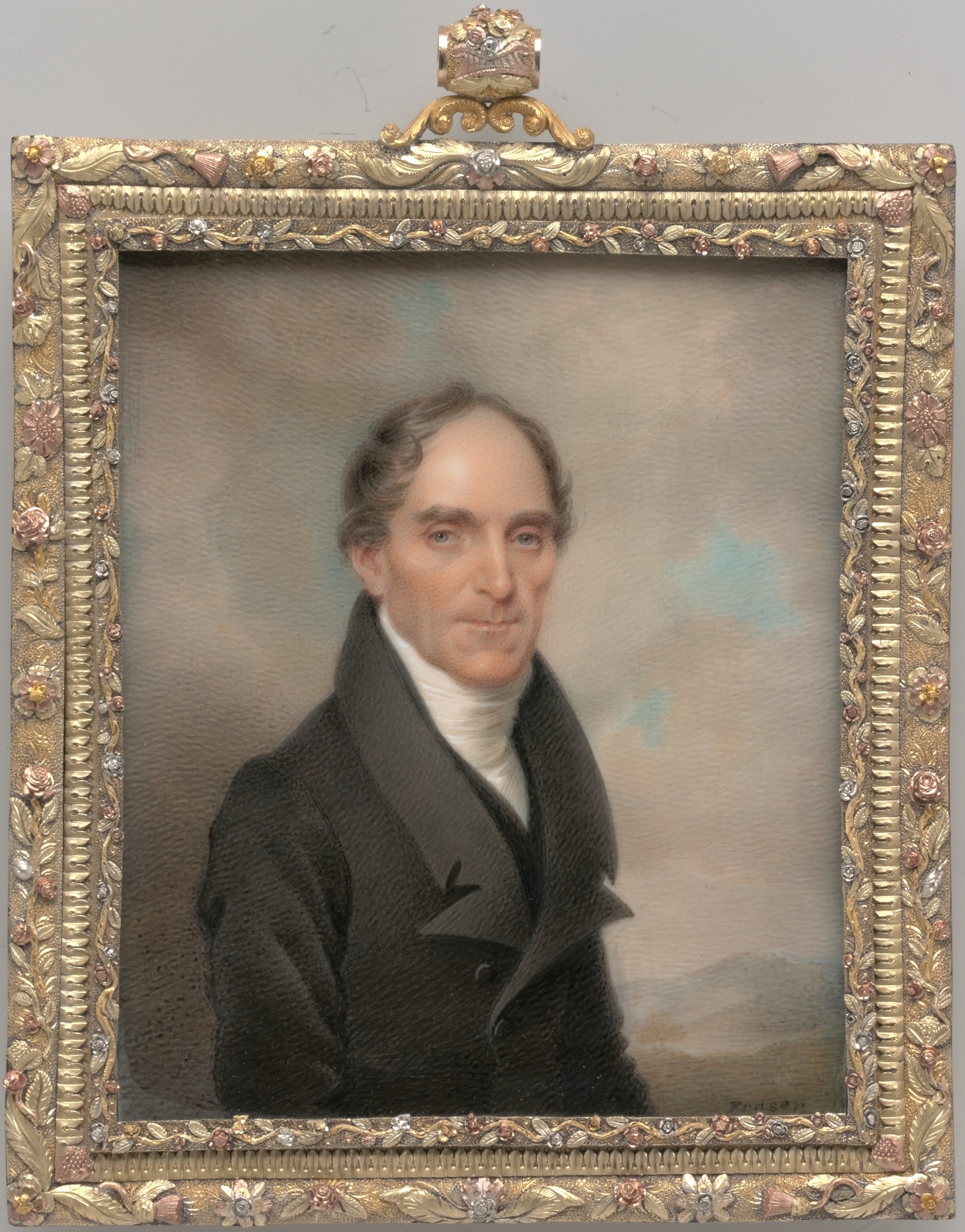
- Dr. Huger by Charles Fraser, 1825
- Born: September 17, 1773; Charleston, South Carolina, US
- Died: February 14, 1855 (aged 81); Charleston, South Carolina, US
- Occupations: Physician, politician, soldier
- Spouse: Harriet Pinckney
- Children: 5, including Benjamin
- Parent(s): Benjamin Huger; Mary Esther Kinloch Huger

Francis Kinloch Huger (September 17, 1773 – February 14, 1855), a medical doctor and artillery officer, was a scion of the Huger family of South Carolina. A member of the South Carolina House of Representatives and South Carolina Senate, he is best known for his leadership of a failed November 1794 attempt to rescue Lafayette from captivity during the wars surrounding the French Revolution.

== Early life ==
Huger was born in Charleston on September 17, 1773. He was the son of Mary Esther (née Kinloch) Huger (1752–1822) and Benjamin Huger (1746-1779), who entertained the Marquis de Lafayette on the French officer's arrival in North America. Then a small boy, Francis became an intense admirer of Lafayette and followed his career closely as the statesman rose to lead his country during the early years of the French Revolution. Hard times came for Lafayette, though, and as a refugee from his native land he was taken prisoner by the empire of Austria.

== Career ==
Meanwhile Francis Huger was studying medicine in Vienna. Learning that Lafayette was a prisoner of war at the fortress of Olmutz near Olomouc in Bohemia (now the Czech Republic), young Huger determined to rescue the international leader in 1794. Together with Eric Bollman a private plot, involving letters written in invisible ink, was hatched to liberate Lafayette. The caper was implemented on November 4, 1794. Although Lafayette was briefly liberated, he was disoriented and recaptured several days later by his enemies. The attempt failed and Huger was himself taken prisoner and joined his would-be prize in Olmutz. After eight months of solitary confinement as a security threat to Austria, Huger was paroled on condition that he return to the United States. Back in South Carolina, the physician studied artillery engineering. He was commissioned as a colonel of artillery during the War of 1812.

Col. Huger was briefly reunited with Lafayette in 1825 when the now-aged French statesman paid an extensive visit to the United States.

== Personal life ==
Col. Huger married Harriet Lucas Pinckney Huger (1783–1824), the daughter of South Carolina Gov. Thomas Pinckney. Together, the couple were the parents of five children, including:

- Elizabeth Pinckney Huger (1804–1882)
- Benjamin Huger (1805-1877), the Confederate general.
- Francis Huger (1811–1849)
- Thomas Pinckney Huger (1816–1875)
- Cleland Kinloch Huger (1818–1892).

Huger died in Charleston on February 14, 1855.

=== Legacy ===
An 1825 ivory miniature of Francis Kinloch Huger, by Charles Fraser, is part of the American collection of the Metropolitan Museum of Art.

A selection of Dr. Huger's papers, including letters from Lafayette after the failed caper of 1794, survives in the custody of the South Carolina Historical Society.
