= Eric Bollman =

German physician (1769–1821)

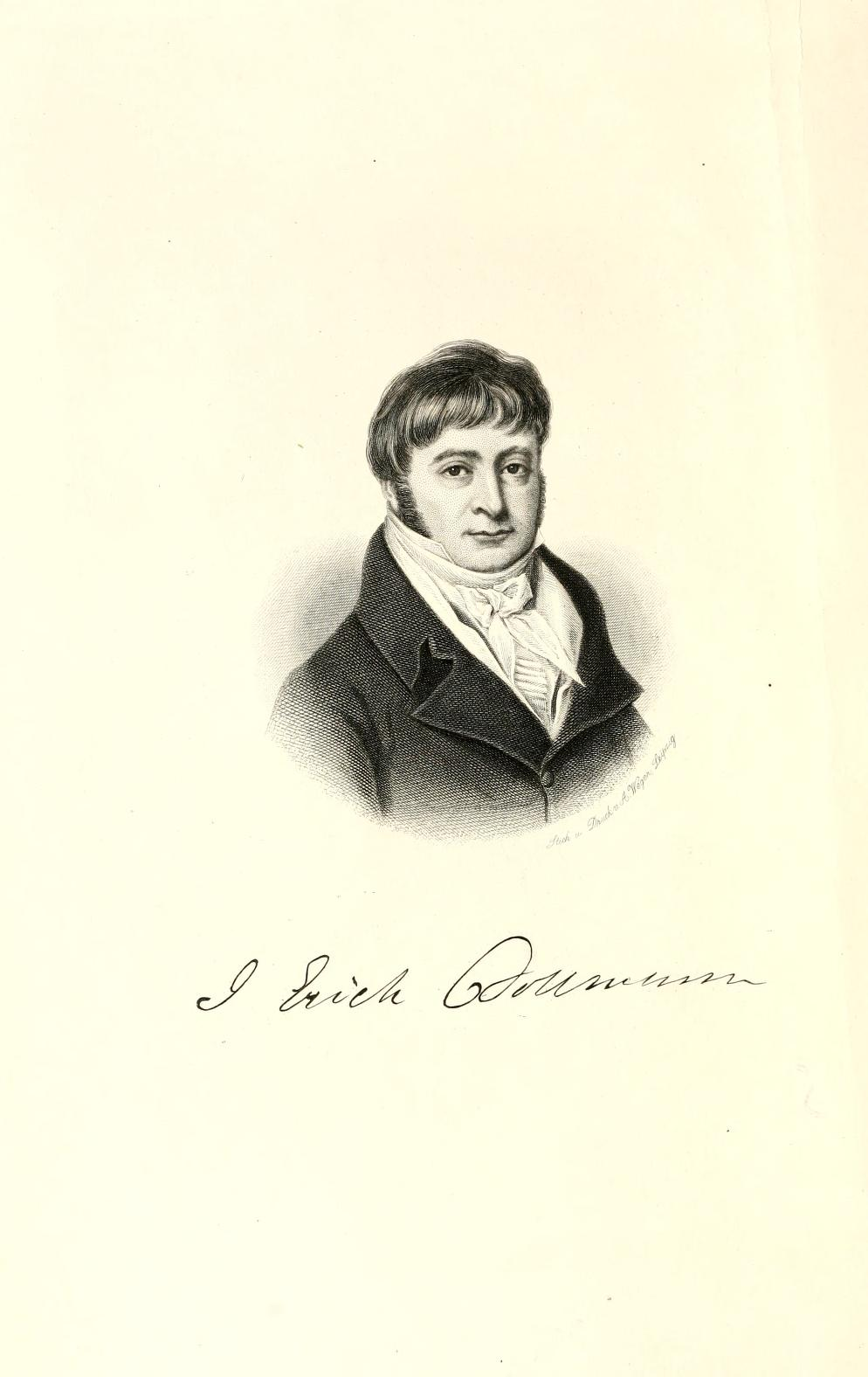
- Born: 1769
- Died: 9 December 1821 (aged 51–52); Kingston
- Parent(s): Georg Martin Bollmann; Caroline Amalia Diederica Hoppe
- Relatives: Jakob Friedrich Bollmann

Justus Erich Bollmann or Eric Bollman (1769 – 9 December 1821) was a German medical doctor. He was involved in a failed attempt to rescue the Marquis de Lafayette from detention in Olomouc. In the United States, he was involved in the Burr conspiracy.

== Biography ==
Justus Erich Bollmann was born in 1769 in Hoya, Holy Roman Empire. He studied medicine at Göttingen, and practised in Karlsruhe and in Paris, where he settled at the beginning of the French Revolution. He accompanied Count Narbonne, who fled to England in 1792, and in London fell in with Lally-Tollendal, who induced him to go to Austria and endeavor to find out where the Marquis de Lafayette was being confined. He established himself as a physician in Vienna. Learning that Lafayette was a prisoner at Olmütz, he formed a plan to rescue him with the assistance of Francis Kinloch Huger (1773-1855), a young man from South Carolina who was studying medicine in Vienna. Communicating with the prisoner through the prison surgeon, the two fell upon his guards while he was taking exercise in a carriage, and succeeded in getting him away on a horse; but he rode in the wrong direction and was recaptured. Bollman escaped to Prussia, but was handed over to the Austrian authorities, who kept him in prison for nearly a year, and then released him on condition that he should leave the country.

He came to the United States in 1796, and was well received on account of his efforts on behalf of Lafayette. His commercial endeavors were not successful, and through Thomas Jefferson he received several government appointments, the last being with an Indian agency in Louisiana in 1805. Then in 1806 he was Aaron Burr's agent in New Orleans, and was eventually arrested in connection with the proceedings against Burr. When the case against Burr foundered, Bollman escaped from serious consequences as well. Bollman did not think Burr's activities conflicted with U.S. interests, and expressed these thoughts in an interview he requested with Jefferson in January 1807.

After Burr's trial, Bollman remained in the United States. In 1814 he returned to Europe, and, after another visit to the United States, took up his residence in London. In both the United States and England, he wrote pamphlets on banking topics. In England he took an interest in discussions on economist David Ricardo.

== Works ==
- Paragraphs on Banks (1810; 2nd ed., Philadelphia, 1811)
- Plans of an Improved System of the Money Concerns of the Union (1816)
- A Letter to Thomas Brand (1819)
- A Second Letter to the Hon. Thomas Brand (1819)
- Strictures on the Theories of M. Ricardo
