= Sharpe's Christmas =

- Short story by Bernard Cornwell
- Language: English
- Genre: Historical short story

Publication
- Published in: The Daily Mail
- Publication type: Newspaper
- Publication date: 1994
- Publication place: United Kingdom
- Media type: Print

Chronology
- Series: Sharpe
Sharpe's Storm	Sharpe's Siege

"Sharpe's Christmas" is a short story by historical fiction author Bernard Cornwell. It features Cornwell's fictional hero Richard Sharpe. It was originally written for the British newspaper The Daily Mail, which serialised it during the 1994 Christmas season. An extended version was published by The Sharpe Appreciation Society in a short story collection of the same name in 2003 to raise funds for The Bernard and Judy Cornwell Foundation.

== Plot summary ==
"Sharpe's Christmas" is set in 1813, towards the end of the Peninsular War, and falls after Sharpe's Storm. Major Richard Sharpe and the Prince of Wales Own Volunteers have to stop the French garrison of the fortress of Ochagavia from escaping back to France. The garrison consists of three hundred soldiers, plus their women and children and another thousand men from the 75th Line Infantry Regiment, commanded by Colonel Caillou. The garrison is commanded by Colonel Gudin, an old friend of Sharpe's from his days in India. To ensure the garrison's swift escape, Brigadier General Picard is sent with his brigade to the village of Irati in the Pyrenees, along Gudin's escape route. Sharpe fends off Picard's brigade, but allows Colonel Gudin, the women and children and the 75th's Imperial Eagle to escape.
