= The Starbuck Chronicles =

Novel series by Bernard Cornwell

The Starbuck Chronicles are a series of historical fiction novels by British author Bernard Cornwell set during the American Civil War. They follow the exploits of Boston-born Confederate officer Nathaniel Starbuck.

Four novels have been written, and the series is still unfinished due to Cornwell's commitment to other projects. However, he has stated on many occasions that he wishes to return to the character's story, though recently he said he doubted that he would. The series presently includes the following novels:

- Rebel (1993)
- Copperhead (1994)
- Battle Flag (1995)
- The Bloody Ground (1996)

== Plot overview ==
Rebel begins in Richmond, Virginia after the fall of Fort Sumter, where theology student Nathaniel Starbuck has arrived after eloping with a lady friend who has deserted him. Starbuck is saved from an attack by Richmond's residents who think that he is a Yankee spy by his college friend Adam Faulconer's rich father Washington Faulconer. Faulconer wishes to raise a regiment to fight the Yankees, and he appoints Starbuck as one of his aides, with the rank of second lieutenant. Starbuck is there by circumstance, not for politics, and he is given the task of recruiting a tough Mexican–American War veteran named Thomas Truslow, who lives in the fictional Faulconer County. He succeeds by using his status as trainee preacher to dedicate the grave of Truslow's wife and officiate in the marriage of his wayward daughter Sally Truslow. Many other events occur between this and the start of the hostilities, when the Faulconer Legion marches off to the First Battle of Bull Run. It is here that Starbuck alienates himself from Faulconer. Copperhead follows Starbuck during the period of the Union invasion of the Confederacy by the Army of the Potomac under General McClellan. Battle Flag is set during the Second Battle of Bull Run. The Bloody Ground follows Starbuck as the Confederate army under Robert E. Lee invades the North, culminating in the Battle of Antietam.

== Major characters ==
- Nathaniel "Nate" Starbuck – The protagonist of the novels, Nate is a young Boston-born Yale theology undergraduate who finds himself in Richmond upon the outbreak of the Civil War and joins the Confederate army. He is described as tall, handsome and clean shaven with grey eyes and long dark hair.
- Washington Faulconer – A wealthy Virginia slave owner and fierce Confederate patriot who uses his own finances to raise the "Faulconer Legion", appointing himself as its commander. He is described as tall and fair with a square cut beard and blue eyes.
- Thomas Truslow – A farmer whose past ventures include fighting in the Mexican–American War and various criminal activities. He is pursued by Washington Faulconer to enter the Legion and is persuaded to join by Nate Starbuck. He begins life in the legion as its most respected (feared) sergeant and is elevated to the rank of captain after the battle of Cedar Mountain. The novels describe him as squat, tough and bearded.
- Sally Truslow – The daughter of Thomas Truslow, who after the outbreak of war becomes a whore at Richmond's most exclusive establishment to support herself. She is described as not older than 16 in the first novel and of breathtaking beauty.
- Adam Faulconer – The son of Washington Faulconer and best friend of Nate Starbuck. He is described as similar in appearance to his father. Despite being an officer in the legion, he has a strong pacifist streak and increasingly becomes disillusioned with fighting to preserve slavery. At the end of Copperhead, he deserts to fight for the Union cause.
- Belvedere Delaney – A lawyer in Richmond who works in various capacities for the Confederate army, while spying for the Union. He uses his position to empower and enrich himself and has many business interests including Sally's brothel. He is described as rotund with a perfect set of teeth. He is the half-brother of Ethan Ridley, Starbuck's main antagonist in Rebel.
- Thaddeus "Pecker" Bird – The Faulconer County school master and brother-in-law of Washington Faulconer. He is described as tall and thin with a long beard, who bobs his head back and forth when laughing, which has earned him the nickname "Pecker". Although firstly thought of as an eccentric fool, he gains the respect of the legion with his natural battle leadership abilities.
- Patrick Lassan – A French cavalry colonel who begins the story as an observer in George McClellan's army but is inspired by Starbuck to switch sides and ride with the Confederate cavalry. He is described as tall and dark haired with a scarred face and an eye patch. He is the son of Richard Sharpe (the star of Bernard Cornwell's Sharpe series) and carries his father's Pattern 1796 heavy cavalry sword.

=== Historical figures ===
- Robert E. Lee
- Thomas "Stonewall" Jackson
- Irvin McDowell
- John Pope
- Joseph E. Johnston
- George B. McClellan
- Allan Pinkerton
- Oliver Wendell Holmes Jr.

== Faulconer Legion ==
The Faulconer Legion is a fictional regiment of the Commonwealth of Virginia and the Confederate Army, the central unit of the Starbuck Chronicles. Shortly after the beginning of the war, Washington Faulconer is determined to set up a regiment free of state government control because he was unimpressed by Robert E. Lee and his lack of support. He returns from Richmond to find recruitment in full swing for the Legion; at least 10 companies have been recruited, along with a squadron of cavalry and two crews of artillery. Faulconer is the regiment's first colonel; his senior officers are Major Pelham, a veteran of the War of 1812, having fought at Bladensburg, and Major "Pecker" Bird, Faulconer's brother-in-law and a schoolmaster by profession. Major Danson is the Legion's initial surgeon and the local doctor. Faulconer leads an attack on the Baltimore and Ohio Railroad which fails. It is an unfortunate start to the war for Faulconer, and he shows a distinct lack of military judgment—although he thinks of himself as a competent soldier and tactician.

=== First Battle of Manassas ===
On the Fourth of July, the fully equipped Legion marches to Seven Springs to be sworn into the Confederate army. However Major Pelham suffers a heart attack and dies before the Legion leaves, a great blow to the men as Pelham was a popular leader. The Legion then marches to Roskill railhead. They bundle onto a train to Manassas and are assigned to Colonel Nathan Evans' brigade. But Faulconer does not trust Evans' military judgement and seeks out General P.G.T. Beauregard, to be moved closer to where he believes the action will be (on the Confederate right). Nathaniel Starbuck, whom Faulconer has dismissed and sent back to the Union lines, discovers advancing Union troops under David Hunter and Samuel P. Heintzelman. He informs Evans of their positions, and the Legion, under the command of Major Bird, marches to repel the Federal attack. The regiment fights the advancing Union troops well, but Faulconer and his aide Ethan Ridley return and Faulconer is disgusted by the insubordination of Bird and Starbuck. In the renewed Union attack, Captain Adam Faulconer is wounded and the Legion collapses. Faulconer tries to rally them but is himself wounded. In the panic Truslow and Bird save the colours. After the battle, Faulconer claims that Starbuck killed Ethan Ridley, but this is put down to delirium; his claims are true however. An embittered and wounded Faulconer is promoted to brigadier general and Major Bird takes command of the Legion.

=== Ball's Bluff and Seven Pines ===
With Faulconer away in Richmond supposedly recovering from his wound, Bird makes Starbuck the captain in command of K Company, with Truslow as his sergeant. The Legion takes part in defeating the Union crossing at the Battle of Ball's Bluff, with Starbuck's company turning the northern flank. Adam, now a major on General Joseph E. Johnston's staff, is disgusted by the slaughter so begins feeding information on the Confederate defences to Starbuck's older brother James, a major in the Union army. Faulconer forms his own brigade and has the Legion attached to it, dismissing Starbuck. Having discovered Adam's betrayal, Starbuck crosses the lines posing as an ally of Adam to convince General George B. McClellan that the southern defences are stronger than they are. He then rejoins the southern army at the Battle of Seven Pines and takes part in Colonel Micah Jenkins breaking the first line of the northern position, although Adam has already sabotaged the attack by failing to pass on battle orders to General Benjamin Huger. He uses his knowledge of Adam's actions to force Faulconer to restore him to his company and Faulconer also reluctantly promotes Bird to lieutenant colonel. During the Battle of Gaines Mill, Adam deserts to the Union troops in full view of everyone. The Legion drive the northern forces from the ridge but suffer heavy casualties, reforming with eight companies of surviving troops.

=== Cedar Mountain and Second Battle of Manassas ===
General Faulconer appoints an alcoholic veteran and ex-slave merchant, Colonel Swynyard, as his second in command. At the Battle of Cedar Mountain, Colonel Bird is seriously wounded and command of the Legion devolves upon Major Hinton. The perfidious Swynyard is wounded by a passing cannonball and left on the field to die by Starbuck and Truslow. However, Swynyard's injury is not serious; it brings about a religious conversion in him, so he frees his slaves and gives up alcohol. He apologises to Starbuck for his behaviour toward him and promises to make things right. Meanwhile, Adam Falconer has joined a unit of Northern Cavalry, Galloway's horse, made up entirely of Southeners who know the terrain. Major Galloway has received funding from Starbuck's father the Reverend Dr Elial Starbuck, who in return asks the Major to get him a Confederate Battleflag. Adam leads a raid on his father's estate to obtain horses for his new command. To keep their promise to Dr Starbuck, Adam then attacks the Faulconer Brigade's encampment and manages to capture the Faulconer Legion battle flag and also steal the General's sabre, given to his grandfather by Lafayette. At the same time, the majority of the Legion's officers are celebrating Major Hinton's 50th birthday in a nearby tavern and are attacked there by a detachment of Galloway's horse led by the nefarious Captain William Blythe. In the ensuing chaos, the tavern is set on fire and almost all the officers killed. Faulconer is dismissed from command of the Brigade by General Jackson. Colonel Swynyard is appointed Brigade commander while Starbuck is promoted to Major and given command of the Legion. Truslow is made a captain in charge of Starbuck's old company. At the Second Battle of Manassas, Major Medlicott, who Faulconer attempted to make Legion commander ahead of Starbuck and who has command of the right hand wing, repeatedly refuses to fight until Starbuck kills him for refusing an order to advance. Galloway is killed when the horse are caught up in the flanking movement by Lee's reinforcements. In the aftermath, Starbuck burns Galloway's farm in retaliation for the burning of the tavern and recovers the battle flag from his father.

=== Harper's Ferry and Sharpsburg ===
Starbuck leads the Legion at the Battle of Chantilly, driving the last of John Pope's men out of Confederate territory, but Faulconer has obtained a position with the War Department and arranges to have Lieutenant Colonel Maitland placed in charge of the Legion while Starbuck is given command of a punishment battalion, the Yellowlegs. Starbuck manages to expose his superior, Colonel Holborow, as keeping the battalion away from the lines so he can sell their supplies on the black market and has the Yellowlegs transferred to Swynyard's brigade for the Maryland Campaign. The Legion stumble across Blythe, who fled the field at Manassass, and claims to be a Confederate officer, Captain Billy Tumlin, who was taken prisoner: He is made Starbuck's second-in-command. Meanwhile, Adam has been assigned as a courier by intelligence officer Colonel Thorne and collects a copy of Lee's battle plan which was left for him by Major Delaney. Adam is ambushed and killed by Southern horsemen but hides the order, which is later found by Northern troops. Starbuck leads the Yellowlegs to clear the ridge at the Battle of Harpers Ferry but the nervous Maitland keeps the Legion back. At the Battle of Sharpsburg, Swynward's brigade is decimated by Hooker's repeated attacks but manages to stand their ground, with Maitland drinking heavily to make it through the battle. Blythe flees back to Northern lines after manipulating Captain Dennison and Sergeant Case into trying to kill Starbuck; the attempt fails and Starbuck turns a cannon on them in retaliation. As the Confederates prepare to withdraw, Maitland is sent back to a staff position in Richmond, Starbuck is given command of the surviving members of both the Legion and the Yellowlegs, and Swynyard is promoted to brigadier general.

=== Colors ===
The colours of the Faulconer Legion are composed of the Confederate Battle Flag and the Faulconer coat of arms with the motto "Forever Ardent". They are six feet by six as opposed to the four feet advocated by the War Department.

== Tie-ins to other Cornwell books ==
In the second book of the Starbuck series, Copperhead, Starbuck encounters Patrick Lassan, Chasseur Colonel of the French Imperial Guard, and French Military Observer attached to the Union Army. The son of an English father and a French mother, he uses his mother's last name – Lassan – because his parents never married. It is ultimately revealed that Lassan is the son of Richard Sharpe. His sword, described as an oversized steel-hilted straight sword, is likely the same Pattern 1796 heavy cavalry sword carried by his father throughout the earlier Peninsular War. He tells James Starbuck that he lost an eye to a "Russian shell" which, based on timing, was likely during the Crimean War.
