= Bernard Cornwell =

British writer (born 1944)

Bernard Cornwell OBE
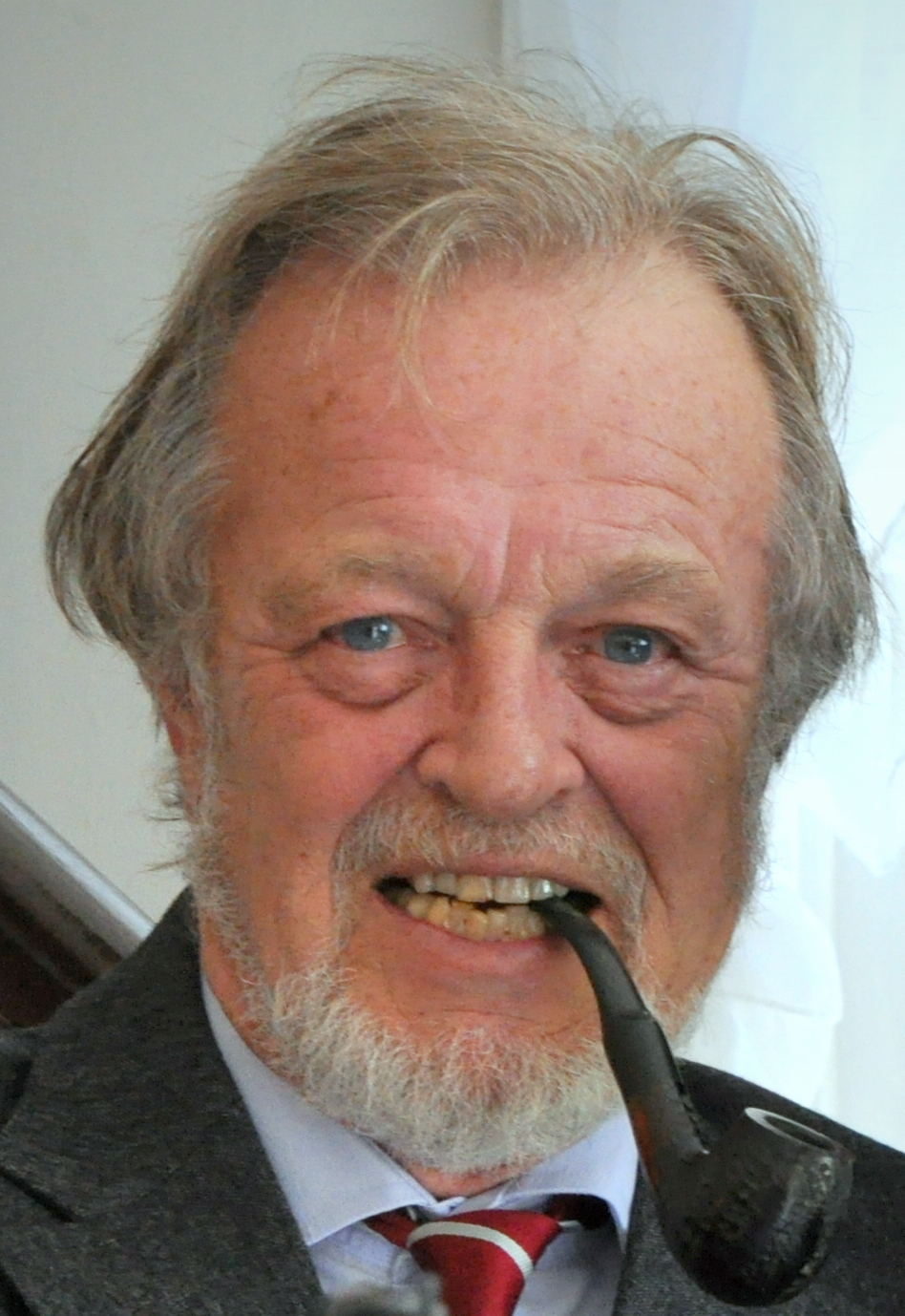
- Cornwell in 2013
- Born: 23 February 1944 (age 82); London, England
- Occupation: Author
- Writing career
- Genres: Historical fiction, historical non-fiction
- Notable works: The Saxon Stories; Sharpe; The Warlord Chronicles
- Website: www.bernardcornwell.net

Bernard Cornwell OBE (born 23 February 1944) is an English author of historical novels and a history of the Waterloo campaign. He is best known for his long-running series of novels about Napoleonic Wars rifleman Richard Sharpe. He has also written The Saxon Stories, a series of thirteen novels about the unification of England.

He has written historical novels primarily based on English history, in five series, and one series of contemporary thriller novels. A feature of his historical novels is an end note on how they match or differ from history, and what one might see at the modern sites of the events described. He wrote a nonfiction book on the battle of Waterloo, in addition to the fictional story of the famous battle in the Sharpe series. Three of the historical novel series have been adapted for television: the Sharpe television series by ITV, The Last Kingdom by the BBC/Netflix and The Winter King for MGM+. He lives in the US with his wife, alternating between Cape Cod, Massachusetts, and Charleston, South Carolina.

== Biography ==
Cornwell was born in London in 1944. His father was Canadian airman William Oughtred and his mother was Englishwoman Dorothy Cornwell, a member of the Women's Auxiliary Air Force. He was adopted and brought up in Thundersley, Essex, by the Wiggins family; they were members of the Peculiar People, a strict sect of pacifists who banned frivolity of all kinds, and even medicine up to 1930. Reacting to being raised by Christian Fundamentalists, he grew up rejecting all religions and became an atheist.

After his adoptive father died, he changed his last name by deed poll from Wiggins to Cornwell, his birth mother's maiden name. Prior to that, he had used Bernard Cornwell as a pen name. He met his father for the first time when he was 58, after telling a journalist on a book tour, "what I wanted to see in Vancouver was my real father". There he met his half-siblings, with whom he shares many traits, and learned his genealogy. He believes he is a descendant of Uhtred the Bold, upon whom he partly based the Saxon Stories book series.

Cornwell was sent to Monkton Combe School in Somerset. He read history at University College London between 1963 and 1966 and worked as a teacher after graduating. He attempted to enlist in the British armed services at least three times but was rejected on the grounds of myopia.

Following his work as a teacher, Cornwell joined the BBC's Nationwide and was later promoted to head of current affairs at BBC Northern Ireland. He then joined Thames Television as editor of Thames News.

His first marriage ended in divorce in the 1970s. He met his second wife, Judy, in 1978 in Edinburgh while he was working for BBC Northern Ireland; she was a travel agent from the US and the mother of three children from a previous marriage. He relocated to the United States in 1979 after marrying her. He was unable to get a United States Permanent Resident Card (green card), so he started writing novels, as this did not require a work permit. He later became an American citizen.

== Career ==
As a child, Cornwell loved the novels of C. S. Forester which chronicled the adventures of fictional British naval officer Horatio Hornblower during the Napoleonic Wars. He was surprised to find that there were no army counterparts, so he wrote such a series himself—further motivated by the need to support himself through writing. As his chief protagonist he created a rifleman involved in most of the major battles of the Peninsular War, taking the character's name from rugby player Richard Sharp.

Cornwell originally planned to start the series with the Siege of Badajoz but decided instead to begin with a couple of "warm-up" novels. These were Sharpe's Eagle and Sharpe's Gold, both published in 1981. He went on to tell the story of Badajoz in Sharpe's Company published in 1982. He had a seven-book deal with his publisher.

Cornwell and wife Judy co-wrote a series of novels published under the pseudonym "Susannah Kells": A Crowning Mercy published in 1983, Fallen Angels in 1984, and Coat of Arms (aka The Aristocrats) in 1986. Cornwell's strict Protestant upbringing forms the background of A Crowning Mercy, which takes place during the English Civil War. He also published Redcoat in 1987, an American Revolutionary War novel set in Philadelphia during its 1777 occupation by the British.

Cornwell was approached by a production company interested in making television adaptations of the first eight books of his Sharpe series. They asked him to write a background novel to give them a starting point to the series and also requested that the story featured a substantial role for Spanish characters in order to secure co-funding from Spain. The result was Sharpe's Rifles, published in 1987 and set in the period of the English retreat at A Coruña. It resulted in a series of Sharpe television films starring Sean Bean.

This was followed by a series of modern thrillers with sailing as a background and common themes: Wildtrack published in 1988, Sea Lord (or Killer's Wake) in 1989, Crackdown in 1990, Stormchild in 1991, and the political thriller Scoundrel in 1992.

Cornwell wrote two books a year for a long time, slowing to one per year in his sixties. His idea of historical fiction is of presenting a "big story" in historical events and a "little story" in fictional plot. Patrick O'Brian, who wrote the Aubrey-Maturin series of historical adventures set in the Napoleonic era, said that there was "too much plot, not enough lifestyle" in the novels of Cornwell and C. S. Forester. Cornwell took that as a compliment and an accurate appraisal of the difference between the style of O'Brian and his own, while appreciating the association with Forester.

With the success of the Sharpe series, Cornwell began to write about other periods and historical events in English and American history, both in series and in single novels. Azincourt was released in the UK in October 2008. The protagonist is an archer who participates in the Battle of Agincourt, a devastating defeat suffered by the French during the Hundred Years' War. In 2004, he released The Last Kingdom, beginning the Saxon Stories centered on protagonist Uhtred of Bebbanburg and telling how the nation of England began forming under King Alfred the Great. He realised that few in England knew how England began, unlike Americans who have a clear date for their nation's beginning—so this became his "big story". His own ancestral roots gave him the "little story" in the protagonist Uhtred.

The Fort, published in 2010, is another of Cornwell's stand-alone novels. It tells of the Penobscot Expedition of 1779 during the American Revolutionary War.

Bernard Cornwell has been extremely successful in his writing career, selling 30 million books by 2015 throughout the various series and individual novels, and he continues to write new novels.

== Honours ==
Cornwell was appointed an Officer of the Order of the British Empire (OBE) in the 2006 Birthday Honours for services to literature and television production.

== Novel series ==
=== Sharpe stories ===
Cornwell's first series of historical novels features the adventures of Richard Sharpe, an English soldier during the Napoleonic Wars, in particular the Peninsular Wars once Arthur Wellesley was sent to lead the campaign against Napoleon's forces on the Iberian Peninsula. The first 11 books of the Sharpe series began with Sharpe's Rifles and ended with Sharpe's Waterloo, published in the US as Waterloo. These detail Sharpe's adventures in various Peninsular War campaigns over the course of seven years. Subsequently, Cornwell wrote Sharpe's Tiger, Sharpe's Triumph, Sharpe's Fortress, Sharpe's Trafalgar, and Sharpe's Prey, depicting Sharpe's earlier adventures under Wellington's command in India, including his hard-won promotion to the officer corps, his return to Britain, and his arrival in the 95th Rifles; he also wrote the sequel Sharpe's Devil, set six years after the end of the wars. Since 2003, he has written further "missing adventures" set during the Peninsular War era, based on major battles of that long campaign, for a total of 22 novels in this series. The Sharpe Appreciation Society has also published three short stories by Cornwell: "Sharpe's Skirmish", "Sharpe's Christmas" and "Sharpe's Ransom".

Cornwell mentions in notes at the end of the Sharpe series that he was initially dubious about the casting of Sean Bean for the television adaptations, but that the doubts did not last and he was subsequently so delighted that he dedicated Sharpe's Battle to him. He has admitted that he subtly changed the writing of the character to align with Bean's portrayal as now he "could not imagine Sharpe as anyone else". One of Cornwell's initial misgivings about Bean was that he did not physically resemble the black-haired Sharpe whom he described in the early books, but he thought that Bean understood and acted the part perfectly, and he subsequently refrained from mentioning Sharpe's hair colour.

=== Warlord Chronicles ===
A trilogy depicting Arthurian Britain. The series posits that post-Roman Britain was a difficult time for the native Britons, being threatened by invasion from the Anglo-Saxons in the East and raids from the Irish in the West. At the same time, they suffered internal power struggles between their petty kingdoms and friction between the old Druidic religion and newly arrived Christianity. The author has often said that these are his own favourite stories; "I have to confess that of all the books I have written these three are my favourites."

=== Grail Quest novels ===
This series deals with a mid-14th century search for the Holy Grail during the Hundred Years' War. Englishman Thomas of Hookton becomes drawn into the quest by a mysterious man called "The Harlequin", who murders Thomas's father in his search for the Grail. Cornwell was planning at one point to write more books about Thomas of Hookton and said that, shortly after finishing Heretic, the third novel in the series, he had "started another Thomas of Hookton book, then stopped it—mainly because I felt that his story ended in Heretic and I was just trying to get too much from him. Which doesn't mean I won't pick the idea up again sometime in the future." He returned to the character in 1356, published in 2012.

=== Saxon Stories/The Last Kingdom ===
The series focuses on the Anglo-Saxon kingdom of Wessex. The idea for the series took shape in his mind after meeting his real father in Canada in his fifties, learning his own ancestry back to that era, to the real-life Uhtred of Bebbanburg, who became Uhtred, the protagonist of the series. Cornwell realised that most English people are unaware of how England came to be, rather than say, Dane-land, in that era of multiple peoples on the island of Great Britain. Uhtred reluctantly helps Alfred the Great, a man he respects but dislikes, further his ambition of uniting all English speakers into a single kingdom. The series continues after the death of Alfred, with his heirs striving to achieve his dream. The first novel was published in 2004. In 2020, the 13th and final book was published.

The Last Kingdom and The Pale Horseman were the basis for the first series of the television series, The Last Kingdom, while The Lords of the North and Sword Song were the basis for the second series. A third series, based on The Burning Land and Death of Kings, was released in November 2018, and a fourth series was released in April 2020. A fifth series was released on March 9, 2022.

=== Starbuck Chronicles ===
Four novels set during the American Civil War follow the adventures of Boston-born Nathaniel Starbuck during his service in the Confederate Army. The series is notable for an appearance by Richard Sharpe's son as a supporting character.

=== Thriller series ===
Cornwell's thriller series are modern mysteries, all with sailing themes. He is a traditional sailor and enjoys sailing his Cornish Crabber christened Royalist. According to Cornwell's website, there may be no additions to the series: "I enjoyed writing the thrillers, but suspect I am happier writing historical novels. I'm always delighted when people want more of the sailing books, but I'm not planning on writing any more, at least not now – but who knows? Perhaps when I retire".

== Nonfiction ==
In addition to his many novels, including a fictional account (Sharpe's Waterloo) of the battle of Waterloo, Cornwell published a nonfiction book, Waterloo: The History of Four Days, Three Armies and Three Battles, released in September 2014, in time for the 200th anniversary of that battle.

== See also ==
- Faulconer County
