= Sylvia Plath bibliography =

Bibliography

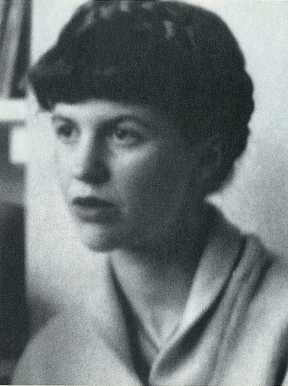
- Plath (1961)
- Books↙: 4
- Novels↙: 1
- Plays↙: 1
- Journals↙: 2
- Letters↙: 1
- Periodicals edited↙: 1

Sylvia Plath (1932–1963) was an American author and poet. Plath is primarily known for her poetry, but earned her greatest reputation for her semi-autobiographical novel The Bell Jar, published pseudonymously weeks before her death.

== Poems ==
Plath published dozens of poems, including:

- "Ariel"
- "Daddy"
- "Lady Lazarus"
- "Mad Girl's Love Song"
- "The Munich Mannequins"
- "Tulips"
- "Two Lovers and a Beachcomber by the Real Sea"

== Prose ==
Plath published only one book in her lifetime—the novel The Bell Jar—but several collected editions of her poetry, short stories, letters, and children's books were published posthumously.

- The Bell Jar (1963), under the pseudonym "Victoria Lucas"
- The Bed Book (children's book – 1976)
- Johnny Panic and the Bible of Dreams (JP), edited by Ted Hughes (short stories, 1977)
- The It-Doesn't-Matter-Suit (children's book – 1996)
- Collected Children's Stories (children's book – 2001)
- Mrs. Cherry's Kitchen (children's book – 2001)
- Mary Ventura and the Ninth Kingdom (2019)
- The Collected Prose of Sylvia Plath (2024), edited by Peter K. Steinberg

== Letters and journals ==
Several of Plath's letters and her personal journals were published after her death. Her early diaries which she started at the age of 11 on 1 January 1944 and wrote till December 1949 remain unpublished. Most of her manuscripts are held at Smith College and Indiana University libraries.

- Letters Home: Correspondence 1950–1963, edited by Aurelia Schober Plath (1975)
- The Journals of Sylvia Plath, edited by Ted Hughes and Frances McCullough (1982)
- The Unabridged Journals of Sylvia Plath, edited by Karen V. Kukil (2000)
- The Letters of Sylvia Plath Volume I: 1940–1956, edited by Peter K. Steinberg and Karen V. Kukil (2017)
- The Letters of Sylvia Plath Volume II: 1956–1963, edited by Peter K. Steinberg and Karen V. Kukil (2018)

== Poetry ==
There are several limited-edition collections of Plath's work. Significant compilations include:

- The Colossus and Other Poems (TC) (1960 – American and British editions are different)
- Ariel (A) (1965 – American and British editions are different)
- Uncollected Poems (UC) (1965)
- Fiesta Melons (FM) (1971)
- Crossing the Water (CtW) (1971 – American and British editions are different)
- Winter Trees (WT) (1972 – American and British editions are different)
- The Collected Poems (TCP) (1981)
- Selected Poems (SP) (1985)
- Plath: Poems (PP) (1998)
- Ariel: The Restored Edition (2004)
- The Poems of Sylvia Plath (upcoming)

== Others ==
- The Magic Mirror (1989), Plath's Smith College senior thesis
- Three Women: A Monologue for Three Voices (1968) play
- Drawings
- Interviews

- The Poet Speaks edited by Peter Orr, published by Barnes and Noble in New York City (1966), pp.167–172

- Editing – American Poetry Now: A Selection of the Best Poems by Modern American Writers, appended to Critical Quarterly Poetry Supplement, number 2 in 1961
- Sylvia Plath Reads, Harper Audio 2000

Plath Reads Plath – 1975, Released as a gramophone record by Credo Records and on Compact Disc by Harper Audio in 2000

- The Art of Sylvia Plath 1970:

- Dialogue en Route c. 1951
- Miss Drake Proceeds to Supper 1956
- On the Plethora of Dryads 1956
- Epitaph for Fire and Flower 1956
- Battle-Scene from the Comic Operatic Fantasy The Seafarer 1957
- Words for a Nursery 1957
- Mushrooms 1959
- In Plaster 1961
- An Appearance 1962
- Lesbos 1962
- Purdah 1962
- Mystic 1963
- Excerpt from a radio play Three Women 1962
- OCEAN 1212-W 1962
- Thalidomide
- Pen drawings by Sylvia Plath

== Full list of publications ==
Title	Date	Collected	Notes
"Mad Girl's Love Song"	August 1953		Poem published in the women's magazine Mademoiselle
"Above the Oxbow"	May 4, 1959		Poem published in The Christian Science Monitor
"Admonition"	April 1959	CG	Poem published in Smith Review, Spring 1959
"Aerialist"	February 7, 1969		Poem published in Cambridge Review
"Aftermath"	October 1959	TC	Poem published in Arts in Society, Fall 1959
"Alicante Lullaby"	1971		Poem published in Crystal Gazer
"All the Dead Dears"	November 1957	TC	Poem published in Grecourt Review
"Amnesiac"	August 3, 1963	WT (US)	Poem published in The New Yorker
"Among the Narcissi"	August 3, 1963	CtW (UK), WT (US)	Poem published in The New Yorker
"Apotheosis"	January 1956		Poem published in The Lyric, Winter 1956
"An Appearance"	1965	UP, AoSP, CtW (UK), WT (US)	Poem published in Times Literary Supplement, January 20, 1966
"The Applicant"	January 1963	A	Poem published in London Magazine
"Apprehensions"	March 6, 1971	CtW (UK), WT (US)	Poem published in The New Yorker
Ariel	1965		Published by Faber and Faber in London and Harper and Row in New York City in 1966
"The Arrival of the Bee Box"	March 6, 1971	CtW (UK), WT (US)	Poem published in The New Yorker
The Bed Book	1976		Children's book published by Faber and Faber in London with illustrations by Quentin Blake and New York City by Harper and Row with illustrations by Emily Arnold McCully
The Bell Jar	1963		Published by William Heineman, Ltd. in London under the pseudonym Victoria Lucas, Faber and Faber in London in 1966, and Harper and Row in New York City in 1971, with a biographical note by Lois Ames and eight drawings by Plath
Child	1971		Published by Rougemont Press as a limited edition of 300 copies
The Collected Poems of Sylvia Plath	1981		Published by Harper and Row in New York City in 1971, edited by Ted Hughes
The Colossus and Other Poems	1960		Published by William Heineman, Ltd. in London, Alfred A. Knopf in New York City in 1962, and Faber and Faber in 1976
Crossing the Water	1971		Published by Faber and Faber in London and Harper and Row in New York City
Crystal Gazer and Other Poems	1971		Published by Rainbow Press in London as a limited edition of 400 copies
"A Day in June"	1952	JP (UK)	Published as a book by Embers Handpress in 1981 as a limited edition of 160
Fiesta Melons	1971		Published by Rougemont Press as a limited edition of 150 copies, with an introduction by Ted Hughes and 11 drawings by Plath
"The Green Rock"	1949	JP (UK)	Published as a book by Embers Handpress in 1982 as a limited edition of 160
Johnny Panic and the Bible of Dreams	1977		Published by Faber and Faber in London
The Journals of Sylvia Plath	1982		Published by Dial Press in New York City, edited by Frances McCullough
Letters Home by Sylvia Plath, Correspondence 1950–1962	1975		Published by Harper and Row in New York City, edited by Aurelia Schober Plath
Lyonesse	1971		Published by Rainbow Press in London as a limited edition of 400 copies
"Million Dollar Month"	1950		Poem written in the early 1950s, published as a book by The Sceptre Press as a limited edition of 150 copies
Plath Reads Plath	1975		Released as a gramophone record by Credo Records
Pursuit	1973		Published by Rainbow Press in London as a limited edition of 100 copies
"Stings"	April 1963	A	Poem published in London Magazine, later printed in Tri-Quarterly in Fall 1966, and published in Naked Poetry in 1969. Revised and published in Pursuit in 1973. Published as a book with facsimile manuscript by The Pioneer Valley Printing Company as a limited edition of 150 copies in 1982.
The Stones of Troy by C. A. Trypanis	August 1957		Book review published in Gemini, Summer 1957
Sylvia Plath Reads	2000		Released as a Compact Disc by Harper Audio
Three Women: A Monologue for Three Voices	June 1957	WT	Published by Turret Books in London as a limited edition of 180 copies, first broadcast on BBC Third Programme on August 19, 1962
The Unabridged Journals of Sylvia Plath, 1950–1962	2000		Published by Random House in New York City, edited by Karen V. Kukil
Uncollected Poems	1965		Published by Turret Books in London as a limited edition of 150 copies
A Winter Ship	1960	AWS, TC	Poem published in The Atlantic Monthly, July 1960 and Encounter, February 1961
A Winter Ship	1960		Published by Tragara Press as a limited edition
Winter Trees	1971		Published by Faber and Faber in London and Harper and Row in New York City in 1972, contents between the two editions differ
Wreath for a Bridal	1970		Published by The Sceptre Press as a limited edition of 100 copies
