= The Applicant =

1962 poem written by Sylvia Plath

- by Sylvia Plath
- Written: 1962
- Country: England
- Language: English
- Lines: 40

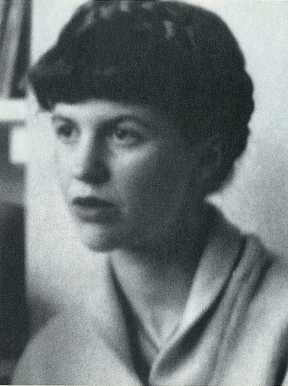
Sylvia Plath (age 28), 1961

"The Applicant" is a poem written by American confessional poet Sylvia Plath on October 11, 1962. It was first published on January 17, 1963 in The London Magazine and was later republished in 1965 in Ariel alongside poems such as "Daddy" and "Lady Lazarus" two years after her death.

The poem is a satirical 'interview' that comments on the meaning of marriage, condemns gender stereotypes and details the loss of identity one feels when adhering to social expectations. The poem focuses on the role of women in a conventional marriage and Plath employs themes such as the conformity to gender norms. It was written a few days after Sylvia Plath’s decision to divorce Ted Hughes and it has been interpreted as a comment on her isolation within that relationship and the lack of power women held in her society.

== Biographical background ==
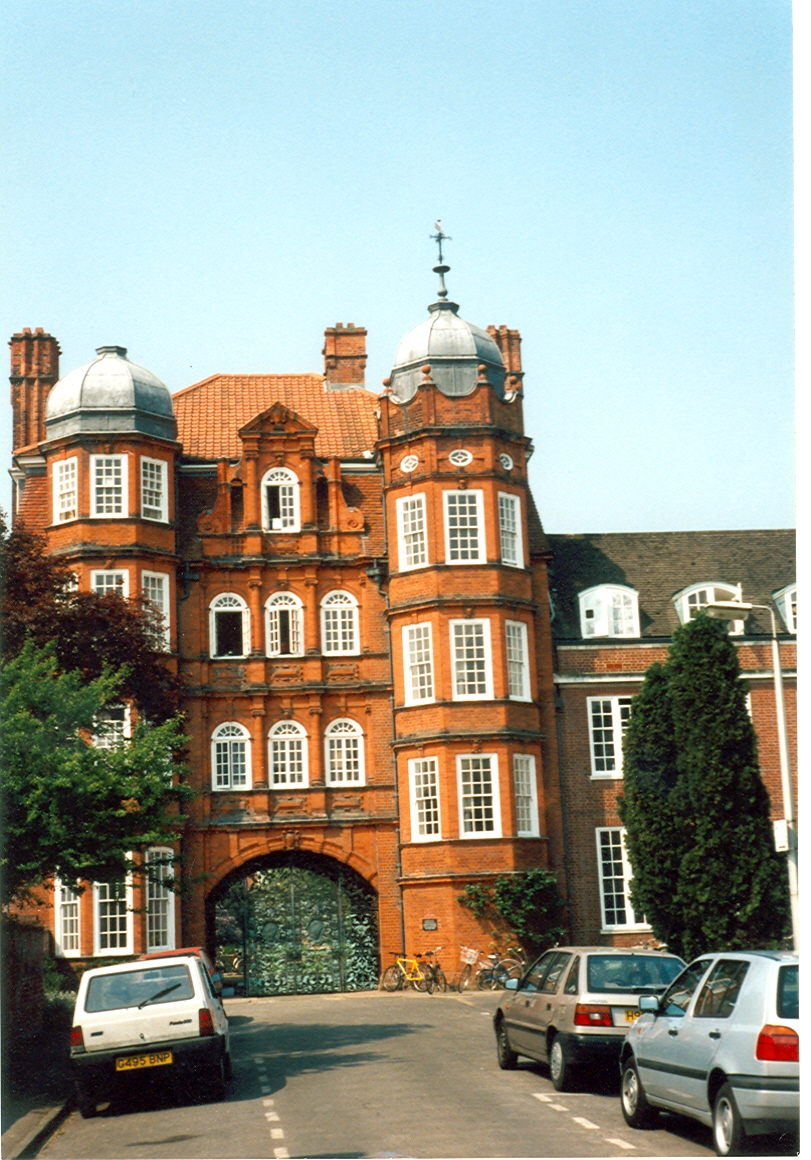
Newnham College, Cambridge, where Sylvia Plath studied

Before Ariel was published, Plath studied at Smith College, a liberal arts school in Massachusetts. She obtained a scholarship and attended the University of Cambridge in England, where she would meet her future spouse, Ted Hughes. Plath and Hughes met on February 25, 1956 and were wed June 16th, 1956 at St George the Matyr, Holborn in London. Plath and Hughes had their first child, Frieda Hughes, on April 1, 1960 and six months later, Plath published The Colossus, her first collection of poetry, in October. Plath fell pregnant again, however had a miscarriage in February 1961. Plath later fell pregnant and gave birth to their son Nicholas Hughes in January 1962. In 1962, Plath discovered that Hughes was having an affair and moved herself and her two children into a Yeats flat in London. During this time she wrote "The Applicant" alongside other poems featured in Ariel, such as "Daddy", "Tulips" and "Lady Lazarus". Not long after, Plath committed suicide by gas inhalation in her kitchen while her two children were sleeping. However, prior to writing 'The Applicant', Plath was notorious for her writings on a loss of identity and connection to the world in The Colossus, particularly in "The Stones" and "Medallion". Plath herself notes that these poems show that "the speaker has utterly lost her sense of identity and relationship to the world". This confessional style of writing is carried on to her writings of Ariel, in particular, "The Applicant".

== Description ==
=== Structure, form and rhyme ===
Plath wrote the poem in free verse poem that consists of 40 lines. The poem was written with quintains and no regular rhyming scheme.

=== Subject matter ===
“The Applicant” was composed with very satirical and condemning tones which included reprimanding the conventional way of living and the gender stereotypes that presented themselves within the public and private sphere of society. Plath ridiculed the role of women in a conventional marriage, which is linked to her marriage to Ted Hughes. Plath and her then husband Ted Hughes were married between 1956-1962 and had two children together. Plath’s second pregnancy ended in a miscarriage and Plath confessed that Hughes domestically abused her two days before the miscarriage. In 1962, it was discovered that Hughes was having an affair with German Poet Assia Wevill which led to Plath and Hughes divorcing.

Initially in “The Applicant”, Plath comments on the idea that women are something to fix a man, asking the applicant what is wrong with them and how can they be fixed. This, is furthered as the personified “it” is presented as the solution. This is a direct condemnation of the social hegemony that a woman was nothing more than a product to ‘fix’ a man. Plath continues this metaphor throughout, emphasising that the woman is a powerless thing that is provided to the male with no choice in the matter, reflecting Plath’s isolation and feelings of being trapped in her relationship with Hughes.

=== Interpretation ===
Margaret Freeman has interpreted "The Applicant" as an exploitation of the traditions of marriage; making a mockery of the sanctity of marriage through being structured with a "series of threes which invoke Anglican church banns, the language of the Anglican wedding ceremony, the institution of marriage, and, by extension, the biblical texts on which the idealised cultural model of Anglican marriage is based." Freeman has furthered this by noting that “will you marry it” is repeated three times throughout the poem, which “directly invokes the church banns, announced in the parish three times before a wedding to ask ‘if there is any just cause why these two should not be joined in holy matrimony.'” Freeman has further interpreted this poem as a "discourse scenario between a speaker and an addressee about an object" where there is no one clear speaker/addressee as there is an ambiguity that pervades the poem: "The object is the treat in the infantilising space, product in the sales space, daughter in the betrothal space, and bride in the marriage rite space. The addressee is the child, customer, applicant, and groom in the four respective spaces." However, Freeman notes that there is a slip in the "blend" of the possible interpretations with that of the speaker as there could be links to a "father" figure in each of the scenarios but this connection is not "projected onto the speaker" to represent the lack of a relationship between Plath and her father.

Manuela Moreira denotes that Plath employs the idea of gender stereotypes through the ambiguity of the genders of the "product" and "applicant". Though it is not specifically mentioned initially that the product is the woman, using phrases such as "To bring teacups and roll away headaches" alludes to a woman due to the notion that it was "part of a woman’s role to bring teacups and do whatever she was told, given her absence of agency, as demonstrated with the line “And do whatever you tell it.”" Moreira further interprets the applicant as an indictment of the gender stereotypes in a conventional marriage stating that "the transgression of gender roles takes place, since the woman who had remained invisible, will accomplish the task of filling in the man’s empty head." Moreira also interprets the applicant as a comment on the body of a woman, more specifically, the missing body of the female as "the female body lives incarcerated to be released as an objectified body." Moreira's interpretation is linked to Plath's feelings of entrapment within her relationship and society.

Carol Margaret Houston has interpreted "The Applicant" as a comment on the role of women in society as well as the role of women in the private sphere of society. Houston notes that "“The Applicant” alerts women to the pitfalls of marriage and the way women are expected to provide all manner of remedies for their husbands." This condemnation of the role of women is what Houston believes to be Plath's strongest quality in her writings, as she highlights the inequities in society with her own experiences of married life, noting that "Plath structured her metaphors and imagery in order to demonstrate her expectations and disillusionment with marriage." Moreover, Houston commented on "The Applicant" treating marriage as a social construct that dehumanises those within the marriage, as they lose who they were as an individual and become a reflection of the person they are married to. Houston explicitly states that "if a woman chooses to live in the state of marriage then she will become what she has married, that is, an otherwise intelligent woman will become a lesser being. A married woman gives up her independence in favour of her husband’s wishes."

== Critical reception ==
Critic Linda Wagner-Martin comments that "The Applicant" shows Plath breaking away from the social expectations of poetry, in particular female poets, and alongside poems such as "Purdah" and "Lady Lazarus", "The Applicant" shows "the persona moving from her conventional state of social acceptance to the flourish of triumph, no matter how unconventional her behaviour has become." Wagner-Martin criticises that Plath uses "The Applicant" as an indictment against gender norms, "this [condescending] voice insults her with regularity: an empty head, a naked body, a scenario right out of the Hallmark anniversary charts, this woman does not even merit the dignity of a feminine personal pronoun, instead, she is an “it”". The dehumanisation of the female is a comment on society and Plath's unconventional way of voicing her discontent with society.

Critic Barbara Hardy comments on the style of writing that Plath utilises in "the applicant' and notes the “unfailing grim humour” that Plath uses to comment on the hegemony of society and how she uses this humour as an attempt to dismantle the social expectations of the time. Hardy also states that Plath possesses a “rationally alert intelligence” within her style of writing and the content of her poetry, particularly in poems such as "Lady Lazarus", "Daddy" and "The Applicant".

Anita Plath Helle comments on Plath's ability to ridicule the private sphere of society as well as commenting on her direct condemnation of the stereotypes of the public sphere: "how far can one push the boundaries of personification, functionality, and gender roles in the postwar dream kitchen while maintaining its legibility?" Helle continues this by commenting on how Plath "uses housewifery to normalise kitchen craziness" and, alongside many other critics, notes that "The Applicant" mocks the sanctity of marriage and the gender stereotypes of a traditional marriage/household. However, unlike other critics, Helle notes that Plath uses "The Applicant" to place the males in the traditionally female role of the typical housewife, and "while Plath effects a change-about in the housewife's form, she alters the eligible man's gender. The applicant-groom takes on the female functionality through appliance shopping".

Critics Tanu Gupta and Anju Sharma, like many other critics, have focused on Plath's indictment on the gender roles of the time and the social hegemony that surrounded this. Gupta and Sharma have detailed "The Applicant" to be about the loss of the woman's true self as she had to give parts of herself to fix her male partner. Gupta and Sharma, too, have commented that "The Applicant" makes a mockery of the private and public spheres of society. Gupta and Sharma's interpretation of "The Applicant" is that "women are imposed, hurt, made into puppets, hollow or blank with no identities or no wills. Plath’s ambivalence toward men, marriage, and motherhood in ["The Applicant"], and the guilt she surely felt help to explain the degree to which her poems are associated with suffering. They reflect not only her perception of external reality, but they project her inner reality as well."

== Related themes ==
=== Gender ===
Plath is known for her comments on the gender stereotypes and her condemnation of these stereotypes within married life. Linda Wagner-Martin comments that Plath often criticised the hegemony to only see women as mothers and motherly beings rather than focussing on the work they produced and other qualities that would otherwise give them substance. Poems such as "Morning Song" detail Plath's struggle with motherhood and how, because of the social pressure to instantly love your child and neglect to acknowledge illnesses such as postpartum depression, she struggled with motherhood. Wagner-Martin comments that "Plath made a self-conscious decision to study women. Her critique of the ideology of the feminine; her critical consciousness of women’s emotional, erotic and economic loyalty and their subservience to men can be shown as developing continuously." Moreover, Plath also wrote poems on the false ways that women maintained their beauty in "Face Lift" and "The Rival". The role of gender was a commonality in Plath's writings; often her poems contained an indictment against gender and this is a theme that is present in "The Applicant" and other works.

=== Integration of the public and private spheres ===
Plath is a confessional poet and has been heavily criticised on integrating the public and private spheres of society. Alongside "The Applicant", poems such as "Daddy" and "Lady Lazarus" are examples of how Plath used public tragedies and fears such as the holocaust (particularly in "Daddy") to express her inner turmoil. Linda Wagner-Martin states that ""Daddy" mixed the sexual with the familia, the physical with the emotional, the father with the husband in a rhythmic swirl of energised language" and it was this mixture of various opposites that exploited both the public and private spheres. "Daddy" was written a day after "The Applicant" and Plath exploited the social hegemony by bringing the private sphere into the public sector and Wagner-Martin notes that ""Daddy" is the answer to the obsequious, fawning voice that wants a job, that wants to be married" in "The Applicant".
