= Ariel (The Tempest) =

Character in play by Shakespeare

- The Tempest character
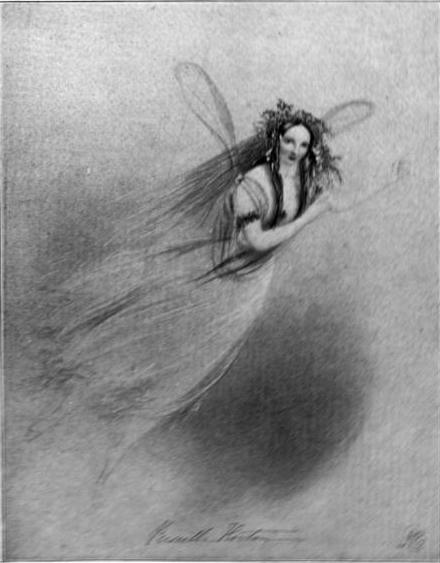
- Priscilla Horton as Ariel, 1838. The part was played by women from the mid-1600s to about 1930. From that time, both men and women played the role.
- Created by: William Shakespeare

In-universe information
- Affiliation: Prospero

Ariel is a spirit who appears in William Shakespeare's play The Tempest. Ariel is bound to serve the magician Prospero, who rescued him from the tree in which he was imprisoned by Sycorax, the witch who previously inhabited the island. Prospero greets disobedience with a reminder that he saved Ariel from Sycorax's spells, and with promises to grant Ariel his freedom. Ariel is Prospero's eyes and ears throughout the play, using his magical abilities to cause the tempest in Act One which gives the play its name, and to foil other characters' plots to bring down their master.

Ariel means "Lion of God" in the Hebrew language. Ariel may also be a simple play on the word "aerial". Scholars have compared Ariel to spirits depicted in other Elizabethan plays, and have managed to find several similarities between them, but one thing which makes Ariel unique is the human edge and personality given to Ariel by Shakespeare.

Because the stage directions in The Tempest are so precise, critics and historians are better able than with other Shakespeare plays to see how this play may originally have been performed. Several of the scenes involving magic have clear instructions on how to create the illusion required, causing critics to make connections and guesses as to exactly what sort of technology would have been used in Shakespeare's troupe to stage Ariel's role in the play. Also, a line by Ariel in Act IV allows scholars to ask whether, due to a shortage of boy actors, the original actor playing Ariel also played the part of Ceres.

Ariel is widely viewed as a male character, although this view has wavered over the years, especially in the Restoration when, for the most part, women played the role.

== Role in the play ==
Ariel first appears in the second scene of the play to report to Prospero on his success in carrying out his command to shipwreck the King of Naples and his crew in a violent tempest. Ariel adds that, as commanded, he saw that none of the group was harmed, but that all landed safely on the island, scattered and separated along the coast. After being praised by Prospero, Ariel pleads for his freedom from the magician's service in return. Prospero declines, reminding him of the state he was in before Prospero rescued him: Ariel had been trapped by the witch Sycorax in a "cloven pine" as a punishment for resisting her commands. After 12 years of pain (and the death of Sycorax), Ariel was released from his prison by Prospero, who pressed the spirit into his service. The magician denies Ariel's request for freedom at this time, but promises that on the condition he follows the rest of his commands, he will grant his wish in two days. For the rest of the play, Ariel is Prospero's eyes and ears, spying on the shipwrecked sailors in invisible form: Only Prospero can see Ariel.

In the second act Ariel briefly appears to stop a conspiracy to kill Alonso, King of Naples, whose brother (and heir to the dukedom), Sebastian, plots to kill him in his sleep. Ariel sings in the ear of Gonzalo, a counsellor to Alonso, to wake him and foil the plot. Ariel also appears in Act Three to foil Caliban's plot to turn the sailors against Prospero and murder him. Later in the same act, he appears with a clap of thunder and rebukes those who were involved in the plot to banish Prospero to the island, displaying his fearful power to the men. He is later called on to gather the spirits of the island before Miranda and Ferdinand and to bring Trinculo, Stephano, and Caliban before Prospero for judgement.

In the final act, Ariel releases the prisoners of Prospero and awakens what is left of the crew of the ship from a deep slumber. Thanks to Ariel's work, Ferdinand and Miranda have fallen in love. Prospero is so impressed by Ariel's matchmaking that he says that he would set Ariel free for that one act. Thus, having fulfilled all of Prospero's tasks, and Prospero himself now being free to leave the island, Ariel is set free.

== Sources ==
The source from which Shakespeare got the idea for Ariel is not known, though there have been many candidates proposed by scholars. Sprites or demons such as Ariel were viewed during the Renaissance from either religious or scientific points of view: religion seeing them as either agents of the devil or agents of God, and science viewing them as neutral subjects which could be brought under the control of the wise. Some scholars compare Ariel to demons of the air described in Renaissance demonology, while others claim that he is an archetype of a more neutral category of sprites. Several of these proposals are outlined below:

[Aerial spirits] can descend to lower regions quicker than thought, and, having taken on bodies from the denser air, appear visibly at times. ... These spirits often disturb the air, stir up tempests and thunders. They do not retain one form, but take on various forms.

— Randall Hutchins, on the nature of sprites in Shakespeare's day.

The '-el' ending of Shakespeare's name translates in Hebrew as 'God', placing Ariel in line with more benevolent spirits, many of which were listed in sorcery books published in Shakespeare's day with similar suffixes. Jewish demonology, for example, had a figure by the name of Ariel who was described as the spirit of the waters. Another spirit, Uriel, is also comparable. In Isaiah 29, Ariel is mentioned as another name for Jerusalem. In the Geneva Bible, which Shakespeare and others of the time would have known, the entry carries an interesting footnote describing this Ariel as the "Lyon of God". Further descriptions of this Ariel as having the power to confuse and weaken his enemies with sounds and tempests increase the parallel.

The name Ariel might also be a simple derivation of 'aerial', though the character's abilities stretch beyond those of a typical air demon, encompassing fire and water demon abilities as well. Other scholars propose that the c. 1589 play John a Kent and John a Cumber contains a character which may have been Shakespeare's inspiration. The character, named Shrimp, is also an air demon controlled by a magician. A few scenes of the play feature this demon performing tasks nearly identical to those Shakespeare's Ariel performed. Since it is very likely Shakespeare was familiar with the play, it is possible that Ariel is based on Shrimp, but evidence remains inconclusive.

Though the actual source Shakespeare used has not yet been determined, it seems clear that Shakespeare's Ariel and his relationship with Prospero reflects more closely the Renaissance idea of a neutral spirit under the control of a magician than the religious idea of a sprite. Shakespeare, however, refuses to make Ariel a character without free will, infusing him with desires and near-human feelings uncharacteristic of most sprites of this type.

== Staging Ariel ==
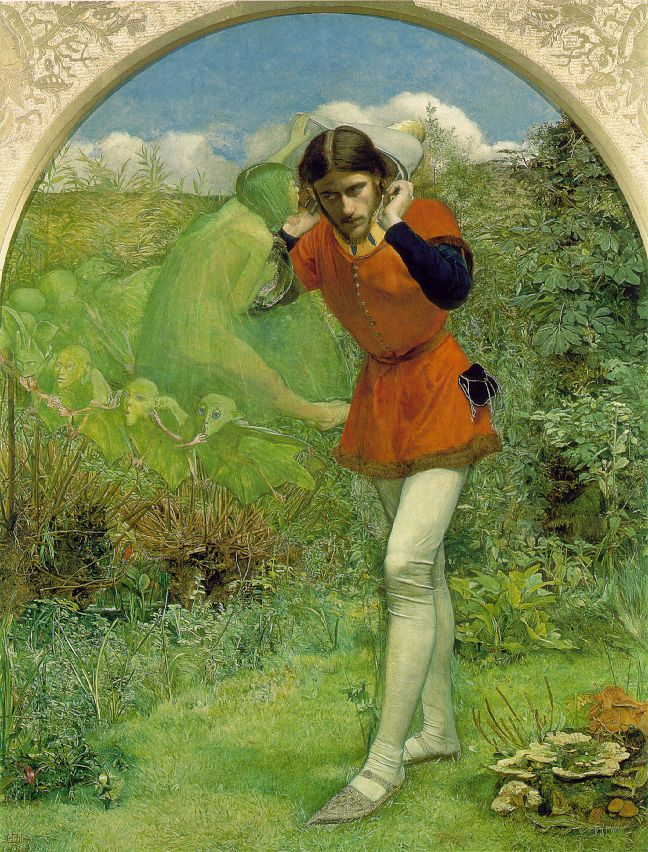
Ferdinand Lured by Ariel, by John Everett Millais, 1850

The text of The Tempest contains more stage directions than most of Shakespeare's plays, giving scholars an opportunity to see into the portrayal of characters such as Ariel in Shakespeare's time. In Act III, Scene III, for example, when Ariel, as a harpy, is directed to clap his wings on a banquet table, he causes the food to disappear by a "quainte device". Scholars have tried to discover just what sort of "quainte device" would have been used by the King's Men in portraying this scene. Ariel's actor would have been unable to hide the food himself, having harpy wings over his arms which cumbered movement. The actor would not even have been able to sweep the food into a receptacle behind the table, since the theatre had seating on three sides. What was needed was some sort of device to act on the signal of Ariel slapping his wings on the table. This device was probably a false table top which could be tripped by a boy underneath while the harpy's wings covered the food. When the wings lifted, the food would be gone, apparently by magic. Later in act three, when Ariel appears and disappears with thunder, another trick was probably used, involving some sort of basket on wires, covered in cloud designs, which the Globe theatre then had. Ariel may have descended from the air in this device as a harpy, spoken his lines, and ascended in the same device. Ariel may have descended on the back of an eagle, rather than clouds, or with no device at all—wires being attached to his harpy wings.

Later Act IV, Scene 1, Ariel says: "when I presented Ceres / I thought to have told thee of it / but I feared lest I might anger thee." Earlier in the same scene, Ceres, along with Iris and Juno, had appeared at Prospero's command in a masque. Scholars have wondered whether Shakespeare originally intended the actor for Ariel to cover Ceres' role, and give it away in this line. The need for a dual role may have been caused by a shortage of boys capable of playing female parts (boys usually played all female roles in Shakespeare's day). This changing of parts requires a change in costume, which explains a lot of Ariel's delay in scene four in carrying out Prospero's orders. Time is allowed for the character to change from Ariel to Ceres and back. On the other side, Ceres may have been associated, by Shakespeare, to the Kairos figure, related to rhetorics, personating the opportune moment to present the convincing argument in a speech. Early critics were sceptical of the idea, saying that "presented Ceres" could merely mean that Ariel introduced Ceres to the gathering. More recent studies, however, have revealed that, given the small number of boys travelling with the King's Men and the large number of parts for them to fill, there would have been little choice in the matter. The entire scene comes together in a way that leads scholars to believe that the Masque scene with the three goddesses was added as an afterthought to work around costuming and role-playing issues.

== Ariel's sex ==
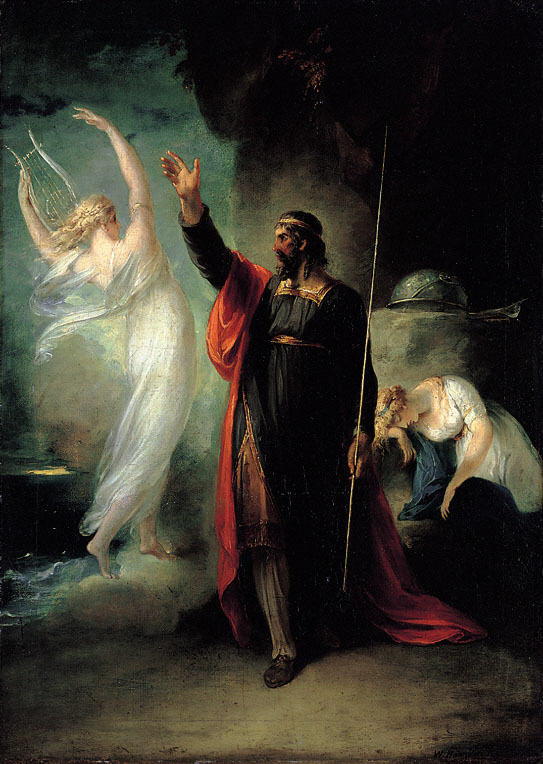
Ariel taking on an illusionary form, at Prospero's command, depicted by William Hamilton

In all textual versions, Ariel is referred to with the male pronoun 'his' twice in the entire play. One example is in the stage directions at III.iii.around 52: "Thunder and lightning. Enter ARIEL, like a harpy; claps his wings upon the table; and, with a quaint device, the banquet vanishes." The other gender pronoun used in the dialogue at I.ii.190–193, when Ariel responds to Prospero saying:

All hail, great master! grave sir, hail! I come
To answer thy best pleasure; be't to fly,
To swim, to dive into the fire, to ride
On the curl'd clouds; to thy strong bidding
task Ariel and all his quality.

Originally, the role would have been assumed by a boy-player, but beginning in Restoration adaptations, it would have been played by a woman. Since the male actor Leslie French played the part in 1930, the role has been played by both men and women. In the 2010 Julie Taymor film version of the play, Ariel is played by Ben Whishaw, but in that same year's Stratford Shakespeare Festival version of the play, also filmed and available on DVD, Ariel is played by Julyana Soelistyo.

In the Summer of 2013, Colin Morgan played Ariel in the Globe Theatre in London.

== In popular culture ==
- The character of Ariel, as played by David Haughton, appears in the 1978 film Jubilee as a guide for Queen Elizabeth I visiting Queen Elizabeth II's England. Jubilee's director, Derek Jarman, subsequently directed a film of The Tempest in 1979.
- Ariel appears in the comic book series The League of Extraordinary Gentlemen as part of the first incarnation of the group, Prospero's Men, alongside her master and Caliban.
- In the 1956 science fiction film Forbidden Planet, an adaptation of The Tempest, an analogue to Ariel can be found in Robby the Robot, a mechanical servant bound to Morbius, the film's analogue to Prospero.
- The novel series Théâtre Illuminata, by Lisa Mantchev, stars Ariel as one of the main characters, and he persists as so throughout the trilogy.
- Sylvia Plath's most famous book of poetry is the 1965 posthumously published Ariel. It is named so because she considered the poem to be the best in the book.
- Ariel appears in the 2015 second season of The Librarians. She is presented as a fairy, having been sucked into The Tempest by Prospero when Shakespeare wrote her into the play.
- Ariel is the origin of the 1900 namesake essay by Uruguayan author José Enrique Rodó.
