= Applicant =

Applicant may refer to:

- one who submits an application
- Applicant (sketch), by Harold Pinter, 1959
- "The Applicant", a 1962 poem by Sylvia Plath

== See also ==
- Application (disambiguation)
