= Plath (surname) =

Plath is a German surname. Notable people with the surname include:

- Aurelia Plath (1907–1994), mother of Sylvia Plath
- John Plath (born 1969), Australian rugby league footballer
- Max Plath (born 2001), Australian rugby league footballer
- Otto Plath (1885–1940), father of Sylvia Plath and entomologist
- Sylvia Plath (1932–1963), American poet, novelist, short story writer, essayist
  - Sylvia Plath effect
- Werner Plath (1918–1945), German swimmer
- Wolfgang Plath (1930–1995), German musicologist

== See also ==
- Plath GmbH, a German defence supplier
- Platt (disambiguation)
