= Poem for a Birthday =

- Genre: Poetry
- Publisher: Heinemann
- Publication date: 1960
- Media type: Print (hardback)

"Poem for a Birthday" is a poem by American poet Sylvia Plath, dated 7 November, 1959 and first appearing in the collection The Colossus and Other Poems published by Heinemann in 1960, by Alfred A. Knopf in 1962, and by Faber & Faber in 1976.

== Contents ==
"Poem for a Birthday" is composed of seven individually titled poems:

- "Who"
- "Dark House"
- "Maenad"
- "The Beast"
- "Flute Notes from a Reedy Pond"
- "Witch Burning"
- "The Stones"

== Background ==
According to biographer Caroline King Barnard "Poem for a Birthday" was written "during the fall of 1959 at Yaddo, following Plath's summer trip across the United States and just before her return to England." On October 22, 1959, Plath recorded in her notebook her struggle to develop the material that would emerge as "Poem for a Birthday":

Ambitious seeds of a long poem made up of separate sections. Poem on her Birthday. To be a dwelling on madhouses, nature; meanings of tools, greenhouses, florists' shops, tunnels vivid and disjointed. Never over. Developing. Rebirth. Despair. Old women. Block it out.

This notebook entry was made just five days before Plath’s 27th birthday. On November 5, Plath exalted: "Miraculously, I wrote seven poems in my 'Poems for a Birthday' sequence."

== Interpretation ==
"Maenad", the third in the series of poems that comprise "Poem for a Birthday", invokes the Maenad, in which the speaker "assumes the character of maenadic woman, frenzied and raging, throughout the seven-poem sequence." Here the maternal figure is indifferent to her offspring:

The mother of mouths didn’t love me.

The old man shrank to a doll.
O I am too big to go backward:
....................................
Mother, keep out of my barnyard,

I am becoming another.

"The Stones", the final poem in "Poem for a Birthday", was the last work of poetry Plath wrote in America, and marks an inflection point in her literary development. Ted Hughes, reflecting on Plath’s literary output, commented on the significance of "The Stones":

The immediate source of it was a series of poems she began as a deliberate exercise in experimental improvisation on set themes. She had never in her life improvised. The powers that compelled her to write so slowly had always been stronger than she was. But quite suddenly she found herself free to let herself drop, rather than inch over bridges of concepts.

Hughes adds that "The Stones", in particular, represents "the first eruption" that produced the poems that appear posthumously in Plath's Ariel (1965).

== Sources ==
- Barnard, Caroline King. 1978. Sylvia Plath. Twayne Publishers, G. K. Hall & Co., Boston, Massachusetts. ISBN 0-8057-7219-7
- Hughes, Ted. 1970. "The Chronological Order of Sylvia Plath’s Poems." in The Art of Sylvia Plath, editor Charles Newman , Bloomington Press, ISBN 978-0253104557
- Plath, Sylvia. 1981. Sylvia Plath: The Collected Poems. Editor, Ted Hughes. Harper & Row Publishers, New York. ISBN 0-06-013369-4
