= Kelly Marie Coyne =

American writer and historian

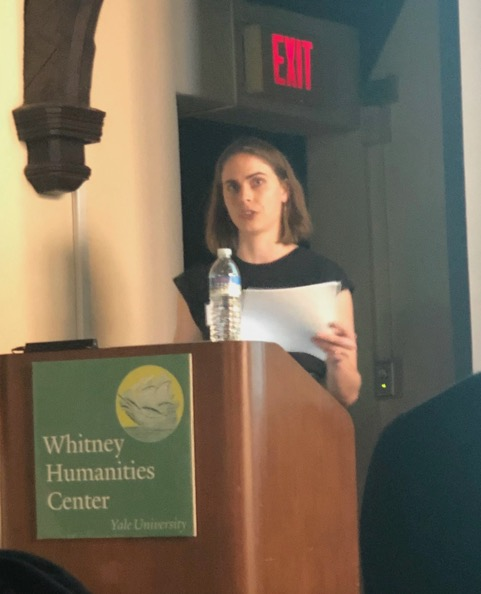
- Born: 1991 or 1992 (age 34–35); Boston, Massachusetts, U.S.
- Citizenship: United States, Ireland
- Education: Northwestern University, Georgetown University, Bates College
- Occupations: Writer, historian
- Writing career
- Genres: English, film and media studies, cultural studies
- Website: kellycoyne.com

Kelly Marie Coyne is an American writer and academic, recognized for her work on literature, film, and American culture. Her work has appeared in publications including The New York Times, The Atlantic, and The New Yorker.

== Education ==
Coyne earned a Bachelor of Arts in English and Psychology from Bates College (2013), a Master of Arts in English from Georgetown University (2017), and a Doctor of Philosophy in screen cultures from Northwestern University (2023).

== Career ==
Kelly Coyne teaches English and media studies at Hollins University, where she is assistant professor, and at Georgetown University. She teaches courses on literature, culture, and domesticity. Her academic work explores the influence of literary and cinematic genres on everyday life.

Coyne's first major publication, an excerpt from her Georgetown master's thesis, appeared in The Atlantic in 2018. The article connects themes of duality and a fractured self in The Bell Jar to Sylvia Plath's 1954 undergraduate thesis, "The Magic Mirror: A Study of the Double in Two of Dostoevsky’s Novels". Her scholarship on Plath has also been highlighted by the Poetry Foundation.

Coyne writes on contemporary domestic life, gender, and culture. A significant focus of her research is the phenomenon of "Living Apart Together" (LAT) and couples maintaining separate sleeping arrangements. Her articles for The New York Times and The Washington Post underscore a notable increase in these trends. Additionally, her work also explores topics such as shifting domestic arrangements, the experiences of stay-at-home fathers, and untraditional romantic comedies. Her essays have also appeared in Literary Hub and Los Angeles Review of Books.

In addition to her writing, Coyne has contributed to public conversations through media appearances, wherein she critiques cultural conventions and genre, examining how these influence perceived life paths, particularly for women. She questions whether societal prescriptions limit possibilities for personal happiness and relationships, and explores how evolving perspectives, such as those related to queerness, are shaping new understandings of domesticity. As a guest on Savage Lovecast in 2025, she discussed her research on sleeping separately, LAT couples, and the gender dynamics of domestic labor. She has also been interviewed on Good Morning America, Tamron Hall Show, NPR's Forum, the Girls Gotta Eat podcast, and other outlets.

Coyne is currently working on a book about changing domestic arrangements in 21st-century America, examining how couples and families adapt to contemporary social and economic conditions. She publishes the culture newsletter Guilty Pleasures.
