= Utility (disambiguation) =

Utility is a measure of the happiness or satisfaction gained from a good or service in economics and game theory.

Utility or Utilities may also refer to:

== In computers ==
- Utility, a software program for a limited narrow specific task: see Utility software
- Software tool
- utility (C++), a header file in the C++ Standard Library

== In economics ==
- Cardinal utility, a utility index that preserves preference orderings
- Marginal utility, the change in the utility from an increase in the consumption of a good or service

== In philosophy ==
- Utilitarianism, philosophical theories that deal with utility

== Other uses ==
- Public utility, an organization that maintains the infrastructure for a public service, or the services themselves
- Utilities (film), a 1981 movie starring Robert Hays
- Utility (patentability requirement), one of the requirements for patentability in Canadian and United States patent laws
- Utility (car), a term used in Australia and New Zealand to refer to a pickup truck or coupe utility vehicle ("ute")
- Utility player, a term used in sports for a player who can play several positions competently.
- Utility furniture, produced in the United Kingdom during and just after World War II, under a Government scheme designed to cope with shortages of raw materials and rationing
- Marine Corps Combat Utility Uniform, often abbreviated to "Utilities", the battledress uniform of the United States Marine Corps
- Utility Trailer Manufacturing Company, an American semi-trailer and refrigerated and dry trailer manufacturer, often shortened to Utility
- Utility Manufacturing Company, a defunct clock and camera manufacturer

== See also ==
- Application (disambiguation)
