= Fever 103° =

- Publisher: Faber and Faber
- Publication date: 1965
- Media type: Print (hardback)
- Lines: 54 (eighteen stanzas)
- OCLC: 671307485

"Fever 103°" is a poem by Sylvia Plath, dated 20 October 1962, and first appearing in the collection Ariel published by Faber & Faber in 1965, and by Harper & Row in 1966.

== Background ==
Plath struggled to find her theme in the material that emerged as "Fever 103°" Ted Hughes discovered an un-finalized manuscript that reflected Plath's attempt to grasp her thematic aims. The closing stanzas in these unpublished verses read:

Blanched and finished, I surface

Among the blanched, boiled instruments, boiled instruments, the virginal curtains.
Here is a white sky. Here is the beauty

Of cool mouths and hands, open and natural as roses.
My glass of water refracts the morning.

My baby is sleeping.

== Theme ==
Biographer and literary critic Caroline King Barnard refers to the "strumpet- spinster" theme evident in Plath's poetry, “powerfully and excellently expressed in"Fever 103°.” The tension is created by the contest between the spinster, who invokes “disturbing questions about purity and punishment,” and the strumpet, who “yearns for sexual abandon.”

Barnard discovers in the “rhythmic cadences” of the poem a description of approaching orgasm, only to be disabled by the “pure acetylene virgin.” The poem ends when the spinster “has finally gained control” and purity is achieved at the cost of death.

The poem closes with a phoenix-like rebirth:

I think I am going up,

I think I may rise—
The beads of hot metal fly, and I, love, I
Am a pure acetylene
Virgin
Attended by roses
……………………….

To Paradise.

Sylvia Plath, in a BBC reading of “Fever 103°,” introduced the work as follows:

[I]t is about two kinds of fire—the fires of hell, which merely agonize, and the fires of heaven, which purify. During the poem, the first kind of fire suffers itself into the second.

== Sources ==
- Barnard, Caroline King. 1978. Sylvia Plath. Twayne Publishers, G. K. Hall & Co., Boston, Massachusetts. ISBN 0-8057-7219-7
- Plath, Sylvia. 1981. Sylvia Plath: The Collected Poems. Editor, Ted Hughes. Harper & Row Publishers, New York. ISBN 0-06-013369-4
