= Elm (poem) =

Poem by Sylvia Plath

- by Sylvia Plath
- Publisher: Faber & Faber
- Publication date: 1965
- Media type: Print (hardback)
- Lines: 42 (14 stanzas)
- OCLC: 671307485

“Elm” is a poem by Sylvia Plath, dated 19 April 1962, first appearing in the collection Ariel published by Faber & Faber in 1965, and by Harper & Row in 1966.

== Background ==
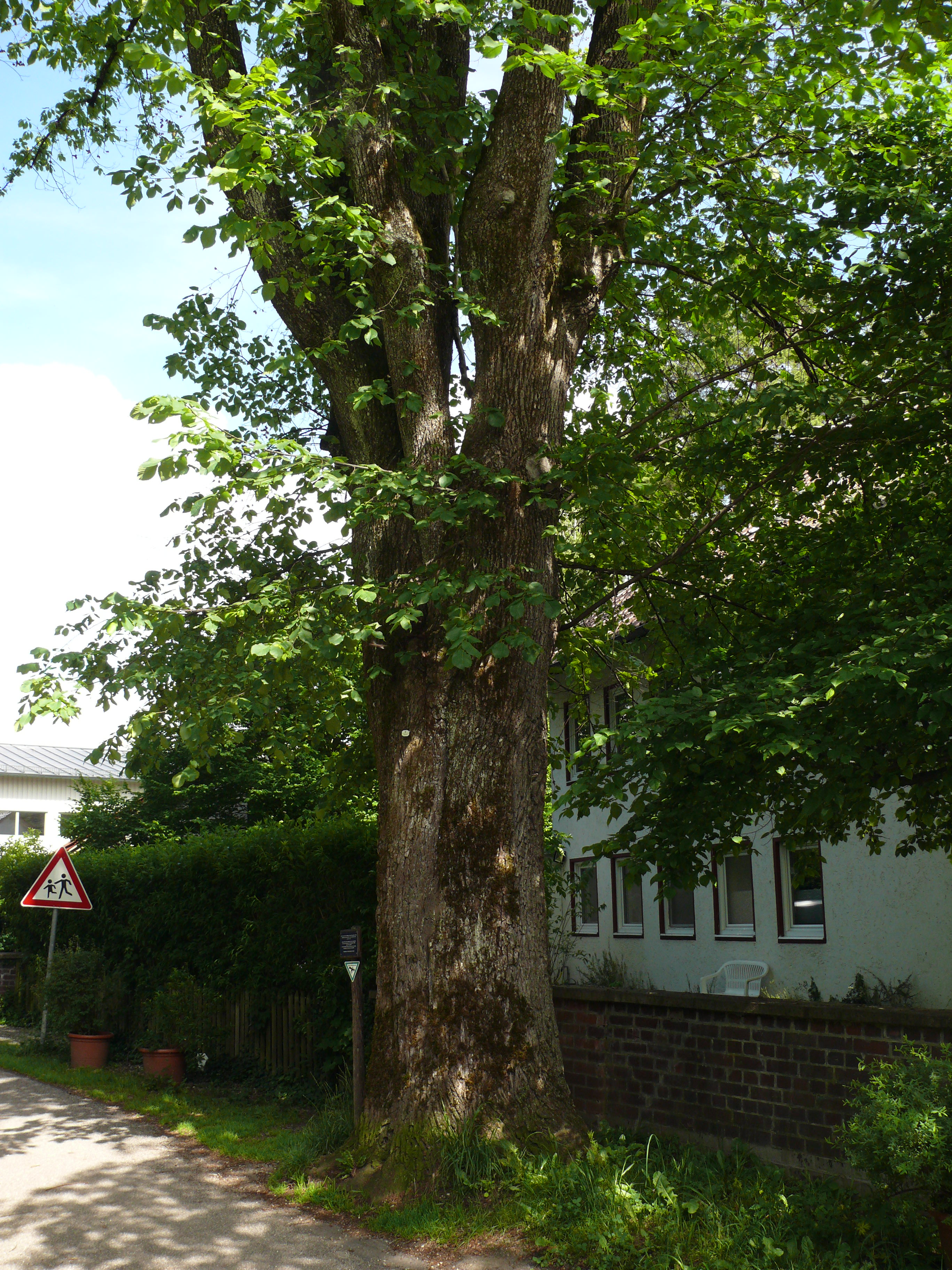
Wych-elm (Ulmus glabra)

The poem was written while Plath lived in Devon, England, on April 19, 1962.

“Elm” was inspired by an enormous wych-elm that shaded the Devon house, “growing on a shoulder of a moated prehistoric mound.” The poem is dedicated to Ruth Fainlight, a friend of Plath's who had suffered a miscarriage at that time. "It is your poem", she said in a letter to her friend. The painful experience brought back memories of Plath's own miscarriage the previous year, in 1961. In another letter, Plath wrote to Fainlight that she deeply identified with her because "I know how you feel", which is reminiscent of the first stanza of the poem ("I know the bottom, she says").

== Theme ==
“Elm” marks the beginning of the final phase of Plath's creative output before her death in February 1963. This poem, and the ones that followed, were written with an urgency that diverged from her formerly deliberate and measured crafting of each work. Biographer Caroliine King Barnard writes:

Abandoning her customary method of working slowly and laboriously with her thesaurus close at hand, Plath now wrote “at top speed, as one might write as an urgent letter.”

Bernard adds: “All of the poems Plath wrote in the last year of her life were composed in this way.” She offers a selection of verses from the last five stanzas of “Elm” to illustrate the “unmitigated conflict” conveyed in the work.

I am inhabited by a cry.
Nightly it flaps out
Looking, with its hooks, for something to love

I am terrified by this dark thing
That sleeps in me
……………………………………..

What is this, this face
So murderous in its strangle of branches —?

Its snaky acids kiss.
It petrifies the will. These are the isolate, slow fruits
That kill, that kill, that kill.

Bernard observes that “there is no letting up...no release whatever. The poet is indeed inhabited by her cry; her nightmare is real, and reality is the nightmare.”

== Sources ==
- Barnard, Caroline King. 1978. Sylvia Plath. Twayne Publishers, G. K. Hall & Co., Boston, Massachusetts. ISBN 0-8057-7219-7
- Plath, Sylvia. 1981. Sylvia Plath: The Collected Poems. Editor, Ted Hughes. Harper & Row Publishers, New York. ISBN 0-06-013369-4
