= Death & Co. (poem) =

1962 poem by Sylvia Plath

- by Sylvia Plath
- Publisher: Faber & Faber
- Publication date: 1965
- Media type: Print (hardback)
- Lines: 31 (six stanzas)
- OCLC: 671307485

"Death & Co" is a poem by Sylvia Plath, dated 19 April 1962, and first appearing in the collection Ariel published by Faber & Faber in 1965, and by Harper & Row in 1966.

== Background ==
The incident that informed the poem was a visit by two entrepreneurs who offered Ted Hughes, Plath's spouse and fellow poet, a lucrative opportunity to work abroad—a proposition that she resented.

Sylvia Plath, in a BBC reading of "Death & Co.", introduced her work as follows:

The poem is about the double or schizophrenia nature of death—marmoreal of Blake's death mask, say, hand in glove with the fearful softness of worms, water, and other katabolists. I imagine these two aspects of death as two men, two business friends, who have come to call.

== Theme ==
Biographer and literary critic Caroline King Barnard reports that the imagery of death takes various forms in "Death & Co.", one of which is "glitter"—"Bastard/Masturbating a glitter"—as it does in Plath's poems "Berck-Plage," where "things are glittering" as "As an old man is vanishing,' and in "Gigolo," where the narrator "glitter[s] like Fontainebleau."

Barnard includes "Death & Co." among a number of Plath's "baby" poems where infants appear as part of "an imagery of disintegration and death." The chiming of "The dead bell/The dead bell" commemorates the refrigerated corpses of stillborn babies in a maternity ward.:

He tells me how sweet
The babies look in their hospital
Icebox, a simple

Frill at the neck,
Then the fluting of their Ionian
Death-gowns,
Then two little feet.

== Sources ==
- Barnard, Caroline King. 1978. Sylvia Plath. Twayne Publishers, G. K. Hall & Co., Boston, Massachusetts. ISBN 0-8057-7219-7
- Plath, Sylvia. 1981. Sylvia Plath: The Collected Poems. Editor, Ted Hughes. Harper & Row Publishers, New York. ISBN 0-06-013369-4
