= The Disquieting Muses (poem) =

Poem by Sylvia Plath

- Publisher: William Heinemann Ltd.
- Publication date: 1960
- Media type: Print (hardback)
- Lines: 56 (seven stanzas)

"The Disquieting Muses" is a poem by Sylvia Plath first appearing in the 1960 collection The Colossus and Other Poems published by William Heinemann, Ltd.

== Background ==
"The Disquieting Muses" was among the eight poems Plath wrote in winter and spring of 1958 during a period of inspired creativity. Fellow poet and spouse Ted Hughes reported that she was writing as much as 12-hours "at a stretch ... too excited to sleep."

In a note referencing these "eight poems," Plath exalted at the quality of her recent work:

I think I have written poems that qualify me to be The Poetess of America (as Ted will be the poet of England and her dominions). Who rivals? Well, in history - Sappho, Elizabeth Barrett Browning, Christina Rossetti, Amy Lowell, Emily Dickinson, Edna St. Vincent Millay - all dead. Now: Edith Sitwell & Marianne Moore, the aging giantesses & poetic godmothers. Phyllis McGinley is out—light verse: she's sold herself. Rather: May Swenson, Isabella Gardner, & most close Adrienne Cecile Rich—who will soon be eclipsed by these with poems: I am eager, chafing, sure of my gift, wanting only to train & teach it—I'll count the magazines and the money I break open with these eight poems from now on. We'll see.

Literary critic Edward Butscher declared "The Disquieting Muses" the genesis of Plath's "artist self."

=== 1938 New England hurricane ===
"The Disquieting Muses" includes a reference to Plath's childhood in Winthrop, Massachusetts when a category 3 hurricane struck the area in September 1938: "windows bellied in / like bubbles about to break." Almost six-years-of-age at the time, Plath retained vivid memories of a storm that killed 564 people and injured 1,700. Winthrope and other communities suffered significant property damage.

== Theme ==
The Disquieting Muses (1916) by Giorgio de Chirico (1947 replica)

The theme and title for the poem is derived from the painting by Italian artist Giorgio de Chirico entitled The Disquieting Muses (1918). Reading the poem on a BBC radio programme, Plath explained the significance of the title:

All through the poem, I have in mind the enigmatic figures in this painting—the three terrible faceless dressmaker's dummies in classical gowns ... the dummies suggest a twentieth-century version of other sinister trios of women - the Three Fates, the witches of Macbeth, Thomas De Quincey's sisters of madness.

Biographer Caroline King Barnard locates the poem's theme in the familiar realm of a daughter's discontents with her upbringing - emphatically directed at her mother.

In each of its seven stanzas Plath registers a malediction. Barnard offers the first of the stanzas in which the disquieting muses appear at "the left side" of the infant daughter's crib:

Mother, mother, what illbred aunt
Or what disfigured and unsightly
Cousin did you so unwisely keep
Unasked to my christening, that she
Sent these ladies in her stead
With heads like darning-eggs to nod
And nod and nod at foot and head
And at the left side of my crib?

Barnard points out that despite its commonplace theme, familiar to daughters and mothers alike, "the strength of the conviction is not diminished by its lack of uniqueness."

== Sources ==
- Barnard, Caroline King. 1978. Sylvia Plath. Twayne Publishers, G. K. Hall & Co., Boston, Massachusetts. ISBN 0-8057-7219-7
- Plath, Sylvia. 1981. Sylvia Plath: The Collected Poems. Ted Hughes, editor. Harper & Row, New York. pp. 74–76 ISBN 0-06-013369-4
- Rollyson, Carl E. 2024. The Making of Sylvia Plath. University Press of Mississippi ISBN 978-1496846679
