= The Bell Jar =

1963 novel by Sylvia Plath

- First edition cover, published under Sylvia Plath's pseudonym, "Victoria Lucas".
- Author: Sylvia Plath
- Language: English
- Genre: Roman à clef
- Publisher: Heinemann
- Publication date: 14 January 1963
- Publication place: United States
- Media type: Print
- Pages: 244
- Dewey Decimal: 813.54
- LC Class: PS3566.L27 B4
- Text: The Bell Jar online

The Bell Jar is the only novel written by the American writer and poet Sylvia Plath. Originally published under the pseudonym "Victoria Lucas" in 1963, the novel is supposedly semi-autobiographical, with the names of places and people changed. The book is often regarded as a roman à clef because the protagonist's descent into mental illness parallels Plath's own experiences with what may have been clinical depression. Plath died by suicide a month after its first UK publication.

The novel was published under Plath's name for the first time in 1966. It was not published in the United States until 1971, in accordance with the wishes of both Plath's husband Ted Hughes and her mother Aurelia Plath. In the United States, the book became an instant best-seller, and has since been translated into more than forty languages.

== Synopsis ==
In 1953, Esther Greenwood, a 19-year-old undergraduate student from the suburbs of Boston, is awarded a summer internship at the fictional Ladies' Day magazine in New York City. During the internship, Esther feels neither stimulated nor excited by the work, fashion, and big-city lifestyle that her peers in the program seem to adore. She finds herself struggling to feel anything at all aside from anxiety and disorientation.

Esther appreciates the witty sarcasm and adventurousness of Doreen, another intern, but she identifies with the piety of Betsy, an old-fashioned and naïve young woman. Esther has a benefactor in Philomena Guinea, a formerly successful writer of women's fiction, who funds the scholarship through which Esther – from a working-class family – is enrolled at her college.

Esther describes in detail several seriocomic incidents that occur during her internship. In the beginning, she and Doreen meet Lenny, a gallant radio host who tries to seduce them, and who eventually dates Doreen. Another incident occurs with a mass food poisoning during a lunch thrown by the staff of a women's culinary magazine.

Much of the story is spent in flashbacks, where Esther reminisces about her boyfriend Buddy, whom she has dated more or less seriously, and who considers himself her fiancé. Esther's internal monologue often lingers on musings of death, violence, and the roles of women in her society.

Shortly before the internship ends, she attends a country club party with Doreen, and she is set up with a wealthy Peruvian man named Marco who treats her roughly. Later, Marco takes her outside and tries to rape her; she breaks his nose and leaves. That night, after returning to the hotel, she impulsively throws all of her new and fashionable clothing off the roof.

Esther returns to her Massachusetts home that she shares with her widowed mother. She has been hoping for another scholarly opportunity once she is back in Massachusetts, a writing course taught by a world-famous author, but on her return, she immediately is told by her mother that she was not accepted for the course and finds her plans derailed.

She decides to spend the summer potentially writing a novel, but she feels she lacks enough life experience to write convincingly. All of her identity has been centered upon doing well academically; she is unsure of what to make of her life once she leaves school, and none of the choices presented to her (motherhood, as exemplified by the prolific child-bearer Dodo Conway, Esther's neighbor, or stereotypical female careers such as stenography) appeal to her.

Esther increasingly becomes depressed, and she finds herself unable to sleep. Teresa, her aunt's sister-in-law, instructs her to see Dr. Gordon, a psychiatrist, whom Esther mistrusts because he is attractive and does not seem to listen to her. He prescribes electroconvulsive therapy (ECT); she is left awake during the procedure, and left fearful of ECT in the aftermath. Afterward, she tells her mother that she will not go back.

The ECT is ineffective, and Esther's mental state worsens. She makes several half-hearted attempts at suicide, including swimming far out to sea, and then she makes a serious attempt. Esther writes a note for her mother that she "will go out on a long walk", crawls into a well-hidden hole in the cellar, and swallows many of her mother's pills. The newspapers presume her kidnapping and death, but she is discovered alive under her house after an indeterminate amount of time.

Esther is sent to several different mental hospitals, where she is treated poorly as she resists their cold and heavy-handed treatment methods, until Philomena Guinea, her college benefactor, supports her stay at an elite treatment center where she meets Dr. Nolan, a female therapist. Along with regular psychotherapy sessions, Esther is given huge amounts of insulin to produce a "reaction" (a common – and later disproven – psychiatric treatment of the time) and, though initially promised that she would avoid the treatment, again receives a schedule of ECT. Dr. Nolan ensures that they are properly administered.

While there, she describes her depression as a feeling of being trapped under a bell jar, struggling for breath. Eventually, Esther describes the ECT as beneficial in that it has a sort of antidepressant effect; it lifts the metaphorical bell jar in which she has felt trapped and stifled. While there, she becomes reacquainted with Joan Gilling, who also used to date Buddy. The novel heavily implies that Joan is a lesbian and that she is attracted to, or interested in, Esther, who finds her strange.

Esther tells Dr. Nolan how she envies the freedom that men have and how she, as a woman, worries about getting pregnant. Dr. Nolan refers her to a doctor who fits her with a diaphragm. Esther is freed from her fears about the consequences of sex; free from previous pressures to get married, potentially to the wrong man. Under Dr. Nolan, Esther improves.

Various significant events, such as having sex for the first time, being hospitalized as a result, and Joan's suicide, provide her with a new perspective. Esther interacts with Buddy again toward the end of the novel when he visits her to ask if it was something about him that drove women to insanity, given that he dated both Joan and Esther. Buddy later wonders out loud who will marry Esther now that she has been hospitalized, effectively ending their commitment to get engaged. Esther feels relief at having been freed from many of her previous confines.

The novel ends with Esther entering a conference with her doctors, who will decide whether she can leave the hospital and return to school.

== Characters ==
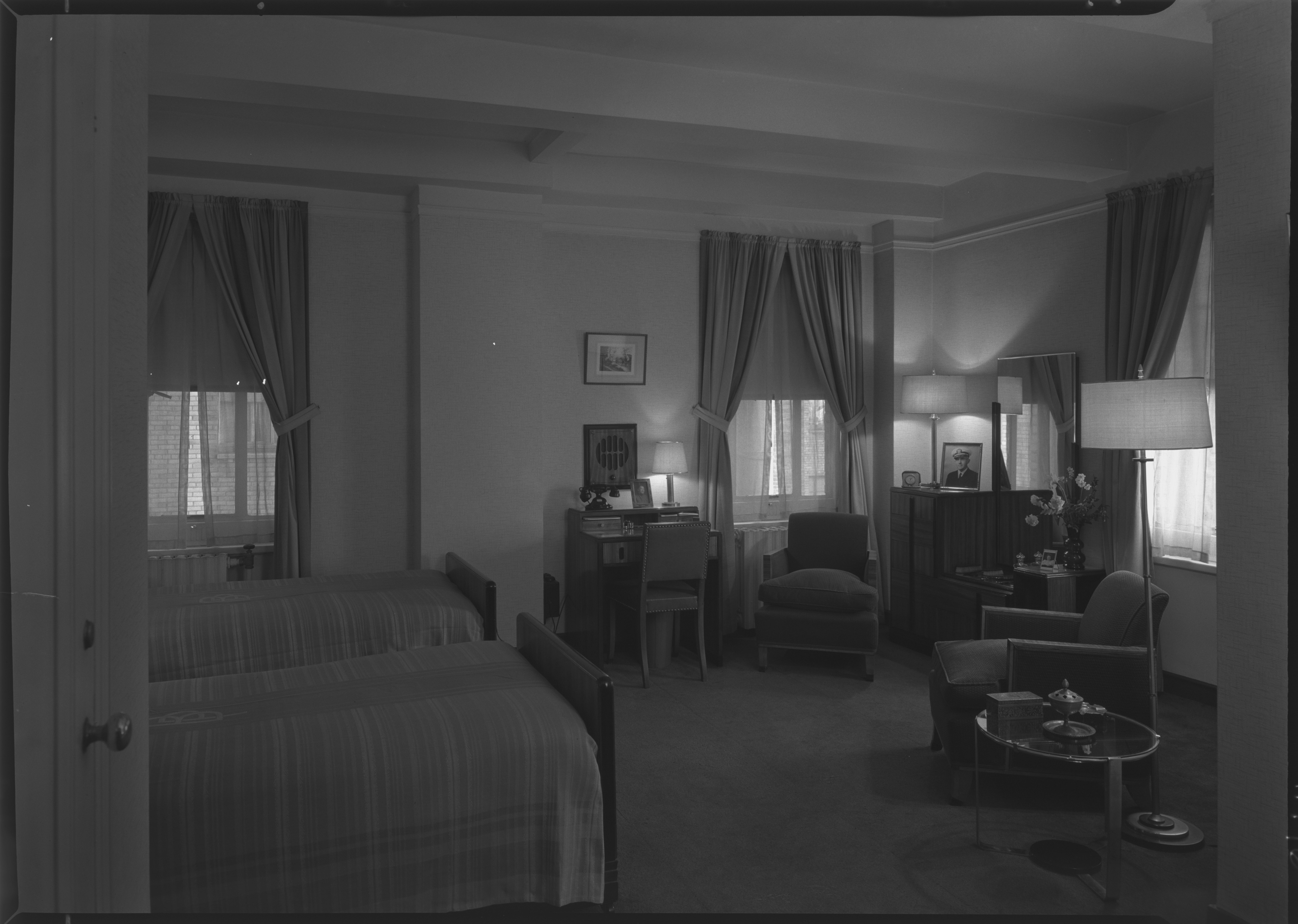
Interior of a room at the Barbizon hotel (1942)

- Esther Greenwood, the protagonist of the story, is an ambitious English major from Boston. Having won a summer job as a "guest editor" for Ladies' Day magazine, she lives at the Barbizon hotel (referred to in the novel as the "Amazon" hotel) in New York City, along with the other young women who were selected as guest editors. Esther experiences increasing mental instability during her time in New York and over the following weeks. Her realization that she has no idea what she will do after graduation, combined with professional setbacks, social alienation, the trauma of narrowly avoiding being raped, and the feeling that she simply does not fit into the culturally acceptable role of womanhood, escalate Esther's emotional state of fear and panic. Though it is not immediately apparent, unresolved grief at the death of her father when she was 9 also affects her. Having returned to live with her mother in the Boston suburbs, and experiencing increasing insomnia, loss of appetite, and an inability to read or write, she becomes fixated on—and later attempts—suicide. Before her precipitous decline in mental health, Esther was known as a hardworking student, with an impressive record of excellent grades and a history of winning awards and recognition for her achievements. With the end of that era in sight, Esther is directionless, having only a vague idea she might go into publishing or become an author and poet. This existential quandary results in increasing self-absorption, leaving her prone to feeling detached and tired.
- Doreen, another guest editor at Ladies' Day magazine, is a daring and rebellious young woman, and Esther's best friend in New York. Esther finds Doreen's confident personality and free spirit appealing but troublesome, as she longs to be free of society's constraints, but fears the possible consequences. Esther admires Doreen's appearance, humor, personality, and even smell, which she describes as musky and sweet, like freshly crushed ferns. Ultimately, Esther's fear leads her to reject Doreen and resolve to have little more to do with her, choosing instead to befriend Betsy, a prototypical "good girl". However, after failing to be accepted into her desired writing program, Esther impulsively writes to Doreen to ask if she can stay with her, but seeing the deterioration of her handwriting frightens her and she never sends the letter.
- Joan, an old acquaintance of Esther, coincidentally ends up in the same mental hospital. Joan also had dated Buddy Willard, but tells Esther later that she was more interested in maintaining a relationship with Buddy's parents, whom she idealizes as more concerned and caring than—and therefore, superior to—her own. At the hospital, she and Esther engage in a quiet competition to recover first, an apparently common situation among the patients. Upon abruptly entering Joan's room, Esther finds her in bed with DeeDee, another female patient. Esther then reflects on other women she has known who have sex with women, wondering what motivates them. When Joan later makes an ambiguous overture to her, Esther cannot figure out whether it was a pass or a gesture of friendship. In response, Esther tells Joan she never has liked her. Later, when Esther hemorrhages as a result of her first sexual experience, Joan helps her get to the emergency room. Joan eventually dies by suicide at the mental hospital. Esther attends her funeral.
- Doctor Nolan is Esther's doctor at the mental hospital. A younger, caring woman, her personal sensitivity and professional ability combine to make her the first woman in Esther's life with whom she feels she can fully connect. Nolan prescribes shock therapy and ensures that it is done correctly, which leads to positive results.
- Doctor Gordon is the first psychiatrist to treat Esther. Self-obsessed and patronizing, he subjects her to poorly administered electric shock treatments that traumatize Esther and utterly fail to help.
- Mrs. Greenwood, Esther's mother, loves her daughter, but is constantly urging Esther to mold herself into the societal ideal of white, middle-class womanhood—a goal for which Esther feels no desire at all.
- Buddy Willard is Esther's former boyfriend from her hometown. Studying to become a doctor, Buddy wants a wife who mirrors his mother, and hopes Esther will be that for him. Esther adores him throughout high school, but—upon learning that he is no longer a virgin—she loses respect for him and labels him a hypocrite. However, she feels compelled to postpone ending their relationship when Buddy is diagnosed with tuberculosis. He eventually proposes marriage, but Esther rejects his proposal, telling him that she has decided to never marry. Buddy immediately dismisses this idea, remaining unperturbed and cheerful.
- Mrs. Willard, Buddy's mother, is a dedicated homemaker with strict, conservative views about both the proper social roles for women and what constitutes sexual propriety. She is set on Buddy and Esther marrying. Joan loves Mrs. Willard and feels that she is the mother Joan always wanted and never had.
- Mr. Willard, Buddy Willard's father and Mrs. Willard's husband, is a good friend of Esther's family.
- Constantin, a simultaneous interpreter at the United Nations, is an acquaintance of Mrs. Willard, who sets him up with a blind date with Esther while she is in New York. His alluring foreign accent and sophistication are very attractive to Esther, who contemplates giving her virginity to him when they return to his apartment. Puzzlingly, he chooses instead to spend the night sleeping chastely beside her.
- Irwin is a tall but rather ugly young man, who is the first man Esther has sex with, an initiation that causes her to hemorrhage. He is a "very well-paid professor of mathematics" on the make, and invites Esther to have coffee when they meet, unaware that she is on leave from a mental hospital. Unfortunately, penetrative sex with Irwin causes Esther to hemorrhage, a rare but not unheard of occurrence. As a result, he hastily pays for a cab and sends Esther "home".
- Jay Cee is Esther's boss at Lady's Day. She is very intelligent and capable, so "her plug-ugly looks didn't seem to matter". She is responsible for editing Esther's work, which she does with a strictness that devastates Esther's self-esteem.
- Lenny Shepherd, a wealthy young man and disc jockey living in New York, invites Doreen and Esther for drinks while they are on their way to a party. They go together to his place. Doreen asks Esther to stay with her in case Lenny "tries anything", but Esther leaves. Doreen and Lenny start dating, taking Doreen away from Esther more often.
- Philomena Guinea, a wealthy, elderly lady, is the person who endowed Esther's college scholarship. Esther's college requires each girl who is on scholarship to write a letter to her benefactor, thanking him or her. Philomena invites Esther to have a meal with her and is taken with the student. Philomena had been committed at an earlier point in her life, and she insists on covering the cost of an expensive, private mental hospital for Esther, thus saving her from committal to a state-run institution. The inspiration for Philomena is believed to be Olive Higgins Prouty, an author who financially supported Plath before and after her stay in psychiatric care. Prouty struggled with mental breakdowns before meeting Plath, which may have been a direct reason for why she chose to pay for her scholarship.
- Marco, a Peruvian man and friend of Lenny Shepherd, is set up to take Esther to a party, and behaves misogynistically. Reflecting on him, Esther muses that "Women-haters were like gods: invulnerable and chock-full of power". He assaults her, and attempts to rape her.
- Betsy, another guest editor at the magazine, is a "good" girl from Kansas whom Esther strives to be more like. She serves as a foil to Doreen. Esther finds herself torn between daring to be like Doreen and wanting to emulate Betsy.
- Hilda, also a guest editor, arouses Esther's dislike with her callous attitude and cruel comments about the Rosenbergs as they await imminent execution.

== Publication history ==
Plath probably began writing the novel in 1961, after publishing The Colossus, her first collection of poetry. Plath may have finished writing the novel in August 1961, although subsequent changes were made in the editing process. Kelly Marie Coyne argues that Plath's undergraduate thesis on Dostoyevsky provides a structural roadmap of the novel.

Plath was writing the novel under the sponsorship of the Eugene F. Saxton Fellowship, affiliated with publisher Harper & Row, but it was disappointed by the manuscript and withdrew, calling it "disappointing, juvenile and overwrought". Early working titles of the novel included Diary of a Suicide and The Girl in the Mirror.

Upon publication in the United States on 14 April 1971 it became a runaway success, and featured in The New York Times Best Sellers List for many consecutive weeks.

Faber & Faber published an audiobook of the novel in 2015, read by actress Maggie Gyllenhaal.

== Style and major themes ==
The novel is written using a series of flashbacks that reveal parts of Esther's past. The flashbacks primarily deal with Esther's relationship with Buddy Willard. The reader also learns more about her early college years.

=== Womanhood and women's roles ===
The Bell Jar addresses the question of socially acceptable identity. It examines Esther's "quest to forge her identity, to be herself rather than what others expect her to be." Esther is expected to become a housewife, and a self-sufficient woman, without the options to achieve independence. Esther feels she is a prisoner to domestic duties and she fears the loss of her inner self. The Bell Jar sets out to highlight the problems with oppressive patriarchal society in mid-20th-century America.

Throughout the novel, Esther internally muses about sex, virginity, and the expectations on her as a woman therein. A major plot point in the later chapters is Esther being provided a contraceptive implant by a doctor, which allows her to lose her virginity without fear of falling pregnant and thus being expected to become a parent before her time. Earlier in the novel, Esther criticizes the double standard of the expectation that she remains a virgin for Buddy (who intends to marry her), whilst Buddy was able to have a casual sexual relationship with another woman earlier in his life without consequence.

Esther appears to take a near-scientific approach to sex and virginity. A chapter of the novel discusses Esther's plan to "have an affair" with someone, simply to "get it over with" (that is, to lose her virginity), but she is too fearful of the impact of pregnancy.

Esther also remarks about her fear of marriage and the constraints a "typical" marriage of the era would have on her identity and personal goals.

=== Mental health ===
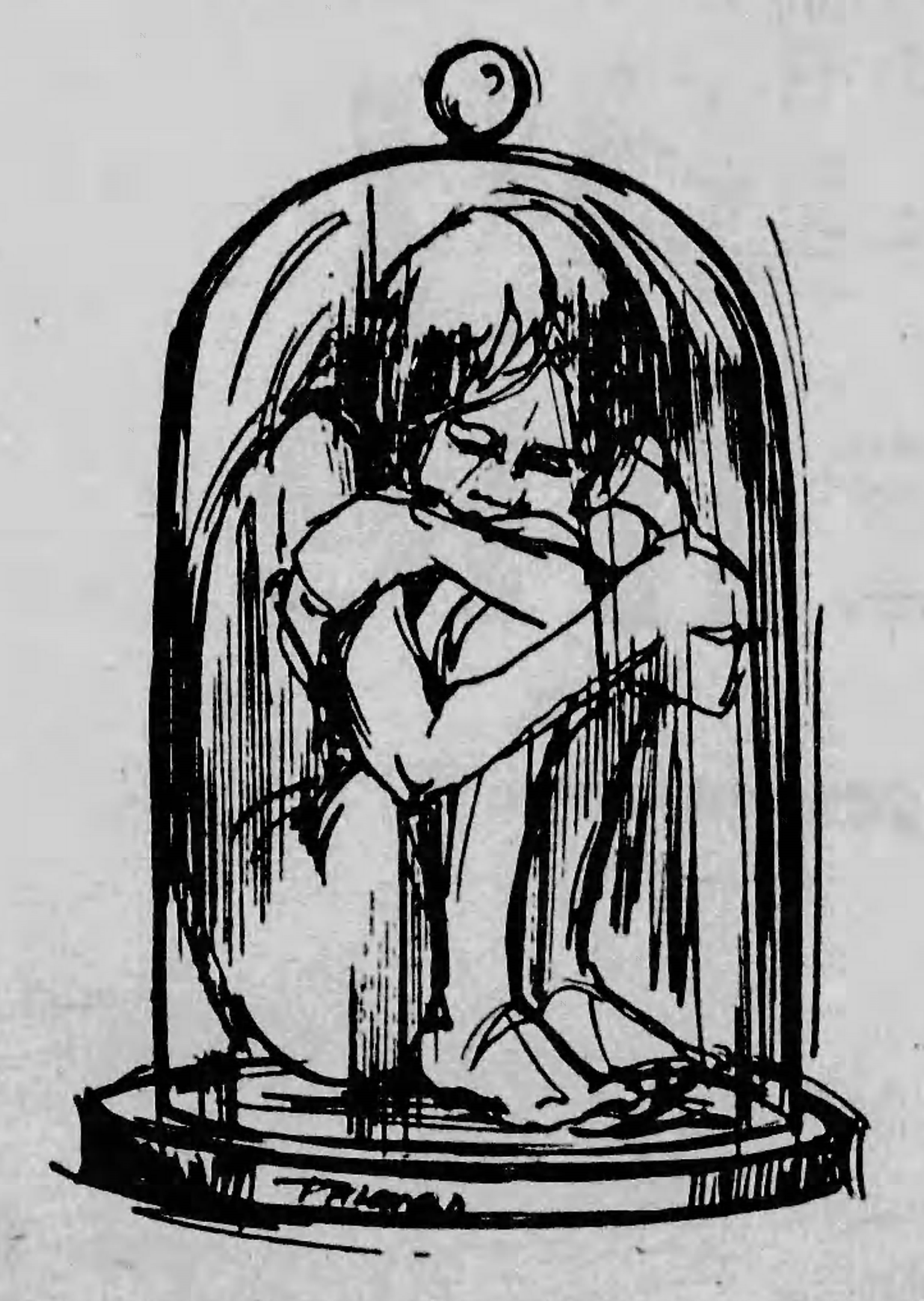
Illustration from The Cincinnati Post, June 12, 1971

Esther describes her life as being suffocated by a bell jar, a thick glass container sometimes used to create a vacuum space. Here, it stands for "Esther's mental suffocation by the unavoidable settling of depression upon her psyche". Throughout the novel, Esther talks of it suffocating her, and recognizes moments of clarity when it is lifted. These moments correlate to her mental state and the effect of her depression. Scholars argue about the nature of Esther's "bell jar" and what it can stand for. Some say it is a retaliation against suburban lifestyle, others believe it represents the standards set for a woman's life. However, when considering the nature of Sylvia Plath's life and death and the parallels between The Bell Jar and her life, it is hard to ignore the theme of mental illness.

Psychiatrist Aaron Beck studied Esther's mental illness and notes two causes of depression evident in her life. The first is formed from early traumatic experiences, her father's death when she was 9 years old. It is evident how affected she is by this loss when she wonders "I thought how strange it had never occurred to me before that I was only purely happy until I was nine years old." The second cause of her depression is from her perfectionist ideologies. Esther is a woman of many achievements – college, internships and perfect grades. It is this success that puts the unattainable goals into her head, and when she does not achieve them, her mental health suffers. Esther laments, "The trouble was, I had been inadequate all along, I simply hadn't thought about it."

Esther Greenwood has an obvious mental break – that being her suicide attempt which dictates the latter half of the novel. However, Esther's entire life shows warning signs that cause this depressive downfall. The novel begins with her negative thoughts surrounding all her past and current life decisions. It is this mindset mixed with the childhood trauma and perfectionist attitude that causes her descent that leads her to attempt suicide.

This novel gives an account of the treatment of mental health in the 1950s. Plath speaks through Esther's narrative to describe her experience of her mental health treatment. Just as this novel gives way to feminist discourse and challenges the way of life for women in the 1950s, it also gives a case study of a woman struggling with mental health.

== Parallels in Plath's life ==
The book contains many references to real people and events in Plath's life. Plath's magazine scholarship was at Mademoiselle magazine beginning in 1953. Philomena Guinea is based on author Olive Higgins Prouty, Plath's patron, who funded Plath's scholarship to study at Smith College. Plath was rejected from a Harvard course taught by Frank O'Connor. Dr. Nolan is thought to be based on Ruth Beuscher, Plath's therapist, whom she continued seeing after her release from the hospital. A good portion of this part of the novel closely resembles the experiences chronicled by Mary Jane Ward in her autobiographical novel The Snake Pit; Plath later stated that she had seen reviews of The Snake Pit and believed the public wanted to see "mental health stuff", so she deliberately based details of Esther's hospitalization on the procedures and methods outlined in Ward's book. Plath was a patient at McLean Hospital, an upscale facility which resembled the "snake pit" much less than wards in the Metropolitan State Hospital, which may have been where Mary Jane Ward was hospitalized.

In a 2006 interview, Joanne Greenberg said that she had been interviewed in 1986 by one of the women who had worked on Mademoiselle with Plath in the college guest editors group. The woman claimed that Plath had put so many details of the students' lives into The Bell Jar that "they could never look at each other again", and that it had caused the breakup of her marriage and possibly others.

Janet McCann links Plath's search for female independence with a self-described neurotic psychology. Ted Hughes, Plath's husband, suggested that The Bell Jar might have been written as a response to many years of electroshock treatment and the scars it left.

== Reception ==
The Bell Jar received "warily positive reviews". The short time span between the publication of the book and Plath's suicide resulted in "few innocent readings" of the novel.

The majority of early readers focused primarily on autobiographical connections from Plath to the protagonist. In response to autobiographical criticism, critic Elizabeth Hardwick urged that readers distinguish between Plath as a writer and Plath as an "event". Robert Scholes, writing for The New York Times, praised the novel's "sharp and uncanny descriptions". Mason Harris of the West Coast Review complimented the novel as using "the 'distorted lens' of madness [to give] an authentic vision of a period which exalted the most oppressive ideal of reason and stability." Howard Moss of The New Yorker gave a mixed review, praising the "black comedy" of the novel, but added that there was "something girlish in its manner [that] betrays the hand of the amateur novelist".

On November 5, 2019, the BBC News listed The Bell Jar on its list of the 100 most inspiring novels.

=== Controversy ===
In 1977, the novel was banned by the Warsaw Indiana School Board and removed from a "Women in Literature" course, on the grounds of profanity. This decision was upheld by a Federal Court of Appeals.

== Legacy and adaptations ==
The Bell Jar has been referred to many times in popular media. Iris Jamahl Dunkle wrote of the novel that "often, when the novel appears in American films and television series, it stands as a symbol for teenage angst."

Larry Peerce's The Bell Jar (1979) starred Marilyn Hassett as Esther Greenwood, and featured the tagline: "Sometimes just being a woman is an act of courage." In the film, Joan attempts to get Esther to agree to a suicide pact, which does not occur in the book.

In April 2007, it was announced that Julia Stiles would star in and produce the adaptation of The Bell Jar. She was supposed to play Esther Greenwood. Stiles attended the 75th anniversary Symposium on Sylvia Plath at Smith College and did research on Plath and her life. Rose McGowan was supposed to portray Doreen and Virginia Madsen, Esther Greenwood's psychiatrist, Dr. Nolan. In 2012, Stiles said in an interview that she let the rights to the movie expire because they never got the script right and did not have enough funding.

In July 2016, it was announced that Kirsten Dunst would be making her directorial debut with an adaptation of The Bell Jar starring Dakota Fanning as Esther Greenwood. In August 2019, it was announced Dunst was no longer attached, and Bell Jar would become a limited TV series from Showtime, starring Frankie Shaw, but the idea was abandoned soon after.

In March 2026, it was announced that Sarah Polley would write and direct a feature length adaptation of the novel starring Billie Eilish, with StudioCanal, Plan B Entertainment, and Joy Gorman Wettels producing, and Focus Features boarding the project as co-financier and U.S. distributor.

== See also ==
- 1963 in literature
