= Ariel (poem) =

Poem

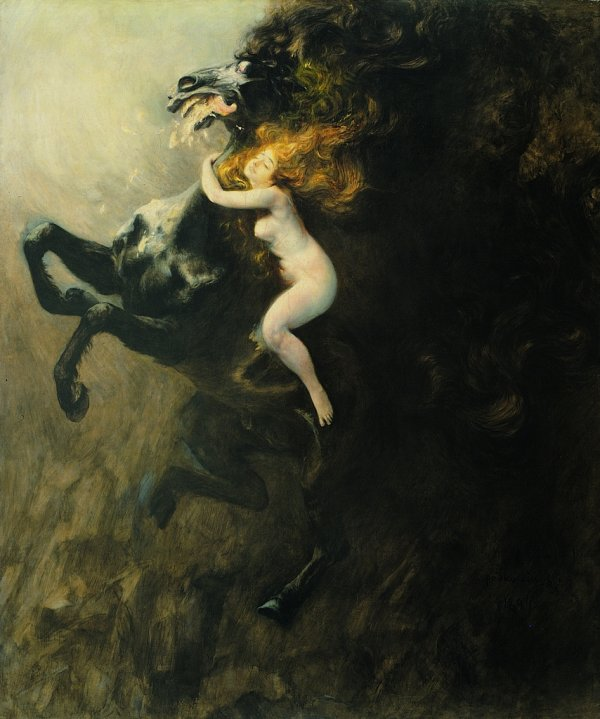
Frenzy (1894), a painting by Władysław Podkowiński, depicting a ride similar to that described in "Ariel"

"Ariel" is a poem written by the American poet Sylvia Plath. It was written on her thirtieth birthday, October 27, 1962, and published posthumously in the collection Ariel in 1965. Despite the poem's ambiguity, it is understood to describe an early morning horse-ride towards the rising sun. Scholars and literary critics have applied various methods of interpretation to "Ariel".

== Style and structure ==
"Ariel" is composed of ten three-line stanzas with an additional single line at the end, and follows an unusual slanted rhyme scheme. Literary commentator William V. Davis notes a change in tone and break of the slanted rhyme scheme in the sixth stanza which marks a shift in the theme of the poem, from being literally about a horse ride, to more of a metaphoric experience of oneness with the horse and the act of riding itself.

== Context ==
"Ariel" was the name of the horse Plath rode at a riding school on Dartmoor in Devon. Ted Hughes, Plath's husband, comments:

ARIEL was the name of the horse on which she went riding weekly. Long before, while she was a student at Cambridge (England), she went riding with an American friend out towards Grantchester. Her horse bolted, the stirrups fell off, and she came all the way home to the stables, about two miles, at full gallop, hanging around the horse’s neck.

It has been speculated that, being written on her birthday as well as using the general theme of rebirth, "Ariel" acted as a sort of psychic rebirth for the poet.

== Interpretations ==
=== Autobiographical ===
Plath had a ritual late in her life that consisted of waking up before dawn, writing poetry before handling household chores and other drudgery for the rest of the day. Literary critic Kathleen Lant argues this routine is outlined in the second half of "Ariel", beginning with these lines:

White
Godiva, I unpeel—
Dead hands, dead stringencies.

This stanza, she argues, outlines her pre-dawn poetry writing, for in the poem these actions take place before the sun has risen, and because she is interpreting Plath's poetic "undressing" as an erotic metaphor for her undressing the structure to which she adhered before Ariel and The Colossus. This is seemingly further supported by another critic who argues that by "unpeeling" these dead "stringencies" she is taking off the Latinate diction which she had previously characterized much of her oeuvre of poetry, which some have argued as an earlier attempt to define herself a poetic identity. Thus, in this stanza she begins to undress her poetry, and then, as she continues, Plath begins to reach her climax, and undergo a sort of poetic orgasm in the next lines:

And now I
Foam to wheat, a glitter of seas.

As she begins to fully thrust all this power and all of herself into these words and begin to form her new identity she becomes interrupted by her waking children, as portrayed in the next lines: "The child's cry/Melts in the wall." and from then on she begins to fly "suicidal" into the chores and drudgery that consumed the rest of her day, the "red/Eye, the cauldron of morning(/mourning)."

=== Feminist ===
The series of transformations she undergoes in this poem, as well as the actions she takes lend serious ground for feminist discussion. In the finale of the poem, as she builds up speed and tries to form herself a new identity, the i sound is repeated to represent the "I" of her identity:

The child's cry

Melts in the wall.
And I
Am the arrow,

The dew that flies
Suicidal, at one with the drive
Into the red

Eye, the cauldron of morning.

The words containing the i sound, cry, I, flies, suicidal, drive, Eye, all represent her thrusting her 'I'dentity into reality. From a feminist view point though, this poem is troubled. Earlier in the poem her "I"ness is repressed, for the "Nigger-eye" represents her "Nigger-'I'", for she is still repressed by her father or male dominance in general, as espoused in "Daddy". As the poem progresses, she begins a series of transformations out of this repressed self. First in the poem she becomes a stallion, a masculine image, the image of her repressor. Then as she picks up speed she becomes an arrow, a penetrating force which alongside her becoming "one with the drive", suggests she is transforming into the hegemonic figure, akin to that of her father in "Daddy", in order to reclaim her identity from the men in her life that tended to subjugate it. Finally though, she loses this identity and breaks down into water, which Freud (who she was read up on) defines as a feminine symbol, as well as being a purifying substance.

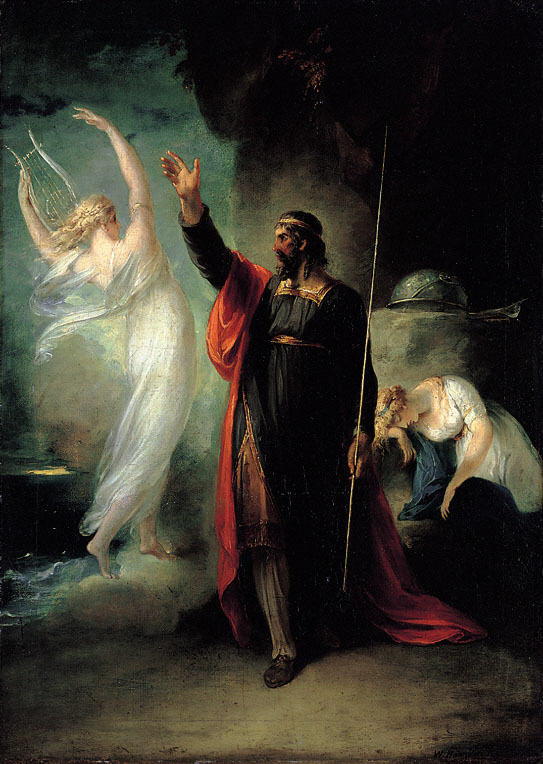
Shakespeare's Ariel (left and right) enslaved to Prospero (centre)

=== Psychological ===
As stated above, the final "I"'s of the poem represent her "I"ness building up speed and force as she attempts to create herself a new identity through her Ariel poems. You can take all the lenses, the autobiographical, the feminist, the Freudian, and all others, and put them together, and view them as her attempt to take all the parts of her, her repression, her anger, her femininity, her creativity, and all else and forcefully drive them into existence with this poem in an attempt at "psychological reintegration". The subject itself, Ariel, can be seen as representing several different things, all symbolizing a different side of her, besides Ariel, her horse, which she rode every week and which had become a part of her, they are:

- Ariel, Shakespeare's "airy spirit" an enslaved, creative spirit, representing her repression and creativity,
- As literary essayist William Davis argues "I refer to 'Ariel' as the symbolic name for Jerusalem" for "Ariel" in Hebrew means "lion of God". She begins the second stanza of the poem with the line "God’s lioness", which seems to be a direct reference to the Hebrew or Jewish "Ariel", the Judaic inclusion representing her "obsession with Judaism and the Jewish people". "Ari" (Lion) in Hebrew is also a synonym for bravery and courage.
- A stallion, as her attempt to become a masculine force further supported by a diary entry from the memoir of Laurie Levy, an associate editor of Plath's at Mademoiselle, which reads "S.[ylvia] thinks Ariel—animal power, fiery depths."

All these different Ariels representing different sides of her, the autobiographical references, as well as the feminist actions she describes, all are carried by the powerful "i" sound thrusting itself in the second half, driven into the dawn, into the sunlight, to try to create a new, unique identity, but ultimately fail to do so as she both evaporates into the sun as her final transformation, water, flies suicidal into it, and as the "cauldron of morning" represents all her specific identifiable parts all melting together into a uniform, homogeneous mixture in the cauldron of "morning".

== Critical reception ==
Literary essayist William Davis describes "Ariel" as one of Plath's "most highly regarded, most often criticized, and most complicated poems". The poem has been critiqued by numerous literary figures and remains immortalized as the title poem to her most famous collection Ariel.
