= The Moon and the Yew Tree =

1961 poem by Sylvia Plath

- Publisher: Faber and Faber
- Publication date: 1965
- Media type: Print (hardback)
- Lines: 24 (4 stanzas)

“The Moon and the Yew Tree” is a poem by Sylvia Plath, dated 22 October, 1961, and first appearing in the collection Ariel published by Faber and Faber in 1965, and by Harper & Row in 1966.

== Background ==
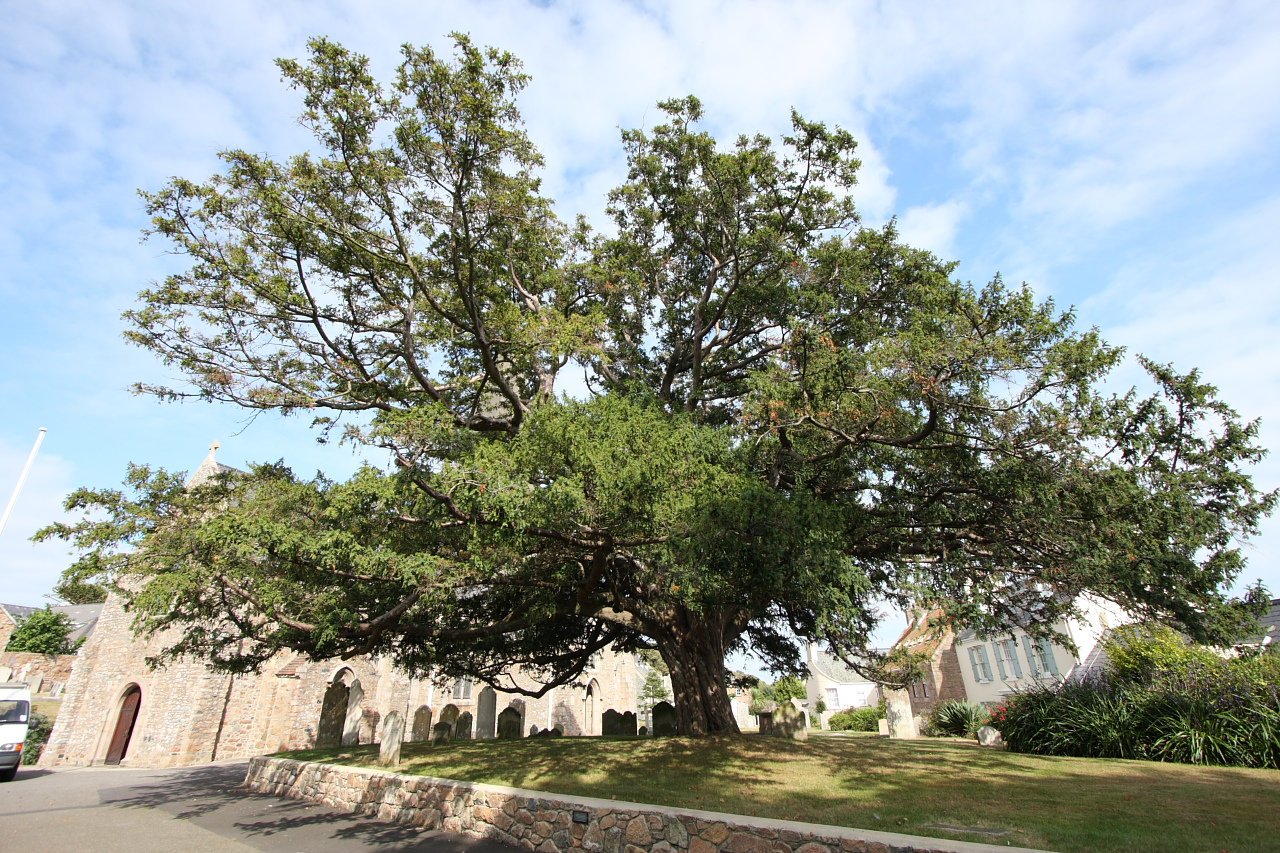
Yew tree

Plath composed “The Moon and the Yew Tree” while living with fellow poet and spouse Ted Hughes at his family’s estate in Devon, England. The poem was conceived as an “exercise” in which Hughes challenged Plath to respond in verse to the full moon setting over a yew tree in a churchyard visible from her bedroom window.

== Theme ==
Caroline King Barnard praises the “powerful subtlety of ‘The Moon and the Yew Tree.’”

“The Moon and the Yew Tree” is not a genuine “landscape poem” where the natural setting is identifiable. Rather “the external settings have become internalized so that they serve only as a functions of speakers peculiar or distorted vision.”

In a BBC broadcast where she read “The Moon and the Yew Tree,” Plath’s introduction explained how the tree became the thematic center of the poem:

I did, once, put a yew tree in [a poem]. And that yew tree began, with astounding egotism, to manage and order the whole affair…It stood squarely in the middle of the poem, manipulating its dark shades, the voices in the churchyard, the clouds, the birds, the tender melancholy with which I contemplated it - everything! I couldn’t subdue it. And in the end, my poem was a poem about a yew tree…

== Sources ==
- Barnard, Caroline King. 1978. Sylvia Plath. Twayne Publishers, G. K. Hall & Co., Boston, Massachusetts. ISBN 0-8057-7219-7
- Plath, Sylvia. 1981. Sylvia Plath: The Collected Poems. Editor, Ted Hughes. Harper & Row Publishers, New York. ISBN 0-06-013369-4
