= Théâtre Illuminata =

Young adult fantasy trilogy by Lisa Mantchev

- Eyes Like Stars (ISBN 0312608667); Perchance to Dream (0312675100); So Silver Bright (1250004853)
- Author: Lisa Mantchev
- Illustrator: Jason Chan
- Country: United States
- Language: English
- Genre: Young adult fantasy novels
- Publisher: Feiwel & Friends
- Published: 2009–2011
- Media type: Print (Eyes like Stars also in Audiobook)
- No. of books: 3
- Website: Author, Publisher

Théâtre Illuminata is a young adult fantasy trilogy by Lisa Mantchev. The books are Eyes Like Stars (2009), Perchance To Dream (2010) and So Silver Bright (2011). Eyes Like Stars was nominated for the 2009 Andre Norton Award for Young Adult Science Fiction and Fantasy and the 2010 Mythopoeic Award for Children's Literature.

The first book takes places in the mysterious Théâtre Illuminata "where the characters of every play ever written can be found behind the curtain,"—as written at the back of the book. The characters are bound to the Théâtre by The Book, a magical book containing the scripts of every play. Because of this tie, they are unable to leave the theatre. The protagonist is Beatrice Shakespeare Smith, more commonly called Bertie. While she herself is not an actor and is not bound to the book, she has lived in the theatre as long as she can remember and it is her home.

== Novels ==
=== Eyes Like Stars ===
Eyes Like Stars is the first novel in the Théâtre Illuminata trilogy.

Théâtre Illuminata is a theater where characters are born because of their role in a play. Everyone at the theater is a Player in some sort of play or manager of theater, be it a lead or chorus member. Except Beatrice Shakespeare Smith. Bertie has been at the Théâtre Illuminata since before she can remember. She has caused many damages to the theatre throughout her seventeen years, but the Theater Manager has been patient with her. Until she blows a cannon through the set and is asked to leave. Utterly shocked, Bertie convinces the Theater Manager that if she can move Hamlet into the setting of Egypt, sell out the performance and get a standing ovation, she can stay. Throughout the story, The Book that binds the Players to the Théâtre is captured by Ariel, an air spirit from The Tempest, who desperately wants freedom. Unable to rip out his own page, he rips out every other page and nearly causes the Théâtre to collapse. Nate, a pirate from The Little Mermaid, is kidnapped by Sedna, the Sea Goddess, in an attempt to save Bertie from her. Towards the end it is revealed that Ophelia, Prince Hamlet's lover from Hamlet, is Bertie's mother. It is also revealed that the true reason the Theater Manager did not want Bertie to stay was because she had the ability to free the players, which, in the end, she does free Ariel, and because he didn't want her to discover her past. At the very end, the two, along with the four fairies from A Midsummer Night's Dream, head out into the real world to rescue Nate from Sedna.

=== Perchance To Dream ===
Perchance To Dream is the second novel in the Théâtre Illuminata trilogy. The Seattle Times described the book as "about a girl growing up in a family that's part of "the enchanted Théâtre Illuminata," thanks to which she learns about every play ever written — and gradually discovers her own unusual writing powers."

=== So Silver Bright ===
So Silver Bright is the third, and final, novel in the Théâtre Illuminata trilogy. It was released on the 13 September 2011.

== Main characters ==
- Beatrice Shakespeare Smith (Bertie): Bertie, though not one of the Players, has always lived at the Théâtre Illuminata. She is strong-willed and rebellious. She loves coffee and a cigarette calms her down. At the beginning of the story, she is seen dyeing her hair blue with dye she stole from Mrs. Edith, the wardrobe mistress. Her bedroom is located on the stage (since there wasn't any room anywhere else), and, as a child, painted her bedroom walls (a set) despite the protests of the Stage Manager. She keeps the company of four fairies, Moth, Cobweb, Mustardseed, and Peasblossom, and a pirate, Nate. Throughout the story, she discovers that she has a way with words, and when she writes a scene, it happens the way she wants it to. She also discovers that her mother is Ophelia, from Hamlet. Both Ariel and Nate are after her attention. In the beginning, Bertie trusts Nate more and spends more time with him. However, by the end of book one, while Nate is a captive of Sedna, Bertie falls for Ariel. She ends up setting him free and tearing his page from The Book, knowing he didn't have to come back. He does, however, and says that when she tore his page from The Book, she chose him. The fairies disprove of Ariel and don't want Bertie being with him.
- Ariel: Ariel is the wind spirit from The Tempest. He is seductive and manipulative, and has the wind at his control. He is described as beautiful, with fair complexion. He's tall and lean and has long silver hair that tumbles over his shoulder. When Bertie is told she must leave the theater and is trying to find a way to stay, he tells her that she should be grateful for the opportunity to leave. He overhears Ophelia explaining to Bertie that if you pull your entrance page out of The Book you can leave the theater. Ariel steals The Book and attempts to rip his page out. When it won't, he rips out every other page, hoping the magic will weaken and he will be able to pull his own page out. The Théâtre begins to crumble, but Bertie is able to halt his wrongdoings and act the pages back into the book. In the end, Bertie releases him by pulling his page from the book and he helps her to be able to stay at the Théâtre by spreading word of her Hamlet performance. He comes back and says he chose her, and she chose him. Then they embrace and kiss, establishing a romantic relationship, which further develops throughout the second book.
- Nate: Nate is a pirate from The Little Mermaid play. Described as tall, with powerful muscles and tangled hair that he pulls into a plait back with a leather cord, Nate is the rooting power to Ariel's light, airy nature. He is superstitious and very concerned about Bertie's safety, and is shown to have feelings for her. He immediately backs her up on her plan to figure out how to find a way to stay at the theater and helps her convince the three managers (props, costume, and set) to back her up on the Egyptian Hamlet idea. The fairies much prefer Nate to Ariel, and enjoy mimicking his pirate talk (ye instead of you, so on). Nate does not trust Ariel, and gives Bertie a scrimshaw charm carved from the bones of Sedna to protect Bertie from him. He warns her to keep the bone from saltwater. During an argument he and Bertie get into, she gets so upset that tears fall on the scrimshaw and the Sea Goddess comes to collect Bertie. However, she can't because Bertie is 'his child,' and she takes Nate instead. He calls to Bertie in her dreams after he is kidnapped and Bertie desperately tries to pull him from Sedna's grasp; this has near-disastrous results.}
- The fairies: The fairies are Peaseblossom, Cobweb, Mustardseed, and Moth, characters from A Midsummer Night's Dream. All are tiny, flying, mischievous friends of Bertie, though Peaseblossom is the most responsible. Peaseblossom (often called Pease) is the only female of the four, and is the one to keep her three companions in check. She is not nearly as silly as the others (who mainly care about pie and sweets and like to make crude jokes at times), and is the most sensitive. They all distrust and despise Ariel and prefer Nate, who they often tease and joke around with.

== Reception ==
The New York Times included Eyes Like Stars in a discussion of fairies in young-adult books in 2009.

School Library Journal included Eyes Like Stars in an article about Young Adult books that feature fairies in 2010.

Kirkus Reviews gave Eyes Like Stars a starred review in 2009. They also favorably reviewed Perchance To Dream in 2010.
