= Lisa Mantchev =

American novelist

- Occupations: Author of fantasy novels and short stories
- Notable work: Théâtre Illuminata series

Lisa Mantchev is an American author of fantasy novels and short stories. She is best known for her Théâtre Illuminata series, a trilogy of young adult fantasy novels.

Her book Eyes Like Stars, the first in the Théâtre Illuminata series, was nominated for the 2009 Andre Norton Award for Young Adult Science Fiction and Fantasy. It was also nominated for the 2010 Mythopoeic Award for Children’s Literature. NPR selected the third book in the series, So Silver Bright, as one of 2011’s Top 5 YA Novels.

Her short fiction has appeared in Clarkesworld Magazine, Weird Tales, Strange Horizons, and Faerie Magazine.

Her first picture book, Strictly No Elephants, was published in October 2015. It was included in the CCBC Choices 2016 List and is the recipient of an NCTE 2016 Charlotte Huck Award for Outstanding Fiction for Children, Honorable Mention.

== Publications ==
- Eyes Like Stars, Feiwel & Friends, 2009
- Perchance to Dream, Feiwel & Friends, 2010
- So Silver Bright, Feiwel & Friends, 2011
- Ticker, Skyscape, 2014
- Sugar Skulls (co-authored with Glenn Dallas), Skyscape, 2015
- Strictly No Elephants, Simon & Schuster/Paula Wiseman Books, 2015
- Sister Day, Simon & Schuster/Paula Wiseman Books, 2017
- Someday, Narwhal, Simon & Schuster/Paula Wiseman Books, 2017
- Jinx and the Doom Fight Crime, Simon & Schuster/Paula Wiseman Books, 2018
- Remarkables, Simon & Schuster/Paula Wiseman Books, 2019
- Perfectly Perfect Wish, Simon & Schuster/Paula Wiseman Books, 2020
- Twisty Turny House, Simon & Schuster/Paula Wiseman Books, 2021
- The Trouble with Giraffes, Simon & Schuster/Paula Wiseman Books, 2025
