= Girls Gotta Eat =

- Genre: Talk, dating, sex, comedy
- Country of origin: United States
- Language: English

Cast and voices
- Hosted by: Rayna Greenberg; Ashley Hesseltine

Technical specifications
- Video format: YouTube
- Audio format: iHeart, Spotify

Publication
- No. of episodes: 389
- Original release: 2018
- Provider: Dear Media

Reception
- Ratings: 4.708333333333333/5

Related
- Website: girlsgottaeat.com

Girls Gotta Eat is a podcast started in 2018 and hosted by Rayna Greenberg and Ashley Hesseltine.

Much of the podcast is centered around handing out dating advice to the show's listeners.

The podcast is known for its live shows across the United States and its "Is This Weird?" segment.

Girls Gotta Eat has gotten in excess of 100 million downloads since its 2018 debut.

In June 2022, Greenberg and Hesseltine began Vibes Only, a sex toy company with its own mobile app.

Elite Daily described the show thus: "The two regularly share advice and hear from listeners about everything from f*ckboys to masturbation habits, and their no-holds-barred vibe has gained them a dedicated following of "snackheads," (i.e. fans).

== Critical reception ==
Hannah Orenstein of Elite Daily said "Equal parts raunchy and insightful, Girls Gotta Eat feels extra special because it acknowledges the most important love of all is the kind you have for yourself — meaningful romance and sexual escapades are the cherries on top."
