= Lady Lazarus =

Poem by Sylvia Plath

"Lady Lazarus" is a poem written by Sylvia Plath, originally included in Ariel, which was published in 1965, two years after her death by suicide. This poem is commonly used as an example of her writing style. It is considered one of Plath's best poems and has been subject to a plethora of literary criticism since its publication. It is commonly interpreted as an expression of Plath's suicidal attempts and thoughts.

== Structure ==
The poem is divided in twenty-eight tercet stanzas, and is written in free verse.

== Genre ==
"Lady Lazarus" and Sylvia Plath's poetry catalog falls under the literary genre of confessional poetry.

According to the American poet and critic, Macha Rosenthal, Plath's poetry is confessional due to the way that she uses psychological shame and vulnerability, centers herself as the speaker, and represents the civilization she is living in. Her husband, the poet Ted Hughes, has characterized her poems as having strong autobiographical elements, as well.

According to scholar Parvin Ghasemi, Lady Lazarus is written in "light verse containing the intense desire to die and be born; it is a poem of personal pain, suffering, and revenge". Light verse, in this context, refers to a Plathian style of writing. Ghasemi addresses this, by quoting English poet Al Alvarez when he states, "her trick is to tell this horror story in a verse form as insistently jaunty and ritualistic as a nursery rhyme". Writer Eileen M. Aird has said of Plath's writing style, "[i]t is clear that Sylvia Plath's description of 'Daddy' and 'Lady Lazarus' as 'light verse' is descriptive of a mode which contrives a highly sophisticated blend of the ironic and the violent".

== German identity and World War II ==
Plath describes the speaker's oppression with the use of allusions and images invoking World War II–era Nazi Germany . It is known as one of her "Holocaust poems", along with "Daddy" and "Mary's Song".

Plath was the daughter of a German immigrant, Otto Plath. According to Plath's biographer Heather Clark, as a child Plath was proud of her German heritage, but this began to shift during World War II, when she began feeling shame about her ethnicity. According to Clark, "Sylvia understood from a young age that the German identity she shared with her father was somehow dangerous—a secret source of shame".

=== Holocaust imagery ===
The poem makes several references to the Holocaust through imagery such as "Bright as a Nazi lampshade" and in the last two stanzas:

Herr God, Herr Lucifer

Beware

Beware.

Out of the ash

I rise with my red hair

And I eat men like air.

These stanzas address the deadliness of the Holocaust in general, Ghasemi writes, and more particularly the burning of dead bodies that occurred in the crematoriums at the concentration camps.

The scholar Tegan Jane Schetrumpf also makes connections to the Holocaust, stating that "Plath compares the merchandise of a miracle-performing saint to the remnants of Holocaust victims to emphasize that she is a relic of death, as postmodernist readers are relics of the Holocaust[.]" Plath biographer Clark has argued that Plath uses Holocaust imagery to designate a clear moral binary, while also distancing herself from her Germanness.

== Omissions ==
When compared to early manuscripts and the audio recording, the published version omits several lines of verse. When Plath recorded this poem for the BBC in London in October 1962, her version included a line after line 12 of the published version, "Do I terrify?" The recorded version goes on, "Yes, yes, Herr Professor, it is I. Can you deny?" Another line "I may be Japanese" follows line 33 of the published poem, "I may be skin and bone."

== References to the phoenix ==
The poem alludes to the mythological bird called the phoenix. The speaker describes her attempts at committing suicide not as failures, but as successful resurrections, like those described in the tales of the biblical character Lazarus and the myth of the phoenix. By the end of the poem, the speaker has transformed into a firebird, effectively marking her rebirth, which some critics liken to a demonic transformation.
