= Johnny Panic and the Bible of Dreams =

Book by Sylvia Plath

- Author: Sylvia Plath
- Genre: Short story collection
- Publisher: Faber and Faber
- Publication date: 1977

Johnny Panic and the Bible of Dreams is a collection of short stories by Sylvia Plath. It was posthumously published in 1977 as a collection of thirteen short stories, including the title story.

== Publication ==
The first edition was published in 1977. As more of Plath's work was unearthed down the years, a second edition was published with many new stories. The second edition is split into four parts, and includes many new stories, some of which were very personal to Plath. As Plath's husband at the time of her death in 1963, fellow poet and writer Ted Hughes managed the publication and distribution of all her unpublished works, including her poetry.

The English band Tears for Fears has a song named after this work.

== Contents (Second edition) ==
=== Part I: The more successful short stories and prose pieces ===
1. "Johnny Panic and the Bible of Dreams" (1958)
2. "America! America!" (1963)
3. "The Day Mr. Prescott Died" (1956)
4. "The Wishing Box" (1956)
5. "A Comparison" (1962)
6. "The Fifteen-Dollar Eagle" (1959)
7. "The Daughters of Blossom Street" (1959)
8. "'Context'" (1962)
9. "The Fifty-Ninth Bear" (1959)
10. "Mothers" (1962)
11. "Ocean 1212-W" (1962)
12. "Snow Blitz" (1963)

=== Part II: Other stories ===
1. "Initiation" (1952)
2. "Sunday at the Mintons" (1952)
3. "Superman and Paula Brown's New Snowsuit" (1955)
4. "In the Mountains" (1954)
5. "All the Dead Dears" (1956/1957)
6. "Day of Success" (1960)

=== Part III: Excerpts from Notebooks ===
1. "Cambridge Notes" (1956)
2. "Widow Mangada" (1956)
3. "Rose and Percy B" (1961/1962)
4. "Charlie Pollard and the Beekeepers" (1962)

=== Part IV: Stories from the Lilly Library ===
1. "A Day in June" (1949)
2. "The Green Rock" (1949)
3. "Among the Bumblebees" (Early 1950s)
4. "Tongues of Stone" (1955)
5. "That Widow Mangada" (1956)
6. "Stone Boy with Dolphin" (1957/1958)
7. "Above the Oxbow" (1958)
8. "The Shadow" (1959)
9. "Sweetie Pie and the Gutter Men" (1959)
