= Letters Home: Correspondence 1950–1963 =

Private letter collection

- First US edition
- Author: Sylvia Plath
- Language: English
- Publication date: 1975

Letters Home is a heavily abridged collection of letters written by Sylvia Plath to her family, mainly her mother and brother, between 1950, when she took up her studies at Smith College, up to her death in 1963. Sylvia Plath's mother, Aurelia Schober Plath, edited the letters and the collection was published by Harper & Row (US) in 1975 and by Faber & Faber (UK) in 1978.

Letters Home contains an introduction by Aurelia Plath, who adds bits of commentary and context throughout. The book provides unique insight into Sylvia Plath's mind, as her growth as a writer and as a woman is charted for more than a decade.
