= Aurelia Plath =

American associate professor of medical secretarial skills

- Born: Aurelia Frances Schober; April 26, 1906; Boston, Massachusetts, U.S.
- Died: March 11, 1994 (aged 87); Needham, Massachusetts, U.S.
- Spouse: Otto Plath
- Children: Sylvia Plath; Warren Plath

Aurelia Frances Plath (née Schober; April 26, 1906 – March 11, 1994) was an American associate professor of medical secretarial skills at Boston University, the wife of Otto Plath, and the mother of author Sylvia Plath and Warren Plath.

== Early life ==
Aurelia Schober was born in Boston to Austrian immigrant parents Frank Schober and Aurelia Greenwood on April 26, 1906. She had two siblings, Dorothy and Frank Jr., but grew up somewhat ostracized from her neighbors and peers due to her German heritage during the First World War. Her family struggled financially during the Great Depression due to her father's failed investments in the stock market. Despite cultural and financial challenges, Aurelia's parents prioritized her education, which fostered her development into a disciplined student and avid reader, culminating in her graduation as salutatorian of her high school class in 1924. She had hoped to attend Wellesley College but was unable to afford it. Instead, she pursued a liberal arts degree from Boston University with the intention of teaching English after graduation. She wanted to be a writer.

== Career ==
In 1928, Schober graduated with a Bachelor of Secretarial Sciences (B.S.S.) from Boston University's College of Practical Arts and Letters, opened in 1919 to prepare women for secretarial careers. Aurelia Schober was president of the college's German Club, vice president of its Writers' Club, editor-in-chief of the college yearbook, and class valedictorian. Schober received a Master of Arts degree in English and German from Boston University in 1930. Her thesis topic was "The Paracelsus of History and Literature". She married Otto Emil Plath in 1932 and subsequently gave birth to daughter Sylvia in the same year and son Warren in 1935. Otto Plath died in 1940. To support her children, Mrs. Plath took a job in 1942 as an instructor of medical secretarial skills at Boston University, attaining the rank of associate professor. Mrs. Plath taught there until her forced retirement in 1971.

In 1975, Mrs. Plath published her daughter's letters from 1950 to 1963 as Letters Home. Playwright Rose Leiman Goldemberg in 1979 successfully adapted Mrs. Plath's book for the stage, and the play's Paris production formed the basis for the French-language movie Letters Home (1986), directed by Chantal Akerman.

In 1977, Indiana University's Lilly Library acquired for its archives Mrs. Plath's collection of Sylvia's letters, childhood diaries and memorabilia, and early poems and stories. Mrs. Plath donated other papers to Smith College's Plath archive in 1983.

== Family ==
Schober's husband was Otto Plath. Their children were the American poet Sylvia Plath, and her brother Warren. Schober was also the grandmother of Frieda Rebecca Hughes and Nicholas Farrar Hughes.

Sylvia Plath, who committed suicide in 1963, made reference to her maternal grandmother by making "Esther Greenwood" the name of the heroine in her 1963 semi-autobiographical novel The Bell Jar. The relationship between Aurelia Plath and her daughter was a rather problematic and ambiguous one, for on the one hand they were exceptionally close to each other, and on the other hand Sylvia Plath often claimed that she hated her mother. Sylvia Plath portrayed their relationship in the poems "The Disquieting Muses" and "Medusa" and in the novel The Bell Jar. Aurelia Plath called the novel's characterizations of herself, family, and friends "cruel".

== Death ==
Aurelia Plath died March 11, 1994, aged 87, of complications from Alzheimer's disease in Needham, Massachusetts.
