= Daddy (poem) =

Poem written by American poet Sylvia Plath

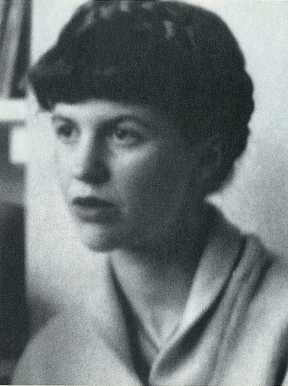
Sylvia Plath at twenty-eight years old sitting in her London flat during July 1961

"Daddy" is a poem written by American confessional poet Sylvia Plath. The poem was composed on October 12, 1962, one month after her separation from Ted Hughes and four months before her death. It was published posthumously in Ariel during 1965 alongside many other of her final poems, such as "Tulips" and "Lady Lazarus". It has subsequently become a widely anthologized poem in American literature.

"Daddy" employs controversial metaphors of the Holocaust to explore Plath's complex relationship with her father, Otto Plath, who died shortly after her eighth birthday as a result of undiagnosed diabetes. The poem itself is cryptic; its implications and thematic concerns have been analyzed academically, with many differing conclusions.

== Biographical background ==
Before her publication of Ariel, Plath had been a high academic achiever attending Cambridge University in England. It was at Cambridge University where she met Ted Hughes, a young Yorkshire poet, and they wed in the summer of June 1956. However, their marriage was short-lived as Hughes had been having an affair with another woman which caused him and Plath to separate. After her separation from Hughes, Plath moved with her two children into a flat in London during December 1962 and where "Daddy" was written. Shortly after, Plath died by suicide by consumption of sleeping pills and gas inhalation by putting her head in a gas oven on February 11, 1963.

Beginning in October 1962, Plath wrote at least 26 of the poems that would be published posthumously in the collection Ariel. In these Plath wrote about anger, including macabre humor, and resistance in "Daddy". Yet at the same time, she contrasted those dark subject matters with themes of joy, in hand with a deeper understanding of the numerous hindering functions of women. "Daddy" included humor and realistic subject matter that would, later on, be known as the "October poems". These poems were composed of Plath's anger as a woman who felt oppressed by her parents' expectations of her, society's hindering roles in place for women, and by her ex-husband's unfaithfulness. Plath's anger had been voiced in her later poems including "Lady Lazarus" and "Daddy".

== Description ==
=== Structure, form, and rhyme ===
Plath wrote the poem in quintains with irregular meter and irregular rhyme. The rhyming words all end with an "oo" vowel sound (like the words "through," "you," "blue," "do," and "shoe")

=== Subject matter ===
Sylvia Plath's poem "Daddy" had very dark tones and imagery including death and suicide, in addition to the Holocaust. Plath wrote about her father's death that occurred when she was eight years old and of her ongoing battle trying to free herself from her father. Plath's father, Otto Plath, had died from complications after his leg amputation. He had been ill previously before his death for around four years before dying from untreated diabetes mellitus. Initially in "Daddy," Plath idolizes her father, going as far as to compare him to God. However, as her poem progresses, she later compares him to a swastika and what it symbolizes. Plath alludes to her father being a Nazi soldier and in contrast, compares herself to a Jewish prisoner. In fact, he was described by Plath as a diabolical being, causing her constant fear. The metaphor Plath employed is a means of expressing her relationship with her father. Plath ultimately had feared her father and was terrified of him as those who were Jewish were terrified of the Nazi soldiers. She includes various references to the masses brutally murdered by the Holocaust and the destruction of war in her poem. She ends the poem by alluding to her marriage as a continuation of her trauma bond with her father and calling her father a vampire who had finally been stabbed with a stake in his heart.

=== Interpretation ===
Some critics have interpreted "Daddy" in both biographical and psychoanalytic terms. For instance, critic Robert Phillips wrote, "Finally the one way [Plath] was to achieve relief, to become an independent Self, was to kill her father's memory, which, in 'Daddy,' she does by a metaphorical murder. Making him a Nazi and herself a Jew, she dramatizes the war in her soul. . . From its opening image onward, that of the father as an "old shoe" in which the daughter has lived for thirty years—an explicitly phallic image, according to the writings of Freud—the sexual pull and tug is manifest, as is the degree of Plath's mental suffering, supported by references to Dachau, Auschwitz, and Belsen."

Critics writers Guinevara A. Nance and Judith P. Jones take the same approach of psychoanalyzing Plath via "Daddy". They essentially make the same argument as Phillips as they also write that "[Plath] accentuates linguistically the speaker's reliving of her childhood. Using the heavy cadences of nursery rhyme and baby words such as 'chuffing,' 'achoo,' and 'gobbledygoo,' she employs a technical device similar to Joyce's in A Portrait of the Artist as a Young Man, where the child's simple perspective is reflected through language."

The lecturer of English Literature at the University of Amsterdam and author Rudolph Glitz argues the poem could be interpreted additionally as a break-up letter. In some verses of the poem, Glitz mentions "Daddy" addresses another person aside from Plath and her father. The line, "the vampire who said he was you" Glitz argues is referencing Plath's estranged husband, Ted Hughes. Further suggested by the line in which Plath wrote "I do, I do" in and the "seven years" the vampire had drunk Plath's blood. Plath was married to Ted Hughes for seven years. In the very last lines of the poem, the vampire figure merges with Plath's father, "Daddy". Plath also writes before this merge, the "black phone" has been disconnected so that the "voices" could not "worm through," which Glitz also connects to Plath's discovery of Hughes's affair when Plath answered a telephone call from Hughes's lover.

Lisa Narbeshuber's essay "The Poetics of Torture: The Spectacle of Sylvia Plath's Poetry" displayed how several of Plath's most famous poems, including "Daddy", portrayed the female figure in opposition to male authority. Narbeshuber argued the objectified female form had been previously displayed was now confronting and renouncing the oppressive and social as well as cultural norms that dehumanized women. Narbeshuber went on to credit Plath for tackling issues of female identity that once silenced women. "Daddy", she argued, showed the female transformation of the 1950s into a "transgressive dialect." The bringing of one's private self into the public realm. The rebellious speaker in "Daddy" made the invisible visible and the private public. Plath dramatized her imprisonment and fantasized about defeating her tormentors through the means of killing them. Plath identified with the persecuted Jews, the marginalized and the hidden, as her body had been stolen from her and divided into articles belonging to the Nazis to do as they wished with them. With that said, Narbeshuber argued Plath had been trying to assume herself and not succumb to the stress that was imposed on the female body.

== Critical reception ==
Critic George Steiner referred to "Daddy" as "the Guernica of modern poetry", arguing that it "achieves the classic art of generalization, translating a private, obviously intolerable hurt into a code of plain statement, of instantaneously public images which concern us all".

Adam Kirsch has written that some of Plath's works, like "Daddy", are self-mythologizing and suggests that readers should not interpret the poem as a strictly "confessional", autobiographical poem about her actual father. Sylvia Plath herself also did not describe the poem in autobiographical terms. When she introduced the poem for a BBC radio reading shortly before her suicide, she described the piece in the third person, stating that the poem was about "a girl with an Electra complex [whose] father died while she thought he was God. Her case is complicated by the fact that her father was also a Nazi and her mother very possibly part Jewish. In the daughter the two strains marry and paralyze each other – she has to act out the awful little allegory once over before she is free of it."

Jacqueline Shea Murphy wrote the essay "'This Holocaust I Walk In': Consuming Violence in Sylvia Plath's Poetry", in which she argued that "Daddy" was an example of the fall of violent authoritative control over Plath's body. Murphy further defined that the particular fall was not just in reference to Plath's body but the fall of the violent control of numerous bodies throughout history. The violent control of various bodies as dramatized in "Daddy" portrayed the transformation of said bodies as representatives of oppression. The speaker of "Daddy," moved from the position of the oppressed to the position of the oppressor. The oppressed in "Daddy" being the Jewish people due to their torment in the death camps. The oppressor was one capable of killing as well as committing the torment. "Daddy, I have had to kill you," says the speaker who describes herself as "maybe a bit of a Jew" and whose father was a Nazi. Murphy emphasized that Plath spoke of the division between either being oppressed or oppressing, being controlled or control, and being mutilated or mutilate. Murphy argued Plath was referring to the survival of the fittest while simultaneously exposing the party in power. Murphy also claimed that Plath had been protesting the patriarchy's ways of obtaining power and authority. The power struggles throughout "Daddy" appeared to be explicitly gendered as the speaker is generally female and spoke out to expose and get back at men. The mentioned metaphors of oppression were used to describe the power struggles prevalent throughout "Daddy". Murphy explained that the power structure would remain intact, yet Plath imagined herself being the one in control and tormenting her tormentors. According to Murphy, Plath emphasized the power of the oppressed, the mutilated body, as she recognized the oppressor was entirely dependent on the oppressed. The mutilated, oppressed bodies were as important and as a result become the authoritative figure to be read.

In 1981, New Formalist poet R.S. Gwynn published The Narcissiad, which literary critic Robert McPhillips later dubbed, "a Popean mock epic lambasting contemporary poets". In The Narcissiad, Gwynn parodied both the clichés, excesses, and legacy of Sylvia Plath's confessional poetry in the following words:

"Our Younger Poet, weaned early from his bottle,
Begins to cast about for a role-model
And lacking knowledge of the great tradition,
Pulls from the bookstore shelf a slim edition
Of Poems of Now, and takes the offered bait,
And thus becomes the next initiate.
If male he takes his starting point from Lowell
And fearlessly parades his suffering soul
Through therapy, shock-treatments, and divorce
Until he whips the skin from a dead horse.
His female counterpart descends from Plath
And wanders down a self-destructive path
Laying the blame on Daddy while she guides
Her readers to their template suicides --
Forgetting in her addled state, alas,
Her all-electric oven has no gas."
