= Ariel (poetry collection) =

Poetry book by Sylvia Plath

- First edition cover
- Author: Sylvia Plath
- Genre: Poetry
- Publisher: Faber and Faber
- Publication date: 1965
- Publication place: United Kingdom
- Pages: 85 (Harper & Row first edition)
- ISBN: 0060908904

Ariel is Sylvia Plath's second collection of poetry. It was first released in 1965, two years after her death by suicide. The poems of Ariel, with their free-flowing images and characteristically menacing psychic landscapes, marked a dramatic turn from Plath's earlier Colossus poems.

Ted Hughes, Plath's widower and the editor of Ariel, made substantial changes to her intended plan for the collection by changing her ordering of the poems, dropping some pieces, and adding others. The first American edition was published in 1966 and included an introduction by the poet Robert Lowell; in a prior BBC interview, Plath had cited Lowell's book Life Studies as having had a profound influence over the poetry she was writing in the last phase of her writing career. In the same interview, Plath also cited the poet Anne Sexton as an important influence on her writing during that time, since Sexton was also exploring some of the same dark, taboo, personal subject matter that Plath was exploring in her writing.

In 2004, a new edition of Ariel was published which for the first time restored the selection and arrangement of the poems as Plath had left them. The 2004 edition also features a foreword by Frieda Hughes, the daughter of Plath and Hughes.

== Contents ==
=== 1965 version ===
Poems marked with an * were not in Plath's original manuscript, but were added by Ted Hughes. Most of them date from the last few weeks of Plath's life.

1. "Morning Song"
2. "The Couriers"
3. "Sheep in Fog" *
4. "The Applicant"
5. "Lady Lazarus"
6. "Tulips"
7. "Cut"
8. "Elm"
9. "The Night Dances"
10. "Poppies in October"
11. "Berck-Plage"
12. "Ariel"
13. "Death & Co."
14. "Lesbos" (censored in some publications, not included in UK version)
15. "Nick and the Candlestick"
16. "Gulliver"
17. "Getting There"
18. "Medusa"
19. "The Moon and the Yew Tree"
20. "A Birthday Present"
21. "Mary's Song" * (only in US version)
22. "Letter in November"
23. "The Rival"
24. "Daddy"
25. "You're"
26. "Fever 103°"
27. "The Bee Meeting"
28. "The Arrival of the Bee Box"
29. "Stings"
30. "The Swarm" * (only in US version)
31. "Wintering"
32. "The Hanging Man" *
33. "Little Fugue" *
34. "Years" *
35. "The Munich Mannequins" *
36. "Totem" *
37. "Paralytic" *
38. "Balloons" *
39. "Poppies in July" *
40. "Kindness" *
41. "Contusion" *
42. "Edge" *
43. "Words" *

=== Manuscript version / Restored 2004 version ===
Poems marked with an ** were included in Plath's original manuscript, but were removed by Ted Hughes.

1. "Morning Song"
2. "The Couriers"
3. "The Rabbit Catcher" **
4. "Thalidomide" **
5. "The Applicant"
6. "Barren Woman" **
7. "Lady Lazarus"
8. "Tulips"
9. "A Secret" **
10. "The Jailor" **
11. "Cut"
12. "Elm"
13. "The Night Dances"
14. "The Detective" **
15. "Ariel"
16. "Death & Co."
17. "Magi" **
18. "Lesbos"
19. "The Other" **
20. "Stopped Dead" **
21. "Poppies in October"
22. "The Courage of Shutting-Up" **
23. "Nick and the Candlestick"
24. "Berck-Plage"
25. "Gulliver"
26. "Getting There"
27. "Medusa"
28. "Purdah" **
29. "The Moon and the Yew Tree"
30. "A Birthday Present"
31. "Letter in November"
32. "Amnesiac" **
33. "The Rival"
34. "Daddy"
35. "You're"
36. "Fever 103°"
37. "The Bee Meeting"
38. "The Arrival of the Bee Box"
39. "Stings"
40. "Wintering"

== Title ==
The collection had different working titles, such as The Rival, A Birthday Present, and Daddy. Plath finally settled upon Ariel, her choice inspired partly by a character's name in Shakespeare's The Tempest as well as the name of her horse that she used to ride in England.

== Reception ==
American poetry scholar Marjorie Perloff said in her article "The Two Ariels: The (Re)making of the Sylvia Plath Canon" that "The fact remains that Plath herself had arranged the future Ariel poems 'in a careful sequence,' plotting out every detail including the first and last words of the volume." Another critic remarked that "her poetry would have been valuable no matter what she had written about". In 2016, The Guardian ranked Ariel as the 17th best nonfiction book of all time.

== Awards ==
- 1982 – Pulitzer Prize for Poetry
