= The Munich Mannequins =

Sylvia Plath poem

"The Munich Mannequins" is a poem by Sylvia Plath which recounts Plath's experience of insomnia on a trip to the title German city. The poem is famous for its opening line and for referring to conservative Munich as the "morgue between Paris and Rome."

== Style and structure ==
The poem is written in 13 couplets, ending with a single one-line stanza, and follows no rhyme scheme.

== Context ==
In the early 1960s, the fashion models were often referred to as "mannequins," and those from Germany enjoyed special popularity. "The Munich Mannequins" was written in little over a month before her suicide, making it one of her Ariel poems.

== Interpretation ==
In "The Munich Mannequins" Plath refers to the lives of women and how they are seen by others, specifically with regard to how biological functions related to childbearing are perceived to define them. The first line of the poem, "Perfection is terrible, it cannot have children," refers both to the appearance of the culturally ubiquitous live German models and that of inanimate mannequins. Just as mannequins cannot procreate, nor can their live counterparts risk their "perfection" by becoming pregnant. Plath suggests that perfection itself "tamps the womb," and goes on to describe the emotions she associates with menstruation, the cycles of menstruation symbolized by the moon.

Literary critic Pamela J. Annas argues "The Munich Mannequins" describes "particularly well the social landscape within which the "I" of Sylvia Plath's poems is trapped". She supports this ultimately through highlighting the domination of the artificial (mannequins) over the real (women) and the male society's transformation of women into puppets, and unnatural figures, representing their "disgust with" and "fear of women". She goes on to say that the winter setting in Plath's nature-themed poems represent a period of hibernation before spring and rebirth, while in the context of this city poem, a harsher, social, male-dominated setting, the winter setting represents death instead.
