= Otto Plath =

American entomologist

- Plath in 1930
- Born: Otto Emil Plath; April 13, 1885; Grabow, Germany
- Died: November 5, 1940 (aged 55); Winthrop, Massachusetts, United States
- Resting place: Winthrop Cemetery, Winthrop, Massachusetts
- Citizenship: United States
- Education: Northwestern College (Wisconsin), University of Washington, Harvard University
- Occupations: Author, entomologist
- Spouse: Aurelia Schober
- Children: Sylvia Plath; Warren Plath

Otto Emil Plath (April 13, 1885 – November 5, 1940) was a German-American writer, academic, and biologist. Plath worked as a professor of biology and German language at Boston University and as an entomologist, with a specific expertise on bumblebees. He was the father of American poet Sylvia Plath and Warren Plath, and the husband of Aurelia Plath. He wrote the 1934 book Bumblebees and Their Ways. He is notable for being the subject of "Daddy", one of his daughter's most well-known poems.

== Early life ==
Otto Emil Plath was born on April 13, 1885, in Grabow, Germany. He was the oldest of six children of Theodore Plath, a blacksmith, and Ernestine Plath (née Kottke). Recognizing that the demand for blacksmiths in Germany was decreasing due to increased industrialization, he sailed to the United States in September 1900, when he was 15 years old, aboard the Auguste Victoria. When he arrived in New York Harbor, Plath became infatuated with the city. He decided to stay in New York City for a while instead of following his original plan to go immediately to his grandparents' house in Fall Creek, Wisconsin. While Plath was living with his uncle, he clerked at his uncle's store and attended English classes.

== Adult life ==
Plath's grandfather in Wisconsin, John, agreed to finance Plath's pursuit of higher education on the condition that he became a Lutheran minister. Plath agreed to this condition, and moved in with his grandparents. In the fall of 1906, Plath enrolled in Northwestern College, majoring in classical languages. After graduating in 1910, Plath began to attend the Wisconsin Lutheran Seminary in Wauwatosa, Wisconsin. Within weeks, Plath became disillusioned with the teachings of the Wisconsin Evangelical Lutheran Synod, and dropped out of the seminary despite threats from his grandfather warning him of serious consequences if he did so. In response, John Plath ceremoniously crossed out Otto's name from the Family Bible with a pencil and disowned his grandson. Otto Plath moved to Seattle, Washington, where he taught German at the University Heights School while taking advanced studies in German at the University of Washington. After reading the writings of Charles Darwin, Plath developed an interest in biology. In the following years, Plath taught and studied in both German and biology. In 1912, he earned a Master of Arts from the University of Washington.

After the United States declared war on Imperial Germany in May 1917, Plath was investigated on suspicion of disloyalty and refusing to buy war bonds by the Federal Bureau of Investigation, but he was found to be loyal, but not uncritical, toward his adopted country.

Beginning in 1922, Plath taught at Boston University. In 1925, Plath earned an M.S. from Harvard University, and in 1928, he earned a D.Sc. degree in science, also from Harvard. Via a friend, Rupert Bartz, Plath met and in 1912 married Lydia Clara Bartz, Rupert's sister. The couple was together for a few years before the two drifted apart without legally ending the marriage.

Throughout his years of both education and teaching, Plath published his research on a range of biological subjects. The most notable examples of Plath's publishers include The American Naturalist and The Biological Bulletin. Plath's doctoral dissertation was titled Bumblebees: Their Life History, Habits, and Economic Importance, with a Detailed Account of the New England Species. In 1929, he met Aurelia Schober while she was working on her master's degree in English and German, and in 1930, he asked her to go with him to an end-of-year party at his colleague's country home. She accepted his invitation, and, at the party, Plath expressed his feelings of infatuation toward her. During their holiday break from teaching in 1931, Plath and Schober traveled to Reno, Nevada. Once there, Plath legally divorced Lydia Bartz without her participation or agreement. The two had not seen each other in more than 10 years. On January 4, 1932, Plath married Schober in Carson City, Nevada. She moved in with him upon the couple's return to the east, and on October 27, 1932, they had their first child, Sylvia Plath. In 1934, Otto Plath published his book Bumblebees and Their Ways.

== Death and influence on daughter ==
In 1935, shortly after the birth of his son Warren, Plath began to become ill. After inaccurately self-diagnosing his illness as lung cancer, he refused to seek medical care. In 1940, Plath saw a doctor due to an infection on his foot. It was then that the doctor diagnosed him as having an advanced case of diabetes. His leg had to be amputated in October after his foot infection was identified as gangrene. He died soon after on November 5, 1940, in Winthrop, Massachusetts.

Otto Plath is thought to be the subject of his daughter's poem "Daddy." His daughter, Sylvia, was age 8 at the time of his death (even though the poem "Daddy" says "I was ten when they buried you"). The death of her father is thought to have been an emotionally traumatic event for Sylvia, leading to some of her emotional problems that affected her for the rest of her life.

After the FBI declassified the files on its World War I investigation into the alleged disloyalty of Otto Plath, scholar Heather Clark criticized claims by Sylvia that her father had been a Nazi sympathizer. Clark said of Otto Plath: "He was a pacifist … Maybe [Sylvia] was misremembering, or angry towards him."
