= Application =

Application may refer to:

== Mathematics and computing ==
- Application software, computer software designed to help the user to perform specific tasks
  - Application layer, an abstraction layer that specifies protocols and interface methods used in a communications network
- Function application, in mathematics and computer science

== Processes and documents ==
- Application for employment, a form or forms that an individual seeking employment must fill out
- College application, the process by which prospective students apply for entry into a college or university
- Patent application, a document filed at a patent office to support the grant of a patent

== Other uses ==
- Application (virtue), a characteristic encapsulated in diligence
- Topical application, the spreading or putting of medication to body surfaces

== See also ==
- Apply
