= Tulips (poem) =

Poem by Sylvia Plath

"Tulips" is a poem by American poet Sylvia Plath. The poem was written in 1961 and included in the collection Ariel published in 1965. The poem is written in nine stanzas in sixty-three lines.

== Style and structure ==
"Tulips" is written in nine seven-line stanzas, totaling 63 lines, and follows no rhyme scheme. Richard Grey comments on the verse that it is "nominally free but has a subtle iambic base; the lines... ...move quietly and mellifluously; and a sense of hidden melody ('learning' / 'lying', 'lying by myself quietly', 'light lies', 'white walls') transforms casual remarks into memorable speech."

== Context ==
Ted Hughes has stated "Tulips" was written about some flowers Plath received while in a hospital recovering from an appendectomy. Unlike many of her other Ariel poems, "Tulips" was written long before her eventual suicide in 1963.

== Analysis ==
“Tulips,” written on March 18, 1961, is one of Plath’s most beloved and critically acclaimed poems. It was originally published in The New Yorker in 1962. Ted Hughes stated that the poem was written about a bouquet of tulips Plath received as she recovered from an appendectomy in the hospital. The poem consists of nine seven-line stanzas and has no rhyme scheme. Its subject is relatively straightforward: a woman, recovering from a procedure in a hospital, receives a bouquet of tulips that affront her with their glaring color and vividness. She details how they bother her, insisting she prefers to be left alone in the quiet whiteness of her room.

“Tulips” is a rich and evocative poem. Plath contrasts the whiteness and sterility of the hospital room with the liveliness of the tulips. Regarding the former, she explains “how white everything is, how quiet, how snowed-in.” There, she is “nobody” amidst a sea of faceless nurses who bring "no trouble." She is frequently numbed by medications, and has lost all of her "baggage." She is but a “thirty-year-old cargo boat” whose former life has disappeared. In other words, she treasures whiteness and sterility because they allow her an existence devoid of any self, in which she is defined by no more than the feeling she has at any particular moment. She has no context.

The tulips work against her desire to "lie with [her] hands turned up and be utterly empty.” She personifies them with excitability, loud breathing, and eyes that watch her as she rests. Her choice of adjectives – "excitable," "red," vivid" – all imbue them with a sense of liveliness. They are dangerous and alluring like an African cat. Even their color reminds her of her wound, which implicitly suggests it reminds her of her past.

The main tension in the poem, therefore, is between the speaker’s desire for the simplicity of death and the tulips’ encouragement toward life. What attracts her to the sterility of the hospital room is that it allows her to ignore the complications and pains of living. Her “loving associations” have been stripped away, and she feels pure and peaceful. The feelings suggested by her description of the room are hibernation, dormancy, and detachment. Here, she does not have a “self.” She does not have to worry about her family, the pressures of being a woman, her education, etc. Perhaps the harshest image in the poem is that of her husband and child in a picture frame. For the average reader, this is the image we expect to encourage an invalid towards life, but she considers it as simply another factor of annoying encouragement. The tulips thrust themselves in front of her with all of the brazenness of life. They not only watch her but also insist that she watch them. By bringing warmth and noise to the room, they demand she acknowledges the vivacity of life. One critic described the effect of the tulips on the speaker as the feeling one experiences when his or her leg begins to prickle with feeling after having fallen asleep.

The choice she must make is to either embrace death or painfully return to life. Most critics seem to agree that she chooses the latter. Marjorie Perloff writes that “in her anxiety, [Plath] equates the tulip petals with the ‘red blooms’ of her heart which insists on beating despite her desire for death. Finally, life returns with the taste of her hot tears; health is a ‘far away’ country but at least now it is remembered. The spell of the hospital room is broken.” In other words, she comes to realize that life is her natural state and that she will fight for it instinctively in the way her heart beats instinctively. Pamela Annas bases her argument on the organization of stanzas. She notes how, in the first four stanzas of the poem, the speaker “[describes] the world of the hospital in the yearning tones of one who has already turned her back on it and knows it is slipping away,” and in the fifth, she begins referring to her wish to stay in the past tense. In other words, the verb tenses and tone suggest the speaker is slowly accepting her decision through the poem, rather than actively making the choice.

M.D. Uroff agrees, seeing the end of the poem as a tentative return to health, but also views the poem as an expression of the mind's ability to “generate hyperboles to torture itself.” In other words, he does not want the general interpretation – that the speaker chooses life – to distract from the harshness of her perspective towards life. Barbara Hardy concurs, writing that the tulips are “inhabitants of the bizarre world of private irrational fantasy, even beyond the bridge of distorted science: they contrast with the whiteness of nullity and death, are like a baby, an African cat, is like her wound (a real red physical wound, stitched to heal, not to gape like opened tulips) and, finally, like her heart;” yet they, more than anything else, are what brings her back to life. It is safe to assume that without them, she would have remained ensconced in her bed, enjoying her lifelessness. The irony of the tulips is that they save her by torturing her, by forcing her to confront a truth that she otherwise would ignore in favor of the easier lifelessness. What this interpretation implies, then, is that the choice of life is necessarily a difficult and painful one, whereas death is not itself a choice but rather simply a refusal to continue living.

The speaker is in a hospital bed and describes her experience using an image of red tulips (presumably a gift) that interrupt her calm stay in the white hospital. During her stay at the hospital she has given up everything, including her identity, as expressed by the lines:

I am nobody; I have nothing to do with explosions.
I have given my name and my day clothes up to the nurses
And my history to the anaesthetist and my body to surgeons.

She wishes to remain in a state of emptiness, but the flowers intrude upon this state:

I didn't want any flowers, I only wanted
To lie with my hands turned up and be utterly empty.

Eileen Aird remarks: "The world of Ariel is a black and white one into which red, which represents blood, the heart, and living is always an intrusion." Renée R. Curry takes this further by claiming the tulips signify "by their glorious and bold colors, glaring Otherness."
