= The Colossus and Other Poems =

Book by Sylvia Plath

- First edition
- Author: Sylvia Plath
- Language: English
- Genre: Poetry
- Publisher: Heinemann
- Publication date: 1960
- Publication place: United Kingdom
- Media type: Print (hardback and paperback)
- Pages: 88

The Colossus and Other Poems is a poetry collection by American poet Sylvia Plath, first published by Heinemann, on 31st October 1960 in England and by Alfred A. Knopf on 14 May 1962 in the US. It is the only volume of poetry by Plath that was published before her death in 1963.

== Contents ==
The list below includes the poems from the UK version of the collection. Ten poems marked with an * were omitted from the US edition, published two years later, including five of the seven sections of "Poem for a Birthday", only two of which ("Flute Notes from a Reedy Pond" and "The Stones") are included in the US edition.

The title The Colossus comes from "Kolossus" a character who appeared in the ouija board games of Plath and Ted Hughes directing her to write poems on certain topics.

1. "The Manor Garden"
2. "Two Views of a Cadaver Room"
3. "Night Shift"
4. "Sow"
5. "The Eye-mote"
6. "Hardcastle Crags"
7. "Faun"
8. "Departure"
9. "The Colossus"
10. "Lorelei"
11. "Point Shirley"
12. "The Bull of Bendylaw"
13. "All the Dead Dears"
14. "Aftermath"
15. "The Thin People"
16. "Suicide Off Egg Rock"
17. "Mushrooms"
18. "I Want, I Want"
19. "Watercolour of Grantchester Meadows"
20. "The Ghost's Leavetaking"
21. "Metaphors" *
22. "Black Rook in Rainy Weather" *
23. "A Winter Ship"
24. "Full Fathom Five"
25. "Maudlin" *
26. "Blue Moles"
27. "Strumpet Song"
28. "Ouija" *
29. "Man in Black"
30. "Snakecharmer"
31. "The Hermit at Outermost House"
32. " The Disquieting Muses"
33. "Medallion"
34. "Two Sisters of Persephone" *
35. "The Companionable Ills"
36. "Moonrise"
37. "Spinster"
38. "Frog Autumn"
39. "Mussel Hunter at Rock Harbour"
40. "The Beekeeper's Daughter"
41. "The Times Are Tidy"
42. "The Burnt-out Spa"
43. "Sculptor"
44. "Poem for a Birthday" (seven sequence poem)
  1. "Who" *
  2. "Dark House" *
  3. "Maenad" *
  4. "The Beast" *
  5. "Flute Notes from a Reedy Pond"
  6. "Witch Burning" *
  7. "The Stones"

== Critical reception ==
Prominent journalist, poet and literary critic for The Observer newspaper, Al Alvarez, called the posthumous re-release of the book, after the success of Ariel, a "major literary event" and wrote of Plath's work:

She steers clear of feminine charm, deliciousness, gentility, supersensitivity and the act of being a poetess. She simply writes good poetry. And she does so with a seriousness that demands only that she be judged equally seriously ... There is an admirable no-nonsense air about this; the language is bare but vivid and precise, with a concentration that implies a good deal of disturbance with proportionately little fuss.

Seamus Heaney said of The Colossus: "On every page, a poet is serving notice that she has earned her credentials and knows her trade."
