= Assia Wevill =

Jewish poet and partner of Ted Hughes (1927-1969)

- Born: Assia Esther Gutmann; 15 May 1927; Berlin, Germany
- Died: 23 March 1969 (aged 41); Lambeth, Greater London, England
- Education: University of British Columbia (BA)
- Occupations: Translator; diarist; poet
- Spouses: John Steele (m. 1947; div. 1949) Richard Lipsey (m. 1952, divorced) David Wevill (m. 1960)
- Partner: Ted Hughes (1962–1969)
- Children: Alexandra Tatiana Elise "Shura" Wevill (murdered by Assia Wevill in 1969, aged 4)

Assia Esther Wevill (née Gutmann; 15 May 1927 – 23 March 1969) was a German-Latvian woman who fled the Nazis at the outset of the Second World War due to her father's Jewish heritage. She emigrated to Tel Aviv, Mandatory Palestine with her family in 1939, and later settled in England, where she became romantically involved with the English poet Ted Hughes, who was married to American poet and novelist Sylvia Plath. While she was a successful advertising copywriter and a talented translator of poetry, she is mainly remembered in the context of her relationship with Sylvia Plath and Hughes, as well as for her murder of her young daughter.

== Early life and marriages ==
Assia Gutmann was the daughter of a Jewish physician of Latvian origin, Lonya Gutmann, and a German Lutheran mother, Elisabeth "Lisa" (née Gaedeke). Her sister Celia was born on 22 September 1929. They fled the Nazis in 1939 and moved to Mandatory Palestine where she lived for eight years. She spent most of her youth in Tel Aviv. Described by friends and family as a free-spirited young woman, she would go out to dance at the British soldiers' club, where she met Sergeant John Steele, with whom she moved to London in 1946 and who became her first husband in 1947.

According to her biographers, Yehuda Koren and Eilat Negev, "she had entered an essentially loveless marriage with an Englishman at the age of 20 – largely to enable her family to immigrate to England." The couple later immigrated to Vancouver, Canada, where Gutmann enrolled at the University of British Columbia and met the man who would become her second husband, Canadian economist Richard Lipsey. Gutmann and Steele divorced in 1949 and she married Lipsey in 1952.

In 1956, on a ship to London, she met the 21-year-old Canadian poet David Wevill. They began an affair and Gutmann divorced Lipsey; she and Wevill married in 1960 to her death in 1969.

== Career ==
Wevill had a successful career in advertising and was an aspiring poet who published, under her maiden name Assia Gutmann, an English translation of the work of Israeli poet Yehuda Amichai.

== Ted Hughes ==
In 1961, poets Ted Hughes and Sylvia Plath rented their flat in Chalcot Square, Primrose Hill, London, to Assia and David Wevill, and took up residence at North Tawton, Devon. Hughes was immediately struck with Wevill, as she was with him. He later wrote:

We didn't find her – she found us.
She sniffed us out...
She sat there...
Slightly filthy with erotic mystery...
I saw the dreamer in her
Had fallen in love with me and she did not know it.
That moment the dreamer in me
Fell in love with her, and I knew it.

Plath noted their chemistry. Soon afterward, Hughes and Wevill began an affair. At the time of Plath's suicide, Wevill was pregnant with Hughes's child, but she had an abortion soon after Plath's death. The actual relationship, who instigated it and its circumstances, has been hotly debated for many years.

After Plath's suicide, Hughes moved Wevill into Court Green (the Devon home at North Tawton he had bought with Plath), where Wevill helped care for Hughes and Plath's two children, Frieda and Nicholas. Wevill was reportedly haunted by Plath's memory; she even began using things that had once belonged to Plath. In their biography of Wevill, Lover of Unreason, Koren and Negev maintain that she used Plath's items not from obsession, but for the sake of practicality since she was maintaining a household for Hughes and his children. On 3 March 1965, at age 37, Wevill gave birth to Alexandra Tatiana Elise, nicknamed Shura, while still married to David Wevill.

Ostracized by her lover's friends and family, and eclipsed by the figure of Plath in public life, Wevill became anxious and suspicious of Hughes's infidelity. Hughes began affairs with Brenda Hedden, a married acquaintance who frequented their home, and Carol Orchard, a nurse 20 years his junior, whom he would later marry in 1970. Wevill's relationship with Hughes was also fraught with other complexities, as shown by a collection of his letters to her acquired by Emory University. She was continually distraught by his reluctance to marry her and establish a home together, as well as his treatment of her as a "housekeeper". In his letter to Leonard Baskin on 16 July 1969, Hughes references Shura, his daughter with Wevill. He writes, "I have two nice children who make life a great pleasure.... I had a third, a little marvel, but she died with her mother."

== Death ==
On 23 March 1969, at their London flat, Wevill killed her daughter Shura and then herself in a murder-suicide, sometimes described a "copycat suicide" of Plath's, using sleeping pills and turning on the gas stove.

== Legacy ==
=== In advertising ===
Wevill composed the 90-second "Lost Island" advertisement for "Sea Witches" ladies' hair-dye product for television and cinemas, called a "breakthrough in type" and a "huge success" by her biographers, Koren and Negev, that was "applauded in theaters." The advert can be viewed in some classic ad compilations or sometimes as an online posting.

=== In literature ===
- Ted Hughes's volume of poetry Crow (1970) was dedicated to the memory of Wevill and Shura.
- His poem "Folktale" deals with his relationship with Wevill:

She wanted the silent heraldry
Of the purple beach by the noble wall.
He wanted Cabala the ghetto demon
With its polythene bag full of ashes.

- Hughes published half a dozen poems he had written for Wevill, which were hidden among the total of 240 in New Selected Poems (1989).
- In "The Error." he wrote:

When her grave opened its ugly mouth
why didn't you just fly,
Why did you kneel down at the grave's edge
to be identified
accused and convicted?

- In "The Descent", he wrote:

your own hands, stronger than your choked outcry,
Took your daughter from you. She was stripped from you,
The last raiment
Clinging round your neck, the sole remnant
Between you and the bed
In the underworld

- Wevill appears as "Helen" in Fay Weldon's novel Down Among the Women (1971).

=== In film and television ===
- In the feature film Sylvia (2003), Wevill is portrayed by Amira Casar.
- In October 2015, the BBC Two documentary Ted Hughes: Stronger Than Death examined Hughes's life and work, and included an examination of the part played by Wevill.
