= Primrose Hill =

Park in London, England

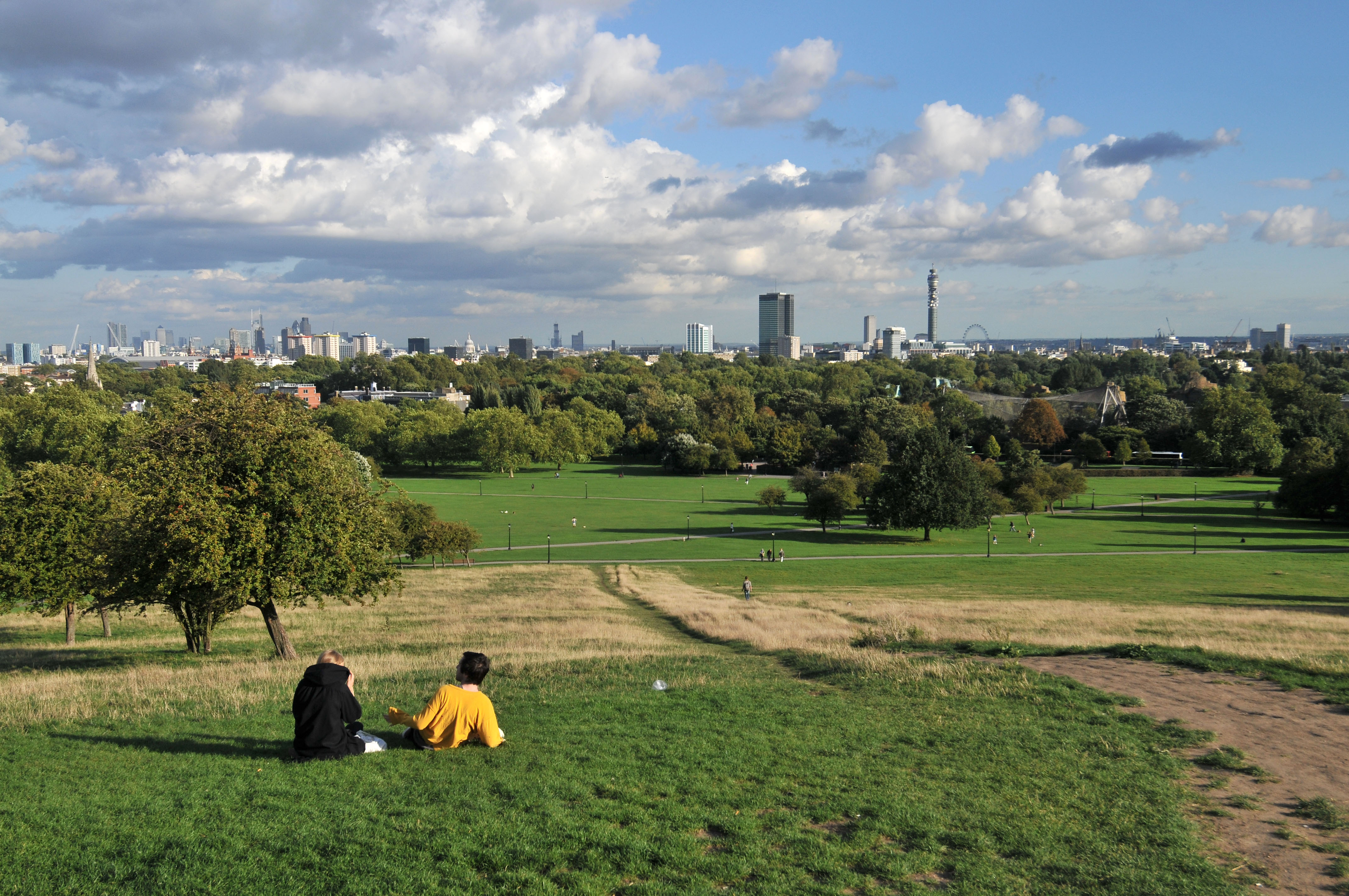
- View of London from the top of Primrose Hill

- Location within London Borough of Camden
- Type: Public park
- Location: London Borough of Camden, England
- OS grid: TQ282838
- Coordinates: 51.5396°N 0.1608°W
- Area: 25.18 hectares (62.2 acres)
- Elevation: 64 metres (210 ft)
- Designated: 1842
- Operator: The Royal Parks
- Status: Open
- Public transit: Swiss Cottage tube station, Chalk Farm tube station
- Part of: Regent's Park
- Facilities: Playground and toilets
- Website: www.royalparks.co.uk

Primrose Hill is a public park in the London Borough of Camden, immediately north of Regent's Park. A Royal Park, it was first opened to the public in 1842 and is named for the 64-metre (210 ft) hill at its centre. (Note: Height according to the Ordnance Survey.)

The hill's summit, a protected view, has a clear view of central London, as well as Hampstead and Belsize Park to the north, and is adorned by an engraved quotation from William Blake. Protected as a historic park since 2001, the park also lends its name to the adjoining district and electoral ward.

Amenities of the park include an outdoor gym, a children's playground, and toilets, all located on the south side closer to Regent's Park. Having historically been considered as an extension of that park, Primrose Hill is managed by The Royal Parks.

== History ==
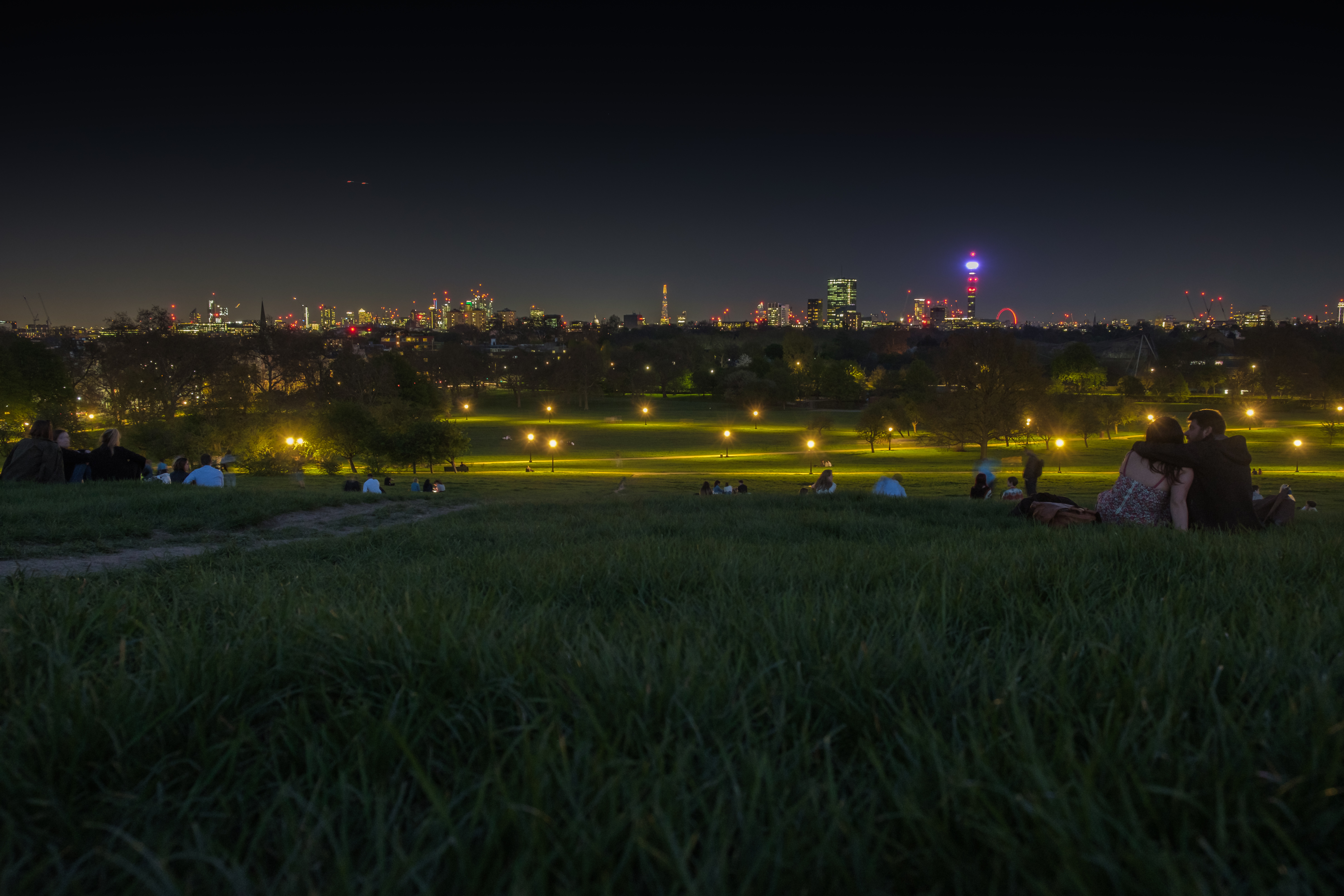
Nighttime view from Primrose Hill

Like Regent's Park, Primrose Hill was once part of a great chase appropriated by Henry VIII. The name "Primrose Hill" has been in use since the 15th century, giving the lie to later claims that it was named after Archibald Primrose, 5th Earl of Rosebery, during whose premiership the London Underground rail network expanded considerably.

In October 1678, Primrose Hill was the scene of the mysterious murder of Sir Edmund Berry Godfrey. In 1679 three Catholic labourers, Robert Green, Henry Berry and Lawrence Hill were found guilty of the murder and hanged at the top of the hill, but subsequently posthumously exonerated. For a few years after the hanging, Primrose Hill was known as Greenberry Hill.

In 1792, Primrose Hill was the site of the first meeting of the "Gorsedd of the Bards of the Isles of Britain", organised by the Welsh radical poet and antiquarian Iolo Morganwg. The Gorsedd, a community of bards, met at a ceremony on 21 June (the summer solstice) designed to replicate ancient Druidic rites. A plaque commemorating this event was unveiled in 2009 by Huw Edwards on behalf of the London Welsh Association.

The Regent's Canal, which passes through the area, was completed in 1816. During the 1820s a number of plans were put forward to use the area as a burial site, but alternative locations were ultimately chosen. The railway running under the hill was completed in 1838; this was the first rail tunnel in London. By that time, the area was considered to be a "prime development opportunity" according to one source. In 1840, Charles FitzRoy, 3rd Baron Southampton, sold the land that he owned, and new villas were built in subsequent years. Other land was still owned by Eton College, but was transferred to the government in 1841. The area became Crown property, and in 1842 an Act of Parliament secured the land as public open space. The Crown drained and levelled the land after 1851 and began adding features to turn it into a "park for the people". The park was historically split between the ancient parishes (which later became metropolitan boroughs) of Marylebone (now part of the City of Westminster), St Pancras and Hampstead (in the modern London Borough of Camden), with the hill itself a part of Hampstead.

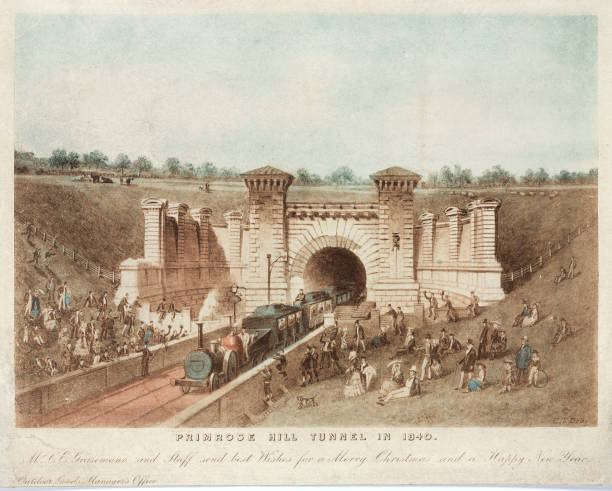
Primrose Hill Tunnel in 1840

The area east of the park was developed and became known as Primrose Hill, after the park. The Primrose Hill district is surrounded by St John's Wood to the west, Swiss Cottage to the northwest, Belsize Park to the north, Chalk Farm to the northeast, Camden Town to the east, and Regent's Park lies adjacent to the south of the hill. The nearest stations to Primrose Hill are Chalk Farm tube station to the northeast and Swiss Cottage tube station to the northwest. Beginning in the late 1960s several of the roads were closed to motor traffic in response to an unacceptable level of collisions and consequent loss of life. The changes were carefully designed to significantly reduce through motor traffic in the area. The defunct Primrose Hill railway station, now housing a business, sits on the railway lines that separate the Primrose Hill area from Camden Town. The eastern and western portals of Primrose Hill Tunnel, the first railway tunnel in London, were Grade II* listed in 1974.

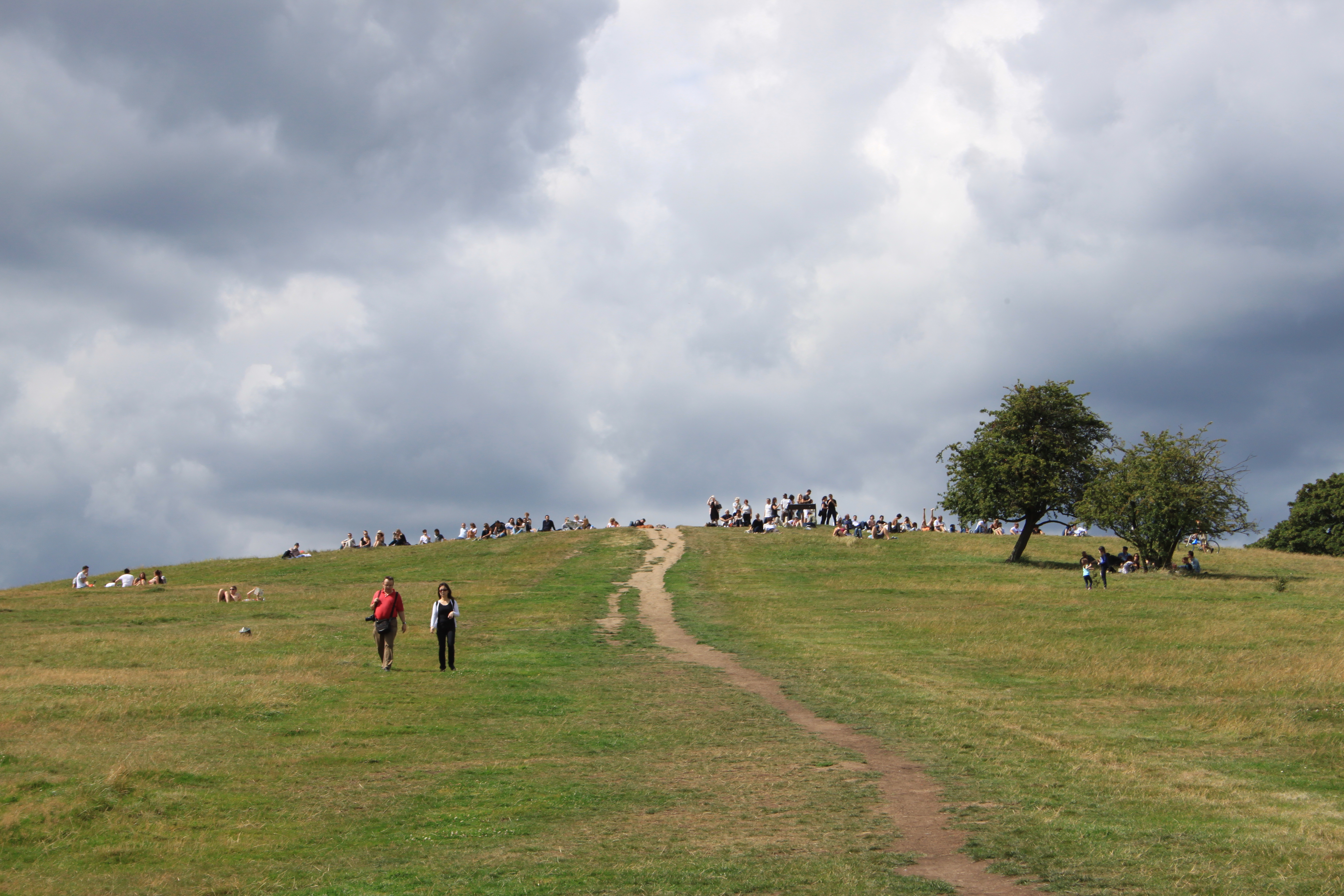
The hill's summit

In 2021 crowds flocked to Primrose Hill following the loosening of lockdown restrictions due to the COVID-19 pandemic in London. Large amounts of litter were left around the park and social distancing was not observed.

On 31 December 2023, as crowds gathered in the park to watch the New Year's Eve fireworks, 16 year old Harry Pitman was stabbed to death by Areece Lloyd-Hall who was subsequently tried, convicted and jailed for murder. The following year, 30,000 people attended the park on New Years Eve. Due to safety, policing and crowd control concerns, the park was closed for the 2025 Bonfire Night and New Year's Eve celebrations. The park also began to be shut on Friday, Saturday and Sunday nights, between April and October. Despite these measures, in April 2026, another stabbing occurred killing a 21 year old man, with three men subsequently charged for his murder.

== Notable buildings and residents ==
The Primrose Hill district is an archetypal example of a successful London urban village, due to the location and the quality of its socio-historical development. Elliott Square is a grouping of modernist 1960s houses by Douglas Streeter, built as part of the Chalcot Estate on land owned by Eton College. The area and is home to many prominent residents.

There are seven English Heritage blue plaques in Primrose Hill commemorating the historic personalities that have lived there. The plaques mark the residences of poet Sir Hugh Clough, historian and broadcaster A. J. P. Taylor and painter William Roberts at 11, 13, and 14 St Mark's Crescent respectively; revolutionary socialist and philosopher Friedrich Engels at 122 (and later 41) Regent's Park Road; photographer Roger Fenton at 2 Albert Terrace; poet and novelist Sylvia Plath at 3 Chalcot Square; and poet William Butler Yeats at 23 Fitzroy Road. (Note: Sylvia Plath also lived at 23 Fitzroy Road, from December 1962 and died there, by suicide, on 11 February 1963.)

Stanley Johnson and Lukas Heller each lived at different times at the 'Rocking Horse House' on Regent's Park Road. Among those who have lived in the area are broadcasters Joan Bakewell and Nicholas Crane, as well as actors Daisy Ridley, Derek Jacobi, Brian Cox, Daniel Craig and wife Rachel Weisz, Lily James and Hugh Laurie.

The plant morphologist Agnes Arber was born in Primrose Hill.

== In popular culture ==
Primrose Hill is commonly referred to as an "iconic" and "famous'" location, and features significantly in popular British culture.

- In the book The War of the Worlds by H. G. Wells, the Martians' biggest camp in the UK is at Primrose Hill.
- The Rolling Stones took the photo for the cover of their 1967 album Between the Buttons on Primrose Hill.
- John and Beverley Martyn's 1970 album The Road to Ruin includes the song Primrose Hill.
- The band Madness have a song titled "Primrose Hill" on their album The Rise & Fall.
- The songs "The Promise" and "Hoxton Heroes" by Girls Aloud mention Primrose Hill in the lyrics: "Here I am, walking Primrose, wondering if I'm gonna see you again" and "You've got the Primrose Set on your cell phone".
- The song "For Tomorrow" by Blur references Primrose Hill, with the line "Let's take a drive to Primrose Hill," and the extended version's title includes the line "(Visit to Primrose Hill Extended)". The park was used as one of the filming locations for the music video.
- The song "Upfield" by Billy Bragg on his album William Bloke mentions "seeing angels up on Primrose Hill".
- The film Bridget Jones: The Edge of Reason was partially filmed on Primrose Hill.
- Primrose Hill is a main location in the action/animated comedy films Paddington and Paddington 2.
- A house in Primrose Hill was inspiration for One Hundred and One Dalmatians.
- In Jackass: The Movie, Primrose Hill is used for the "Rocket Skates" stunt, wherein cast members strap bottle rockets to rollerblades and attempt to skate through the park.
- James McCartney and Sean Ono Lennon, sons of Paul McCartney and John Lennon, respectively, released their first joint collaboration, a song titled "Primrose Hill", in April 2024.
- Primrose Hill (Faber & Faber, 1999), is the title of a novel by Helen Falconer.

During the 1990s Primrose Hill was a popular place to live with some who worked in the film, television, music and fashion industries and who were referred to as the Primrose Hill set in the media.

== See also ==
- Primrose Hill railway station, by North London Railway
