= Sylvia (2003 film) =

- Directed by: Christine Jeffs
- Written by: John Brownlow
- Produced by: Alison Owen; Mary Richards
- Starring: Gwyneth Paltrow; Daniel Craig; Jared Harris; Michael Gambon; Blythe Danner
- Cinematography: John Toon
- Edited by: Tariq Anwar
- Music by: Gabriel Yared
- Production companies: BBC Films; UK Film Council; Capitol Films; Ruby Films
- Distributed by: Icon Film Distribution (United Kingdom); Focus Features (United States and Canada); Capitol Films (Overseas)
- Release dates: 17 October 2003 (United States); 30 January 2004 (United Kingdom)
- Running time: 110 minutes
- Countries: United Kingdom; United States
- Language: English
- Box office: $2.9 million

Sylvia is a 2003 British biographical drama film directed by Christine Jeffs and starring Gwyneth Paltrow, Daniel Craig, Jared Harris, and Michael Gambon. It tells a story based on the real-life romance between prominent poets Sylvia Plath and Ted Hughes. The film begins with their meeting at Cambridge in 1956 and ends with Sylvia Plath's suicide in 1963.

== Plot ==
Born in Boston, Massachusetts in 1932, Plath developed a precocious talent as a writer, publishing her first poem when she was only eight years old. That same year, tragedy introduced itself into her life as Plath was forced to confront the unexpected death of her father. In 1950, she began studying at Smith College on a literary scholarship, and while she was an outstanding student, she also began suffering from bouts of extreme depression. Following her junior year, she attempted suicide for the first time. Plath survived, and, in 1955, she was granted a Fulbright Scholarship to study in England at the University of Cambridge.

The film begins with a shot of Plath sleeping, then opening her eyes. As a student at Cambridge, she rides along on her red bicycle and wearing an academic gown. She hears of a party to celebrate the publishing of a magazine called St. Botolph's, where she meets the young poet Ted Hughes. The two fall in love and marry in 1956, then go off to Massachusetts where her mother Aurelia lives. While they are both teaching at Smith College, Sylvia quickly learns that others are also enthralled by her husband, due to his combination of good looks, charisma, fame, and success. They return to England, first to London and then to Devon, where Sylvia raises their two children and lives in her husband's professional shadow as she tries to eke out her own writing career, which doesn't come as naturally to her as it does to Ted. After a visit by David and Assia Wevill, who had rented their London flat, Sylvia rightly accuses Ted of infidelity. She kicks him out and then begins to write the poems that would be published posthumously in her collection titled Ariel. Sylvia then moves back to London with her children. Ted visits at Christmas and they make love again, but he says he cannot leave Assia, who is pregnant. Shortly thereafter, she prepares for her suicide, sealing off the children's room from the gas from her gas oven. A nurse comes to take out the children and Ted sees Plath's manuscript on her desk. A closing title informs us that her book made her much beloved and that Ted wrote his response in 1998 (just before his death), in a collection titled Birthday Letters.

== Cast ==
- Gwyneth Paltrow as Sylvia Plath
- Daniel Craig as Ted Hughes
- David Birkin as Morecambe
- Alison Bruce as Elizabeth
- Amira Casar as Assia Wevill
- Blythe Danner as Aurelia Plath
- Lucy Davenport as Doreen
- Julian Firth as James Michie
- Jeremy Fowlds as Mr. Robinson
- Michael Gambon as Teacher Thomas
- Sarah Guyler as Ted's Cambridge Girlfriend
- Jared Harris as Al Alvarez
- Michael Mears as Charles Langridge
- Andrew Havill as David Wevill
- Liddy Holloway as Martha Bergstrom

== Production ==
Frieda Hughes, Sylvia Plath's daughter, objected to the making of the film and denied BBC Films the rights to her mother's poetry. Hughes published a poem in the magazine Tatler, which contained the line, "They think I should give them my mother's words/To fill the mouth of their monster/Their Sylvia Suicide Doll."

Pawel Pawlikowski was originally attached to direct. However, he left due to the lack of artistic control he was given. "I walked away because the script wasn’t good, and it became a Hollywood film, where you didn’t have much control. With my methods of sculpting and changing things, I would have got fired after a week," he said.

Filming took place between October 2002 and February 2003. Much of the film was shot in and around the New Zealand city of Dunedin, with the University of Otago serving to represent Cambridge.

== Reception ==
On review aggregate website Rotten Tomatoes, Sylvia has a 36% "rotten" approval rating based on 132 critics' reviews. The site's critics consensus reads, "This biopic about Sylvia Plath doesn't rise above the level of highbrow melodrama." On Metacritic, the film has a score of 56 out of 100 based on 40 reviews, indicating "mixed or average reviews".

Roger Ebert gave the film three out of a possible four stars, praising Paltrow and Craig's performances. A.O. Scott, writing for The New York Times, also praised Paltrow's portrayal of Plath, but wrote that, "The psychological dynamics of the marriage, unsettled by professional envy and sexual jealousy, are duly noted, but the film's emotions are too big, too untidy and too strange to be contained by its story."

Claudia Puig of USA Today also praised the performances, but said the film falls short of "depicting Plath as an artist. We don't learn what inspired her to pursue writing as an outlet for her emotional turmoil." Puig also commented that the movie "glosses over" what led Plath and Hughes to drift apart from each other. Writing for Slate, Meghan O'Rourke said while the film "purports to be interested in Plath as an artist, it tends to reinforce the old clichés about her work." O'Rourke added it "fails to explore the fact that Plath was one of the first major American poets to be a mother and to take the pleasure of motherhood as her subject."
