= Fitzroy Road =

Street in London, England

Coordinates: 51.5407°N 0.1539°W

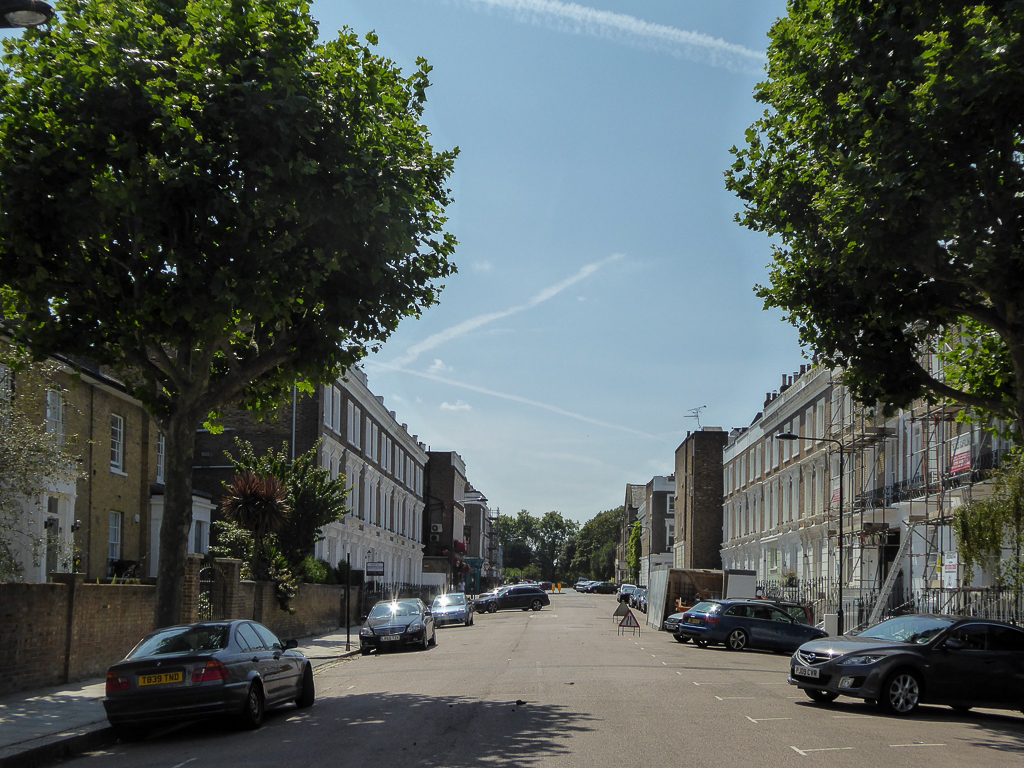
Looking westwards towards Primrose Hill.

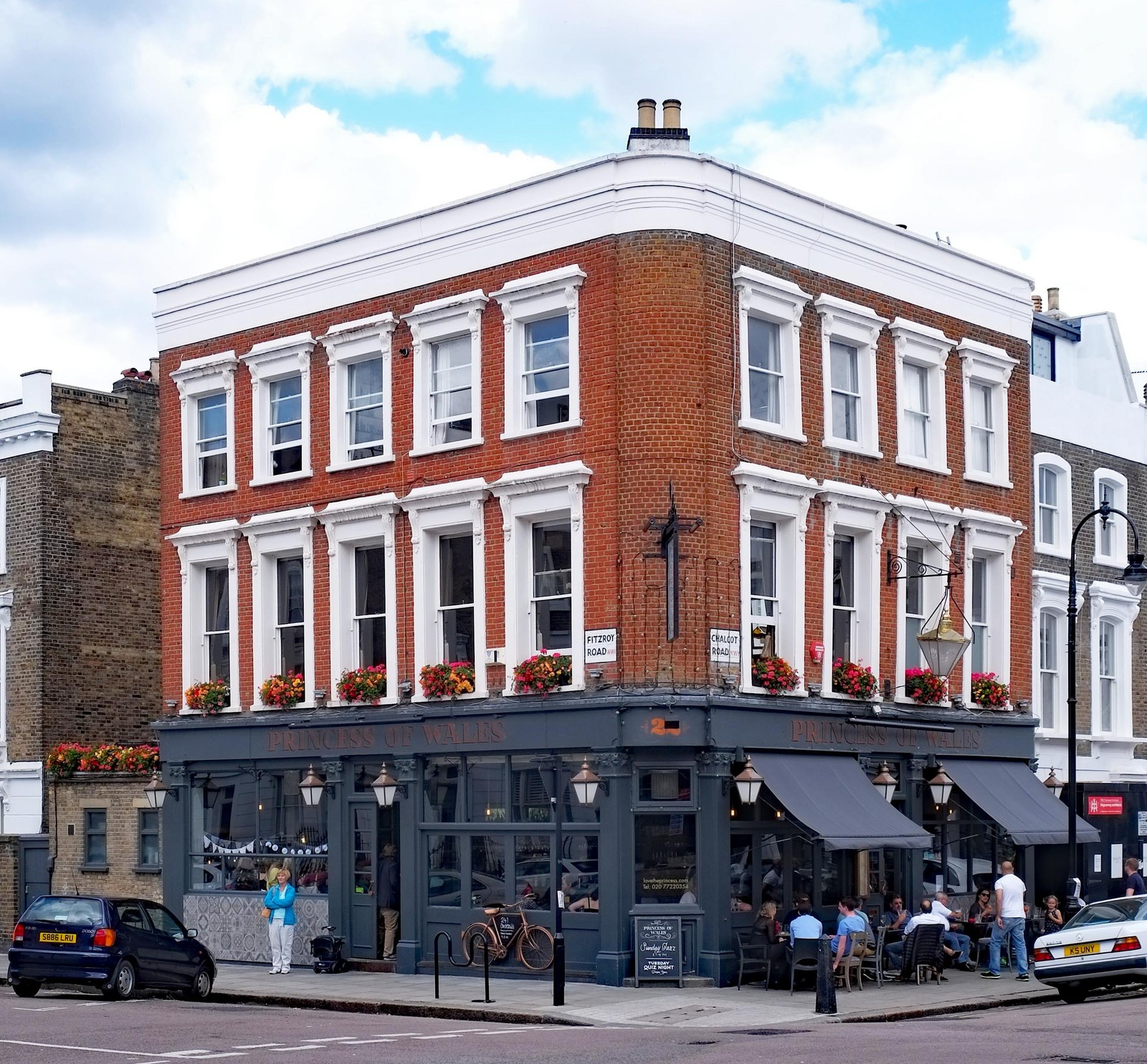
The Princess of Wales pub at the junction with Chalcot Road.

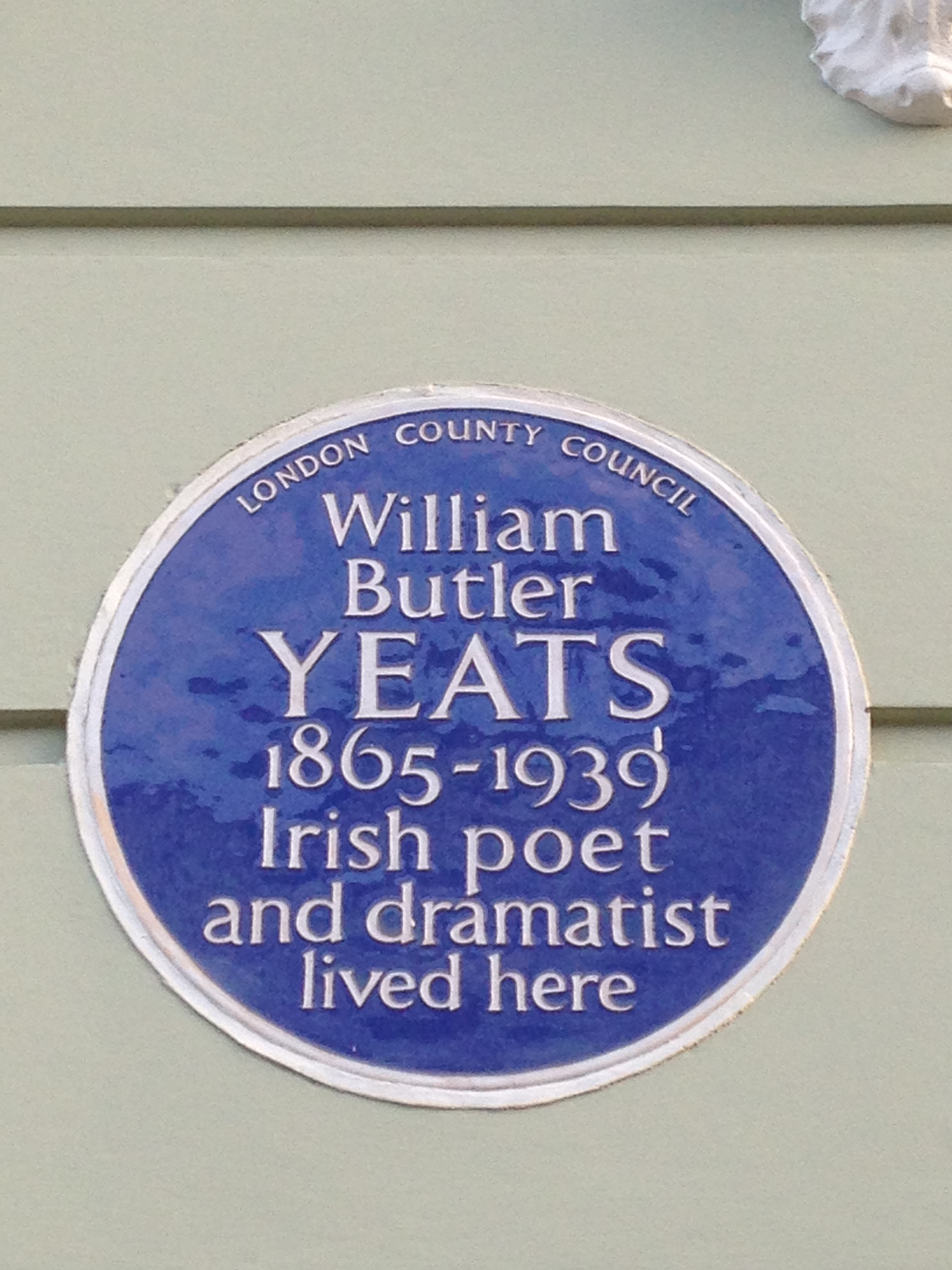
Blue Plaque for the Irish writer William Butler Yeats at his former residence at 23 Fitzroy Road.

Fitzroy Road is a street in the Primrose Hill area of London. Located in the London Borough of Camden, it is a residential road lined with Victorian era houses. It runs roughly northeastwards from Regent's Park Road at the edge of Primrose Hill to Gloucester Avenue. Fitzroy Road is crossed around halfway along its route by Chalcot Road that links it to Chalcot Square to the north. The Princess of Wales pub stands at the corner with Chalcot Road.

The street takes its name from the Fitzroy family who owned the estate in the area that was developed from 1840 onwards. A straight, wide road, most of its buildings date from 1850 to 1880. The eastern extremity of the road beyond Gloucester Avenue, a short cul-de-sac leading to the Main Line to Euston, was originally known as Fitzroy Place until 1872, when it was renamed Dumpton Place.

The Irish writer William Butler Yeats lived in Fitzroy Road and is now commemorated with a blue plaque. It is the same address where Sylvia Plath lived before committing suicide. Other notable residents of the street have included H. G. Wells, Jacquetta Hawkes, Arthur Rackham, Henry Wood, Martita Hunt and Lord Methuen.

== Bibliography ==
- Bebbington, Gillian. London Street Names. Batsford, 1972.
- Cherry, Bridget & Pevsner, Nikolaus. London 3: North West. Yale University Press, 2002.
- Woodford, Peter (ed.) From Primrose Hill to Euston Road. Camden History Society, 1995.
