= Sharpe's Rifles =

1988 historical novel by Bernard Cornwell

- First edition
- Author: Bernard Cornwell
- Language: English
- Series: Richard Sharpe
- Genre: Historical novels
- Publisher: Collins
- Publication date: December 1988
- Publication place: United Kingdom
- Media type: Print (Hardcover and Paperback) and audio-CD
- Pages: 356 (hardcover edition)); 352 (paperback edition)
- ISBN: 0-00-223233-2 (hardcover edition); ISBN 0-00-617697-6 (paperback edition)
- OCLC: 16715266
- Preceded by: Sharpe's Prey
- Followed by: Sharpe's Havoc

Sharpe's Rifles is chronologically the sixth, but the ninth published, historical novel in the Richard Sharpe series by Bernard Cornwell, first published in 1988. The narrative follows Sharpe and his unit as they are caught up in the French invasion of Galicia, Spain in January 1809 during the Peninsular War.

== Plot summary ==
Sharpe's battalion, acting as rearguard to the British Army in its retreat to Corunna, are cut down by a squadron of French regular cavalry. Sharpe takes up Captain Murray's heavy cavalry sword after Murray dies and takes command of the surviving riflemen (from the 95th Rifles). However, the men do not want to follow him. Their leader, Patrick Harper, and Sharpe fight, but they are interrupted by the arrival of Spanish Major Blas Vivar and his men.

Vivar invites the British to travel with him to escort them back to Portugal, but does not reveal his hidden agenda. The Spanish commoners hate the French invaders, but are dispirited and need something to rally around. In the course of the journey, Sharpe begins to gain the respect of his men, especially when his ability as a soldier gets them through a French ambush. Travelling on, they meet the Parkers, a Methodist couple, and their niece Louisa, with whom Sharpe falls in love, though it does not work out. Sharpe learns from a map the Parkers possess that Vivar is not taking them home at all and after a confrontation, falls out with Vivar and takes his men home.

On their way back, they are attacked by a French detachment led by Pierre D'Eclin and Vivar's pro-French brother, who had earlier been pursuing Vivar. Vivar comes to the rescue and helps them escape, though Louisa's aunt and uncle are captured and later sent home, being civilians.

Vivar confesses he lied to Sharpe because he needed Sharpe's help for an odd mission: taking the gonfalon of Santiago (the biblical saint James) to the city of Santiago de Compostela. According to legend, raising the gonfalon there will summon the saint to Spain's aid; Vivar is certain that the act will rouse his people. However, the city is held by a strong French force and the French are aware of Vivar's goal. Sharpe agrees to help Vivar take the city if Vivar can convince Patrick Harper to become a sergeant, something Sharpe had failed to do.

Through deceit, Sharpe seemingly manages to draw away many of the French soldiers on a wild goose chase, and against all odds, the city is seized. But then Sharpe realizes—almost too late—that the French were not fooled, and had hidden most of their supposedly absent troops in a building. They launch a surprise attack, but due to Sharpe's actions, they are defeated, and Vivar is given enough time to raise the gonfalon. Pierre D'Eclin and Major Vivar's brother are killed in the subsequent retreat from the city. Vivar inherits his elder brother's title of Count of Mouromorto and marries Louisa, who does not wish to return to England and a boring fiance.

Sharpe finally makes it back to Portugal, where he meets engineer Captain Hogan who reveals that the British have not abandoned the war and offers Sharpe the opportunity to work with him.

== Characters ==
- Richard Sharpe – Lieutenant in the 95th Rifles
- Patrick Harper – One of Sharpe's new riflemen
- Captain Michael Hogan – An engineer and one of Wellesley's exploring officers.
- Daniel Hagman– A rifleman and ex-poacher
- Major Blas Vivar – A Spanish officer on a mission
- Count of Mouromorto – Ally of the French and brother of Blas Vivar
- Major Warren Dunnett – Sharpe's commanding officer who is captured by the French
- Captain Murray – Sharpe's superior who dies, leaving Sharpe his own sword
- Louisa Parker – A young Englishwoman whom Sharpe takes a fancy to. She ends up marrying Major Blas Vivar.

== Television adaptation ==
Sharpe's Rifles came about because a Spanish production company expressed interest in investing in a television series, so Cornwell wrote a novel featuring a major Spanish character. It worked.

Sharpe's Rifles was adapted as the first episode of the Sharpe television series starring Sean Bean as Sharpe, Brian Cox as Hogan and Daragh O'Malley as Harper and guest starring Simon Andreu as Vivar, Julian Fellowes as Major Dunnett and Tim Bentinck as Captain Murray. The adaptation also introduced the character of Teresa Moreno (played by Assumpta Serna), Sharpe's future wife, prior to her introduction in the novels in Sharpe's Gold, as a colleague of Vivar and replaced the company of men from the novels with five key characters: three of these, Hagman (John Tams), Cooper (Michael Mears) and Tongue (Paul Trussell), came from the novel, the other two, Harris (Jason Salkey) and Perkins (Lyndon Davies), were invented. It added an opening sequence of Sharpe saving the life of Sir Arthur Wellesley (David Troughton) and earning a battlefield commission (an event that happened during the Second Mahratta War in the novels). Major Dunnett, who is merely captured in the book, is killed in the opening ambush, as is Sergeant Williams who survives until halfway through in the book. The backdrop of the retreat to Corunna was dropped and instead Sharpe is searching for an army banker, James Rothschild (Kerry Shale). Louisa, the primary love interest from the novel, is reduced to a minor character whose uncle turns out to be a colleague of Hogan and whose "aunt" is Rothschild in disguise (in the book she travels with her actual aunt and uncle). Hogan is given a larger role, manipulating Sharpe into assisting Vivar. The death of the primary villain Colonel De L'Eclin is altered slightly: In the book, he hides in Santiago with an army, in the television version, he returns alone to confront Sharpe and is killed by Perkins when he pulls a gun on him.

== Release details ==
- 1988, UK, HarperCollins ISBN 0-00-223233-2, Pub date ? December 1988, hardback (First edition)
- 1989, UK, Chivers Audio Books ISBN 0-7451-5876-5, Pub date ? June 1989, Audio book cassette
- 1994, UK, HarperCollins ISBN 0-00-617697-6, Pub date 1 January 1994, paperback
