= Primrose Hill (district) =

District in the London Borough of Camden

Coordinates: 51.54°N 0.16°W

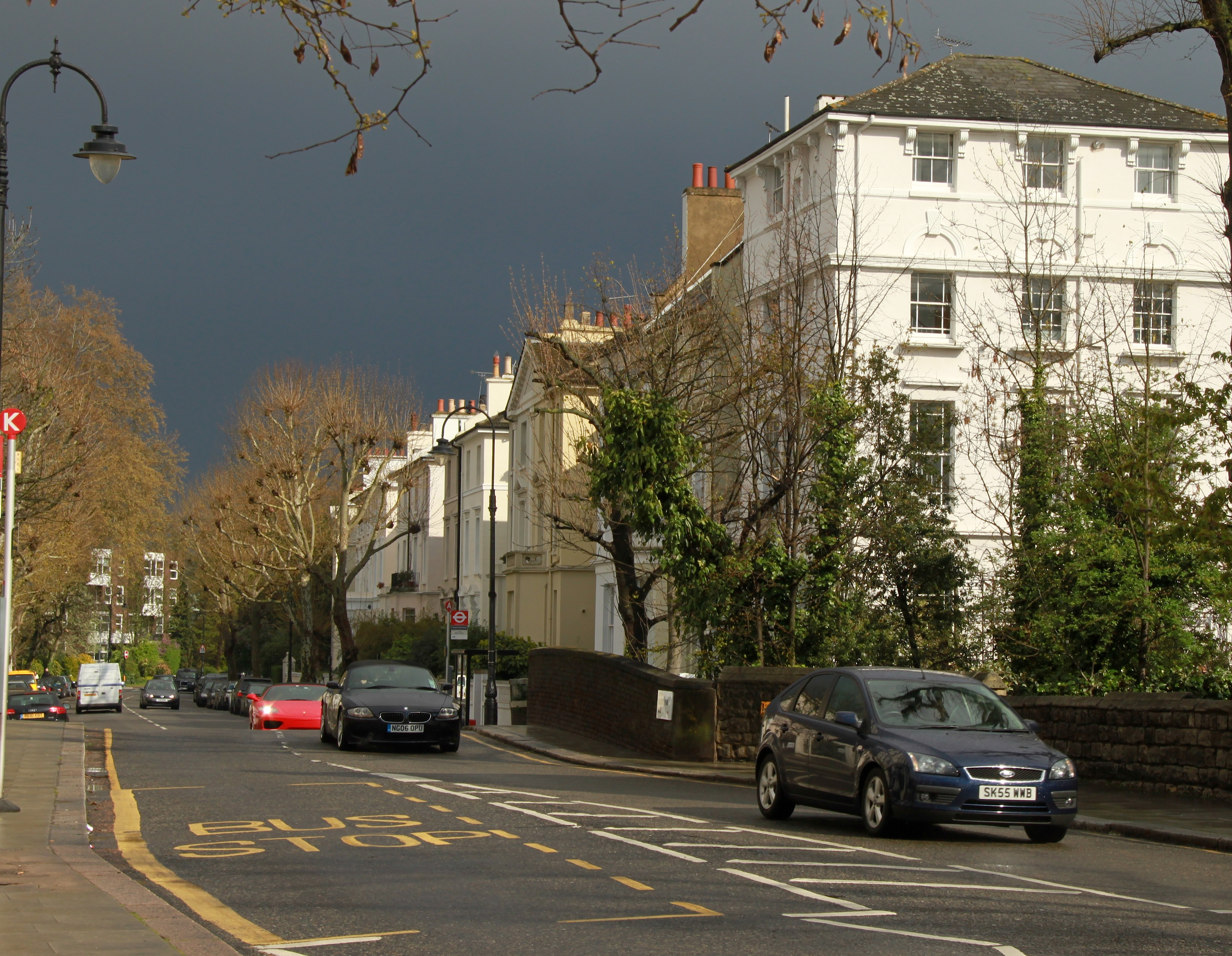
Regent's Park Road

Primrose Hill is a district in the London Borough of Camden, England.

The area east of the park was developed and became known as Primrose Hill. Primrose Hill is surrounded by St John's Wood to the west, Swiss Cottage to the northwest, Belsize Park to the north, Chalk Farm to the northeast, Camden Town to the east and Regent's Park to the south. The nearest Tube stations are Chalk Farm to the northeast and Swiss Cottage to the northwest. The defunct Primrose Hill railway station, now housing a business, sits on the railway lines that separate Primrose Hill from Camden Town. Primrose Hill Tunnel, the first railway tunnel in London, has had its eastern portals Grade II*- and its western portals Grade II* listed since 1974.

Primrose Hill is an archetypal example of a successful London urban village, due to the location and the quality of its socio-historical development, and is home to many prominent residents. Beginning in the late 1960s several of the roads were closed to motor traffic in response to an unacceptable level of collisions and consequent loss of life. The changes were carefully designed to render the area largely free of through motor traffic.

== Notable buildings and residents ==
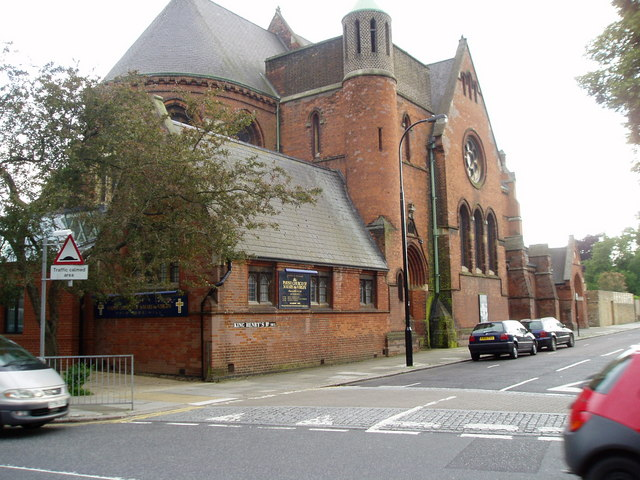
St Mary the Virgin, Elsworthy Road

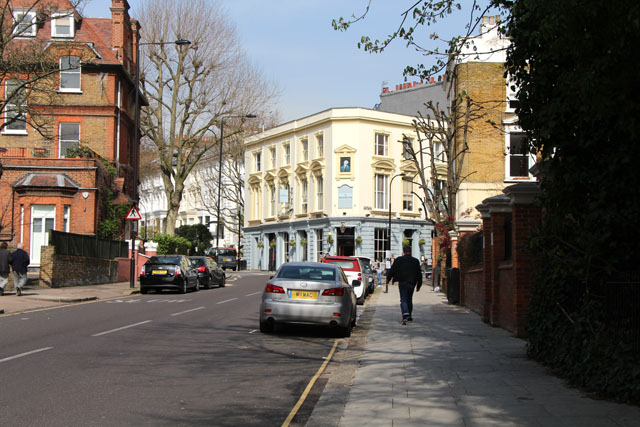
The Washington public house, seen from Primrose Hill Road.

There are seven English Heritage blue plaques in Primrose Hill commemorating the historic personalities that have lived there. The plaques mark the residences of poet Sir Hugh Clough, historian and broadcaster A. J. P. Taylor and painter William Roberts at 11, 13, and 14 St Mark's Crescent respectively; revolutionary socialist and philosopher Friedrich Engels at 122 (and later 41) Regent's Park Road; photographer Roger Fenton at 2 Albert Terrace; poet and novelist Sylvia Plath at 3 Chalcot Square; and poet William Butler Yeats at 23 Fitzroy Road. (Note: Sylvia Plath also lived at 23 Fitzroy Road, from December 1962 and died there, by suicide, on 11 February 1963.)

Stanley Johnson and Lukas Heller each lived at different times at the Rocking Horse House on Regent's Park Road. Broadcasters Joan Bakewell and Nicholas Crane and actors Daisy Ridley and Derek Jacobi live in the area.

Elliott Square is a grouping of modernist 1960s houses by Douglas Streeter, built as part of the Chalcot Estate on land owned by Eton College.

During the 1990s Primrose Hill was a popular place to live with some who worked in the film, music and fashion industries and who were referred to as the Primrose Hill set in British newspapers.

The parish church of St Mary the Virgin is located on Elsworthy Road. It dates from 1871-72, was designed by Michael P. Manning and was built by Dove Brothers. A south aisle and chapel were added in about 1891-92. It is constructed of red brick with stone dressing and has slate roofs, with lugged brick eaves cornices. It is a Grade II listed building.
