= Wilbury Crockett =

English teacher

Wilbury Arthur Crockett (1913-1994) was an English teacher at Wellesley High School near Boston, Massachusetts where American poet Sylvia Plath was one of his students. He taught at the school for 36 years from 1944 until 1980. In 2012 a new school library was named after him.

== Teaching career ==
Crockett taught briefly in Connecticut before he and his wife Vera moved to Wellesley in 1944. He remained at Wellesley High School for the duration of his career, and as Chair of the English Department until his retirement in 1980. At Wellesley, unusually, Crockett taught the same student cohort through all three years of high school, covering a wide range of literature by modern British, Irish and major Americal authors as well as Greek drama and philosophy, Shakespeare and the English poets, European writers including Thomas Mann, Gustave Flaubert, and the Russian realists. Calling themselved "Crocketteers", several of Crockett's students, including Plath, attest to his influence as a teacher.

After his retirement in 1980 Crockett declined a job teaching creative writing at the Cambridge School of Weston.

== Sylvia Plath ==
As a teacher, Crockett had a significant impact on Plath's intellectual development. She was one of around 15 students who took his college-level seminar, referring to themselves as "Crocketteers" and reading up to fifty works of literature a year by major American British and Irish authors.

After Plath showed some of her early poems to Crockett in 1947, she was "overjoyed" when he read them to the class and said that his comments "encouraged me greatly". When her poetry collection The Collossus and Other Poems was published in 1960 she sent him a copy with the message "To Mr. Crockett, in whose classroom and wisdom these poems have root." In correspondence to a German acquaintance, Plath described Crockett as “an extraordinary man" who "does not try to indoctrinate us with ideas whatsoever, but is continually striving to get us to speak for ourselves and think also for ourselves”.

Later in 1952, writing in her journal, Plath refers to drinking sherry at Crockett's house and that he suggested graduate school in England.

A copy of Plath's The Colussus signed by the poet on her birthday, and with an inscription to Wilbury Crockett, was sold at Sotheby's in London in 2009 for £17,500.

== Politics ==
Crockett was a Democrat, which made him a target amongst the broader conservative Republican politics of Wellesley. He vocally opposed to American materialism. In 1952, at the height of McCarthyism, he was summoned to the Wellesley town board to discuss his politics and stated that he was a pacifist, and not a communist.
