= Two Lovers and a Beachcomber by the Real Sea =

1955 poem by Sylvia Plath

- by Sylvia Plath
- Country: United States
- Language: English
- Rhyme scheme: ABAB (slant rhyme)
- Publication date: 1955
- Lines: 24

"Two Lovers and a Beachcomber by the Real Sea" is a poem written by Sylvia Plath that was first published in 1955, the year she graduated from Smith College summa cum laude. An abstract poem about an absent lover, it uses clear, vivid language to describe seaside scenery, with "a grim insistence" on reality rather than romance and imagination.

The poem was awarded a 1955 Glascock Prize and appeared in Mademoiselle in August 1955, accompanying an article about the prize.

Plath used "Two Lovers and a Beachcomber by the Real Sea" as the title poem of a collection she submitted unsuccessfully to the Yale Series of Younger Poets, and as a working title for the collection that was eventually published as The Colossus. But Plath later came to be critical of the poem; in 1958 she mentioned it as an example of the "old crystal-brittle and sugar-faceted voice" that she wanted to move past.

== Text and analysis ==
The poem has six stanzas of four lines each, featuring slant rhyme. The regularity of the four-line stanzas, according to Linda Wagner-Martin, serves to suggest "a grim insistence". The poem's literary allusions include references to Herman Melville's Moby Dick, William Shakespeare's The Tempest, and T. S. Eliot's The Waste Land. Jon Rosenblatt draws a connection to the modernist poet Wallace Stevens's work about imagination, as reflected in Plath's lines "The imagination / shuts down its fabled summer house", while Philip Gardner says that the poem's title is also reminiscent of Stevens.

Plath's professor Alfred Young Fisher drew a parallel between the poem and James Joyce's Ulysses. In a manuscript held in the Sylvia Plath Collection at Smith College, his margin notes appear to compare the poem's last line "And that is that, is that, is that" with Joyce's repetition in the line "showed me her next year in drawers return next in her next her next".

As "Two Lovers and a Beachcomber" was written during Plath's college years, it can be considered part of her juvenilia, but it is not characteristic of this period of her work. Plath's husband Ted Hughes wrote that the poem was an example of Plath "anticipat[ing] herself" and "seems to belong quite a bit later". The Plath scholar Linda Wagner-Martin mentions this poem as an example of why more attention should be given to Plath's "juvenilia", saying that "Plath was a serious writer throughout her college years, beginning in 1950" and "her poetry should be considered 'mature' long before 1956".

The scholar Keith M. Sagar called it one of Plath's finest poems.

Wagner-Martin writes that the poem is typical of Plath's pre-Cambridge period and is "more about the poetic imagination than the two lovers of the title". Wagner-Martin praises the work's formal qualities but says that it is "wordy and convoluted", has an "aura of starched neatness", does not display any distinctive voice, and is typical of 1950s poems like those of Richard Eberhart, Louis Simpson, and Richard Wilbur. According to Wagner-Martin, "nothing about the poem ... reflects that its author is young, female, or American." She contrasts these characteristics with Plath's later poems such as "Lady Lazarus".

According to Jon Rosenblatt, the poem's reference to "fractured Venus" and its tension between "the desire to reclaim a lost, dead love and the simultaneous recognition that the dead cannot be recovered" hint at themes that are explored more fully in Plath's later poetry collection The Colossus.
