= The Lenny Henry Show =

- Genre: Sketch comedy, sitcom
- Written by: Lenny Henry; Chris Reddy (1985); Stan Hey (1987–1988); Andrew Nickolds (1987–1988)
- Directed by: Geoff Posner (1984–1988); Juliet May (1995); Michael Cumming (2004–2005)
- Starring: Lenny Henry
- Theme music composer: Simon Brint
- Country of origin: United Kingdom
- Original language: English
- No. of series: 7
- No. of episodes: 48

Production
- Executive producers: Kevin Lygo (1995); Polly McDonald (1995); Clive Tulloh (2004–2005); Mark Freeland (2004–2005)
- Producers: Geoff Posner (1984–1988); Geoff Atkinson (1995); Lissa Evans (2004–2005)
- Running time: 30 minutes
- Production companies: Crucial Films (1995); Tiger Aspect Productions (2004–2005)

Original release
- Network: BBC One
- Release: 4 September 1984 – 24 June 2005

Related
- Lenny Henry in Pieces (2000–2003)

The Lenny Henry Show is a comedy sketch show (and in its 1987–1988 incarnation, a sitcom) featuring Lenny Henry. It was originally broadcast between 1984 and 1988, and was later revived twice, in 1995 and 2004–2005.

== History ==
=== Original version (1984–1985) ===
The original version of the show ran for two series on BBC 1 in 1984 and 1985. Each series had six episodes. A 40-minute special was aired in December 1987. Recurring guests include Nicholas Lyndhurst (3 episodes) and Robbie Coltrane (2 episodes). Bands featured on the 1984 series included Musical Youth and Second Image.

=== Sitcom incarnation (1987–1988) ===
Two further series broadcast in 1987–1988 kept the same name, but followed a sitcom (rather than sketch-based) format. This version starred Henry as Delbert Wilkins, a well-meaning but trouble-prone pirate radio DJ at the fictional Brixton Broadcasting Corporation. At the end, Wilkins went "legit", gaining a job with the BBC World Service, and a son.

==== Main cast ====
- Lenny Henry as Delbert Wilkins
- Vas Blackwood as Winston
- Michael Mears as Alex
- Gina McKee as Julie
- Ellen Thomas as Rose
- Malcolm Rennie as Sgt. Lillie
- Pip Torrens as PC Monkhouse
- Louis Mahoney as Jake
- Nimmy March as Claudette

=== 1995 revival ===
The show was revived for one series in 1995; it failed to pick up audiences and was cancelled after its first run.

=== 2004–2005 revival ===
Lenny Henry revived the format once again in 2004 for two series of 8 episodes, containing stand-up and recurring sketches with recurring appearances by Gina Yashere.

=== 2020 Radio 4 revival ===
The show was revived for a six-part BBC Radio 4 series in 2020.

== Transmissions ==
=== Series ===
Series	Start date	End date	Episodes
BBC One
1	4 September 1984	9 October 1984	6
2	5 September 1985	10 October 1985	6
3	27 October 1987	1 December 1987	6
4	15 September 1988	3 November 1988	6
5	1 April 1995	6 May 1995	6
6	30 April 2004	18 June 2004	8
7	6 May 2005	24 June 2005	8
BBC Radio 4
1	25 August 2020	29 September 2020	6

=== Specials ===
Date	Entitle
28 December 1994	Christmas Special
28 December 1995	Christmas Special
