= Michael Mears =

British actor

- Born: United Kingdom
- Occupations: Actor, writer
- Known for: The Lenny Henry Show; Sylvia; The Crown

Michael Mears is a British actor and writer. He is known for such television series and films as Sharpe, The Lenny Henry Show, Andor, Fleabag, Paddington 2, Sylvia with Gwyneth Paltrow, The Oxford Murders, Parade's End with Benedict Cumberbatch, The Crown and Four Weddings and a Funeral.

Mears is also a stage actor known for such productions as William Shakespeare's Twelfth Night, Molière's The Hypochondriac, The Woman in Black as well as a two-year run with the Royal Shakespeare Company.

Mears is also known for performing in and writing BBC Radio 4 productions.

In September 2025, Mears was cast as Sir John Anderson in the upcoming film The Man with the Plan, directed by Christine Edzard.

== The Mistake ==
In the 2020s, Mears garnered critical acclaim with his two actor play, The Mistake, which he wrote and performed in, about the atomic bombings of Hiroshima and Nagasaki.

The Independent wrote in its review that The Mistake was, "A fascinating production about Hiroshima."

The Times called The Mistake, "A gripping piece of storytelling."
