= Sylvia Plath =

American poet and writer (1932–1963)

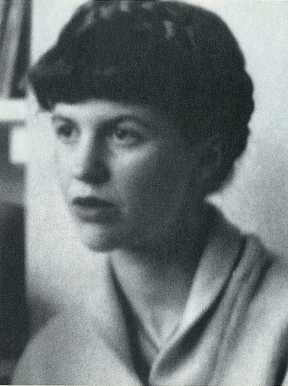
- Born: October 27, 1932; Boston, Massachusetts, U.S.
- Died: February 11, 1963 (aged 30); London, England
- Resting place: Heptonstall Church, Calderdale, West Yorkshire, England
- Education: Smith College (BA); Newnham College, Cambridge; Boston University
- Occupations: Poet; author
- Spouse: Ted Hughes (m. 1956)
- Children: Frieda Hughes; Nicholas Hughes
- Relatives: Otto Plath (father); Aurelia Schober (mother)
- Writing career
- Pen name: Victoria Lucas
- Language: English
- Period: 1960–1963
- Genres: Poetry; short story
- Notable works: The Colossus and Other Poems; The Bell Jar; Ariel
- Notable awards: Fulbright Scholarship; Glascock Prize 1955 Two Lovers and a Beachcomber by the Real Sea; Pulitzer Prize for Poetry 1982 The Collected Poems (posthumous)
- Movement: Confessional poetry

Sylvia Plath (October 27, 1932 – February 11, 1963) was an American poet and author. She is credited with advancing the genre of confessional poetry and her works include The Colossus and Other Poems (1960), Ariel (1965), and The Bell Jar (1963), a semi-autobiographical novel published one month before her suicide. The Collected Poems were published in 1981, which included previously unpublished works. For this collection Plath was awarded a Pulitzer Prize for Poetry in 1982, making her the fourth person to receive this honor posthumously.

Born in Jamaica Plain, Boston, Massachusetts, Plath graduated from Smith College in Northampton, Massachusetts, and then the University of Cambridge in England, where she was a Fulbright student at Newnham College. In 1959, Plath took a creative writing seminar taught by Robert Lowell at Boston University, alongside poets Anne Sexton and George Starbuck. Within this seminar, Plath, Lowell and Sexton, whilst starting with very different writing styles, each gravitated toward a new style of poetry dubbed confessional for its use of personal experience and its tendency to use a direct form of address. She married fellow poet Ted Hughes in 1956 in London. In 1957, they briefly moved to the United States, but moved back to England in the winter of 1959. They had two children, Frieda and Nicholas, before separating in 1962.

Critic Al Alvarez views Plath as part of a generation that helped establish a new artistic myth, in contrast to the Eliot generation, which championed the impersonality of art and the "extinction of personality". In his view Plath and her contemporaries fused their inner lives with their artistic output. Some in the feminist movement saw Plath as speaking for their experience, as a "symbol of blighted female genius." Plath suffered a lifelong battle with severe depression, often characterized as a bipolar-type illness, leading to multiple traumatic treatments with early model electroconvulsive therapy (ECT). She died by suicide at age 30 in London on February 11, 1963.

== Biography ==
=== Early life and education ===
Plath was born on October 27, 1932, in Jamaica Plain, Boston, Massachusetts. Her mother, Aurelia Schober Plath (1906–1994), was the American-born daughter of Austrian immigrants, and her father, Otto Plath (1885–1940), was from Grabow in Prussia, German Empire. Plath's father was an entomologist and a professor of biology at Boston University who wrote a book about bumblebees in 1934.

On April 27, 1935, Plath's brother Warren Joseph was born. In 1936 the family moved from 24 Prince Street in Jamaica Plain to 92 Johnson Avenue, Winthrop, Massachusetts. Since 1920, Plath's maternal grandparents, the Schobers, had lived in a section of Winthrop called Point Shirley, a location mentioned in Plath's poetry.

Based on her poetry and journals, the power dynamic between Plath's parents was characterized by a strict, patriarchal structure in which her father, Otto Plath, held absolute authority, while her mother, Aurelia Plath, was perceived as a subservient yet ultimately managing figure. Plath's work, particularly “Daddy”, presents this dynamic as a source of deep emotional trauma where her father is viewed as an oppressive “god” and her mother as a passive figure.

Otto Plath died on November 5, 1940, a week and a half after his daughter's eighth birthday, of complications following the amputation of a foot due to untreated diabetes. He had become ill shortly after a close friend died of lung cancer. Comparing the similarities between his friend's symptoms and his own, Otto became convinced that he, too, had lung cancer and did not seek treatment until his diabetes had progressed too far. Plath's outlook on religion and lifestyle changed dramatically due to her father's strict atheism and controlling demeanor, and his premature death led Plath to believe her “sky is empty.” Her father was buried in Winthrop Cemetery in Massachusetts. A visit to her father's grave later prompted Plath to write the poem "Electra on Azalea Path".

After Otto's death, Aurelia moved her children and her parents to 26 Elmwood Road, Wellesley, Massachusetts, in 1942. Plath commented in her essay "Ocean 1212-W", one of her final works, that her first nine years "sealed themselves off like a ship in a bottle—beautiful, inaccessible, obsolete, a fine, white flying myth."

Plath published her first poem at the age of eight in the Boston Herald's children's section. Over the next few years, Plath published multiple poems in regional magazines and newspapers. At age 11, Plath began keeping a journal. In addition to writing, she showed early promise as an artist, winning an award for her paintings from the Scholastic Art & Writing Awards in 1947. "Even in her youth, Plath was ambitiously driven to succeed."

Plath attended Bradford Senior High School, which is now Wellesley High School in Wellesley, Massachusetts, graduating in 1950. An influential English teacher was Wilbury Crockett, who she referred to as "my own Mr. Crockett." Just after graduating from high school, she had her first national publication in The Christian Science Monitor.

=== College years and depression ===
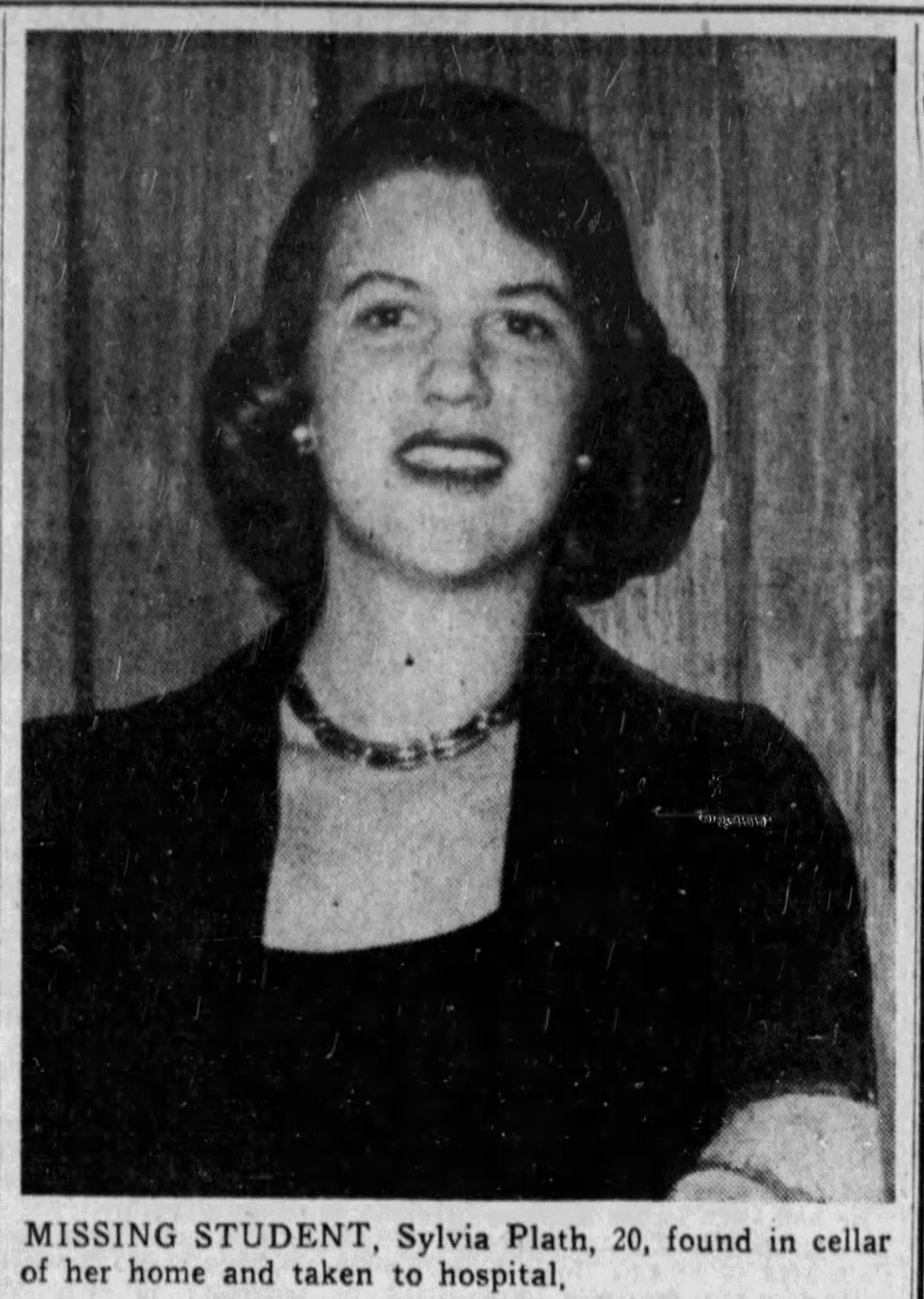
Newspaper clipping, August 26, 1953

In 1950, Plath attended Smith College, a private women's liberal arts college in Massachusetts, where she excelled academically. While at Smith, she first lived in Haven House and later in Lawrence House, where a plaque can be found outside her old room. She edited The Smith Review. After her third year of college, Plath was awarded a coveted position as a guest editor at Mademoiselle magazine, during which she spent a month in New York City. Plath was one of 20 women offered the position, which entailed writing short stories and interviewing people such as Elizabeth Bowen in Cambridge. The experience was not what she had hoped for, and many of the events that took place during that summer were later used as inspiration for her novel The Bell Jar.

She was furious at not being at a meeting that Mademoiselle editor Cyrilly Abels had arranged with Welsh poet Dylan Thomas, a writer whose work she loved, according to one of her boyfriends, "more than life itself." She loitered around the White Horse Tavern and the Chelsea Hotel for two days, hoping to meet Thomas, but he was already on his way home. A few weeks later, she slashed her legs "to see if she had enough courage to kill herself." (Note: "On 15 July, when Sylvia came downstairs, Aurelia noticed that her daughter had a couple of partially healed scars on her legs. After being questioned about them, Sylvia told her mother that she had gashed herself in an effort to see if she had the guts. Then she took hold of Aurelia's hand and said: 'Oh, Mother, the world is so rotten! I want to die! Let's die together!'") During this time, she was not accepted into a Harvard University writing seminar with author Frank O'Connor. Following ECT for depression, Plath made her first medically documented suicide attempt on August 24, 1953, by crawling under the front porch and taking her mother's sleeping pills.

She survived this first suicide attempt, later writing that she "blissfully succumbed to the whirling blackness that I honestly believed was eternal oblivion." She spent the next six months in psychiatric care, receiving more electric and insulin shock treatment under the care of Ruth Beuscher. Her stay at McLean Hospital and her Smith scholarship were paid for by the author Olive Higgins Prouty, who had also recovered from a mental breakdown. According to Plath's biographer Andrew Wilson, Olive Higgins Prouty "would take Dr. Tillotson to task for the badly managed ECT, blaming him for Sylvia's suicide attempt."

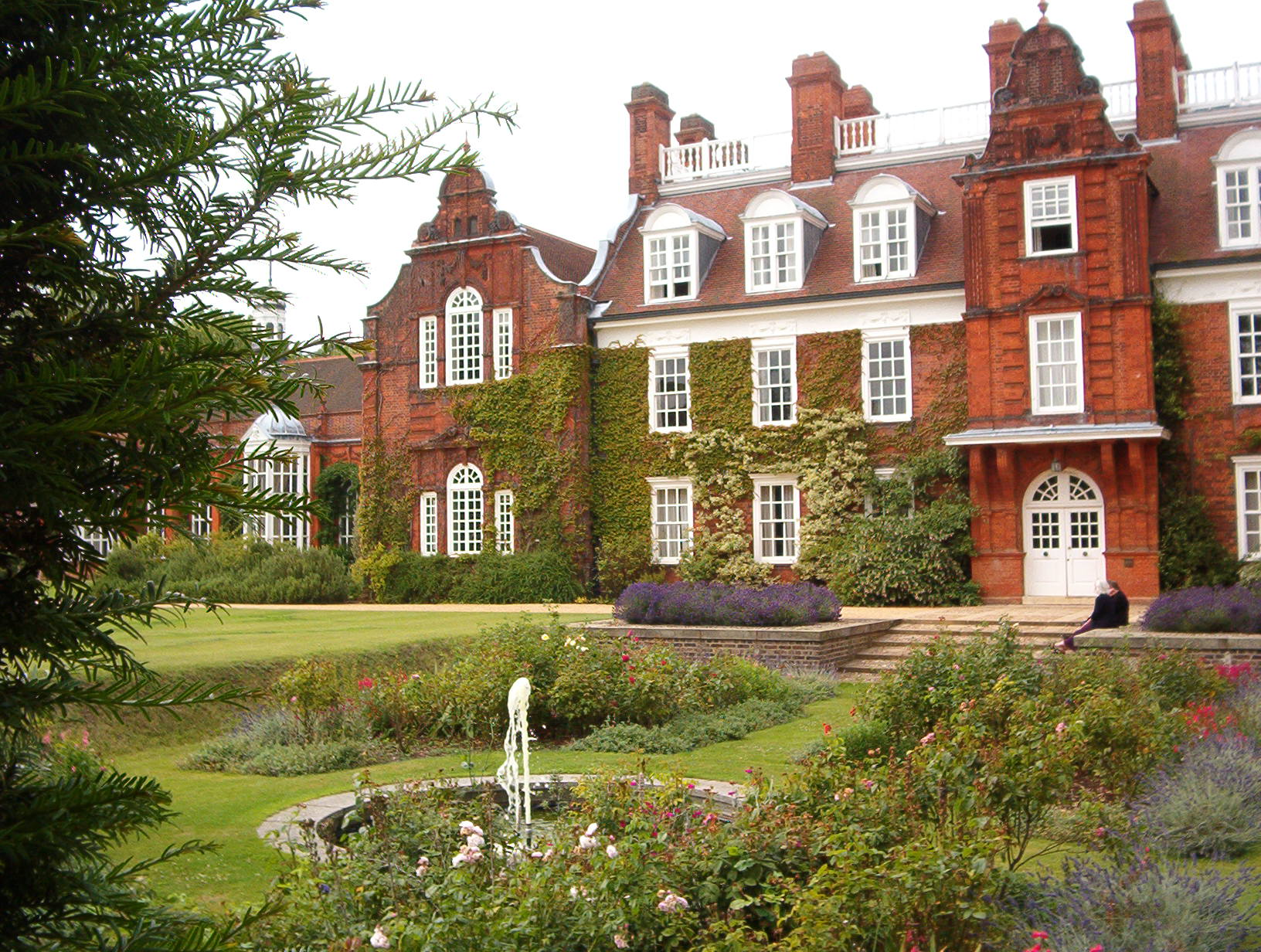
Sidgwick Hall at Newnham College, Cambridge

Plath seemed to make a good recovery and returned to college. In January 1955, she submitted her thesis The Magic Mirror: A Study of the Double in Two of Dostoyevsky's Novels, and in June graduated from Smith with an A.B., summa cum laude. She was a member of the Phi Beta Kappa academic honor society and had an IQ of around 160.

She obtained a Fulbright Scholarship to study at Newnham College, one of the two women-only colleges of the University of Cambridge in England, where she lived in Whitstead, a detached house situated on the edge of the college grounds. Plath continued actively writing poetry and publishing her work in the student newspaper Varsity. At Newnham, she studied with Dorothea Krook, whom she held in high regard. She spent her first-year winter and spring holidays traveling around Europe.

=== Career and marriage ===
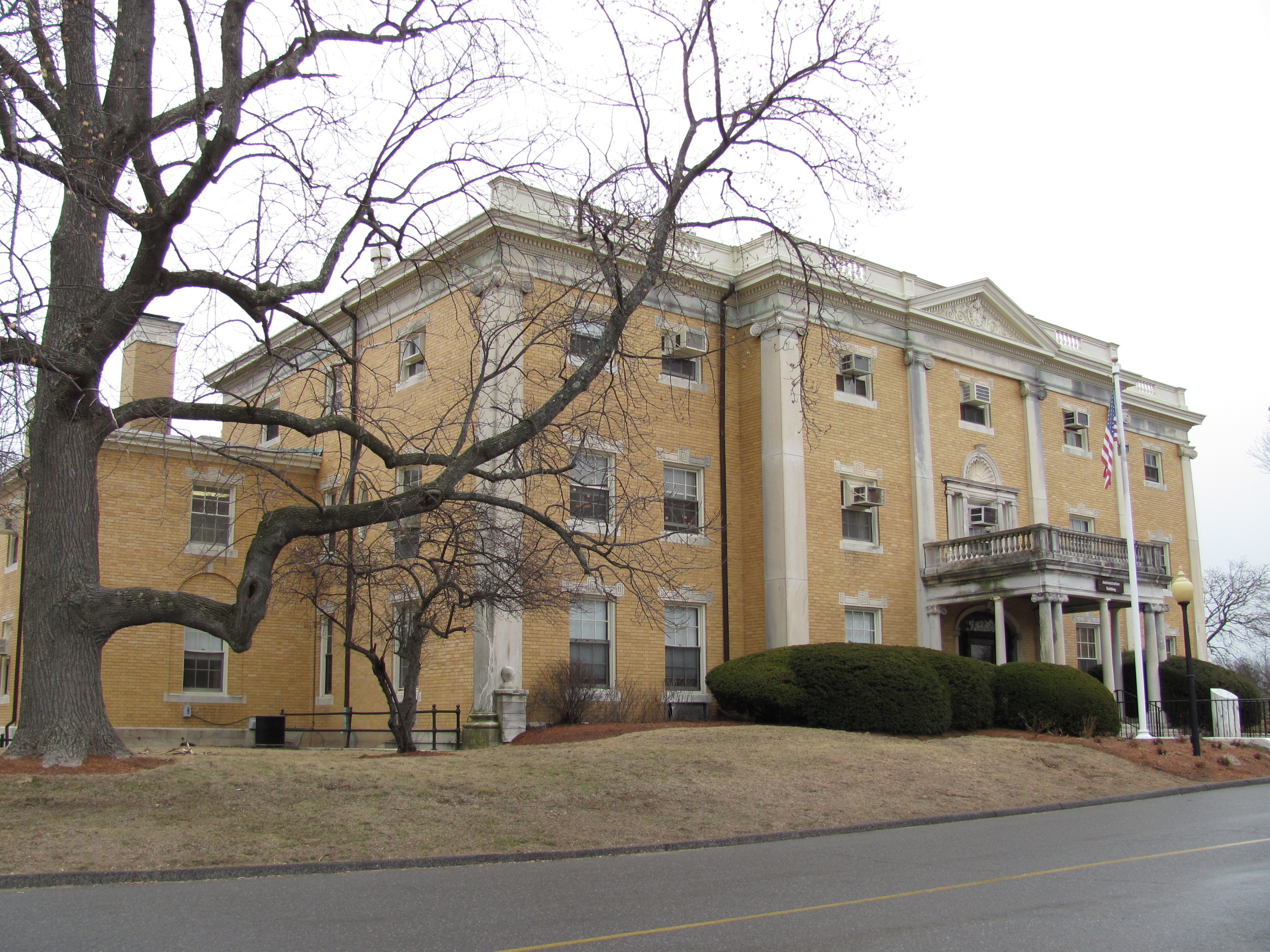
Plath's stay at McLean Hospital inspired her novel The Bell Jar

Plath met poet Ted Hughes on February 25, 1956, at a party to launch a poetry journal, St. Botolph's Review. In a 1961 BBC interview now held by the British Library Sound Archive, Plath describes how she met Hughes:

I'd read some of Ted's poems in this magazine and I was very impressed and I wanted to meet him. I went to this little celebration and that's actually where we met... Then we saw a great deal of each other. Ted came back to Cambridge and suddenly we found ourselves getting married a few months later... We kept writing poems to each other. Then it just grew out of that, I guess, a feeling that we both were writing so much and having such a fine time doing it, we decided that this should keep on.

Plath described Hughes as "a singer, story-teller, lion and world-wanderer" with "a voice like the thunder of God."

The couple were married only four months after they met, on June 16, 1956, at St George the Martyr in Holborn, London, and in honor of Bloomsday, with Plath's mother as the sole witness. They spent their honeymoon in Paris and Benidorm, Spain. Plath returned to Newnham in October to begin her second year. During this time, they both became deeply interested in astrology and the supernatural, using ouija boards.

In June 1957, Plath and Hughes moved to the United States; beginning in September, Plath taught at Smith College, her alma mater. She found it difficult to both teach and have enough time and energy to write, and in the middle of 1958, the couple moved to Boston, where they lived at 9 Willow St. in Beacon Hill. Plath took a job as a receptionist in the psychiatric unit of Massachusetts General Hospital and in the evenings attended a creative writing seminar given by poet Robert Lowell (also attended by the writers Anne Sexton and George Starbuck).

Both Lowell and Sexton encouraged Plath to write from her personal experience. She openly discussed her depression with Lowell and her suicide attempt with Sexton, who led her to write from a more female perspective. Plath began to consider herself as a more serious, focused writer. At this time, Plath and Hughes met the poet W.S. Merwin, who admired their work and was to remain a lifelong friend. Plath resumed psychoanalytic treatment in December, working with Ruth Beuscher.

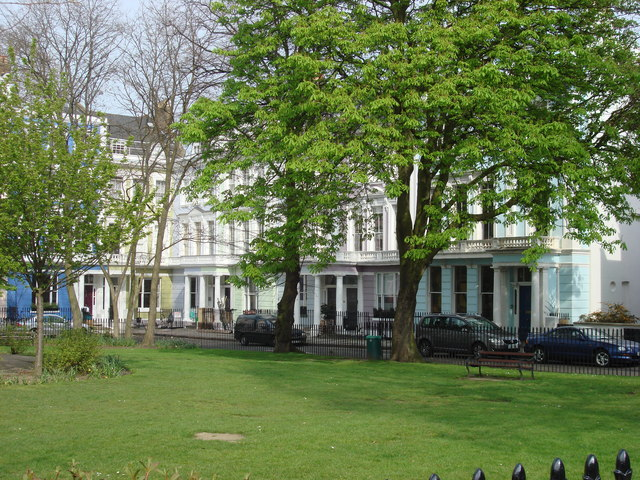
Chalcot Square, near Primrose Hill in London, Plath and Hughes's home from 1959

In summer 1959, Plath and Hughes went on an eight-week camping trip across Canada, the United States and Mexico, after which they stayed at the Yaddo artist colony in Saratoga Springs, New York, in fall. Plath stated that at Yaddo she learned "to be true to my own weirdnesses", but she remained anxious about writing confessionally, from deeply personal and private material.

The couple moved back to England in December 1959 and lived in London at 3 Chalcot Square, near the Primrose Hill area of Regent's Park, where an English Heritage plaque records Plath's residence from 1960 to 1961. Their daughter Frieda Rebecca was born on April 1, 1960, and in October, Plath published The Colossus, her first collection of poetry.

In February 1961, Plath's second pregnancy ended in miscarriage; several of her poems, including "Parliament Hill Fields", address this event. In August, she finished her semi-autobiographical novel The Bell Jar; immediately afterward, the family moved to Court Green in the small market town of North Tawton, Devon. Her son Nicholas Farrar was born on January 17, 1962. In mid-1962, Plath and Hughes began to keep bees, which would become the subject of many of her poems, including “Beekeeper’s Daughter,” “Arrival of the Bee Box,” “The Bee Meeting,” “Stings,” and “Swarm.”

Before moving away from London in August 1961, the couple sublet their flat at Chalcot Square to the Canadian poet David Wevill and his wife Assia (née Gutmann) Wevill. The couples became friends, and Plath and Hughes invited the Wevills to visit them at their new house in Devon in May 1962. Hughes was immediately struck with Assia, as she was with him. In July 1962, Plath discovered Hughes was having an affair with Wevill. In September, as a last attempt to save their relationship, Plath and Hughes traveled to Cleggan in Ireland to visit the poet Richard Murphy. The pair then embarked on a ten-day trip to Spain, where Plath and Hughes previously spent their honeymoon. In October, Plath and Hughes separated for good, and Hughes moved back to London, leaving Plath and their children behind in Devon.

In the final months of her life, beginning in October 1962, Plath experienced a great burst of creativity and composed most of the poems on which her reputation now rests, writing at least 26 of the poems of her second collection Ariel, which would be published posthumously (1965 in the UK, 1966 in the US). In December 1962, she returned alone to London with their children and rented, on a five-year lease, a flat at 23 Fitzroy Road—around the corner from her previous flat at Chalcot Square. William Butler Yeats once lived in the house, which bears an English Heritage blue plaque for the Irish poet. Plath was pleased by this fact and considered it a good omen.

The winter of 1962–1963 was one of the coldest on record in the UK; the pipes froze, the children—now two years old and nine months—were often sick, and the house had no telephone. Her depression returned, but she kept on writing poetry, which would be published after her death. Her only novel, The Bell Jar, was published in January 1963 under the pen name Victoria Lucas, to protect the identities of the real people the characters were based on and Plath herself in case of poor reception. The Bell Jar was met with critical indifference.

=== Final depressive episode and death ===
Plath's live-in nurse was due to arrive at nine on the morning of February 11, 1963, to help with the care of her children. Upon arrival, she could not get into the flat, but eventually gained access with the help of a workman. They found Plath dead with her head on the oven door, having sealed the kitchen door and the room upstairs with her sleeping children inside with tape, towels, and cloths. She was 30 years old.

Before her death, Plath had tried at least once to take her own life. On August 24, 1953, she overdosed on sleeping pills. In June 1962, she drove her car off the side of the road into a nearby clearing after learning about Hughes' and Wevill's affair. The poetry critic and Plath's friend Al Alvarez always maintained that Plath told him it was a suicide attempt, but another friend claimed that Plath herself described the incident as "not a conscious suicide but a blind destructive urge over which she had no conscious control" and Hughes himself told Alvarez that it was a minor accident due to a "feverish blackout".

In January 1963, Plath spoke with John Horder, her general practitioner. She described the current depressive episode she was experiencing; it had been ongoing for six or seven months. While for most of the time she had been able to continue working, her depression had worsened and become severe, "marked by constant agitation, suicidal thoughts and inability to cope with daily life." Plath struggled with insomnia, taking medication at night to induce sleep, and frequently woke up early. She had lost 20 pounds (9 kg) in a short time. However, she continued to take care of her physical appearance and did not outwardly speak of feeling guilty or unworthy.

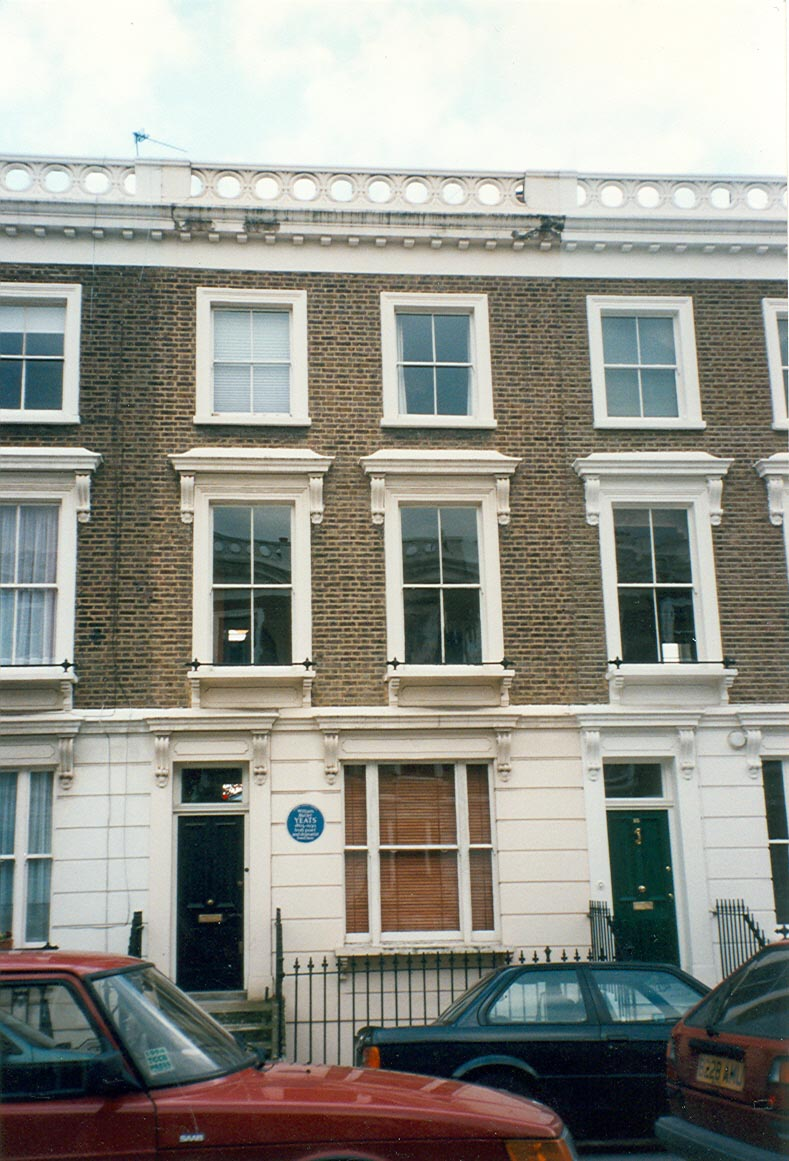
23 Fitzroy Road, near Primrose Hill, London, where Plath died by suicide

Horder prescribed her an anti-depressant, a monoamine oxidase inhibitor, a few days before her suicide. Knowing she was at risk with two young children, he made strenuous efforts to have her admitted to a hospital; when that failed, he arranged for a live-in nurse.

Hughes claimed in a hand-written note to the literary critic Keith Sagar, discovered in 2001, that the anti-depressants prescribed were a "key factor" in Plath's suicide. He said Plath had previously had an adverse reaction to a prescription she had taken when they lived in the U.S. These pills were sold in England under a different name, and although Hughes did not name the pills explicitly, he claimed a new doctor had prescribed them to Plath without realizing she had taken them before with adverse effects. Several commentators have argued that because anti-depressants may take up to three weeks to take effect, her prescription from Horder would not have taken full effect prior to her death; however, others have pointed out that adverse effects of anti-depressants can begin immediately.

Plath's intentions have been debated. That morning, she asked her downstairs neighbor, art historian Trevor Thomas (1907–1993), what time he would be leaving. She also left a note reading "Call Dr. Horder", including the doctor's phone number. It is argued Plath turned on the toxic coal gas oven at a time when Thomas would have been likely to see the note, but the escaping gas seeped downstairs and also rendered Thomas unconscious while he slept. However, in her biography Giving Up: The Last Days of Sylvia Plath, Plath's friend Jillian Becker wrote, "According to Mr. Goodchild, a police officer attached to the coroner's office... [Plath] had thrust her head far into the gas oven... [and] had really meant to die." Horder also believed her intention was clear. He stated that "No one who saw the care with which the kitchen was prepared could have interpreted her action as anything but an irrational compulsion." Plath had described the quality of her despair as "owl's talons clenching my heart".

=== Aftermath ===
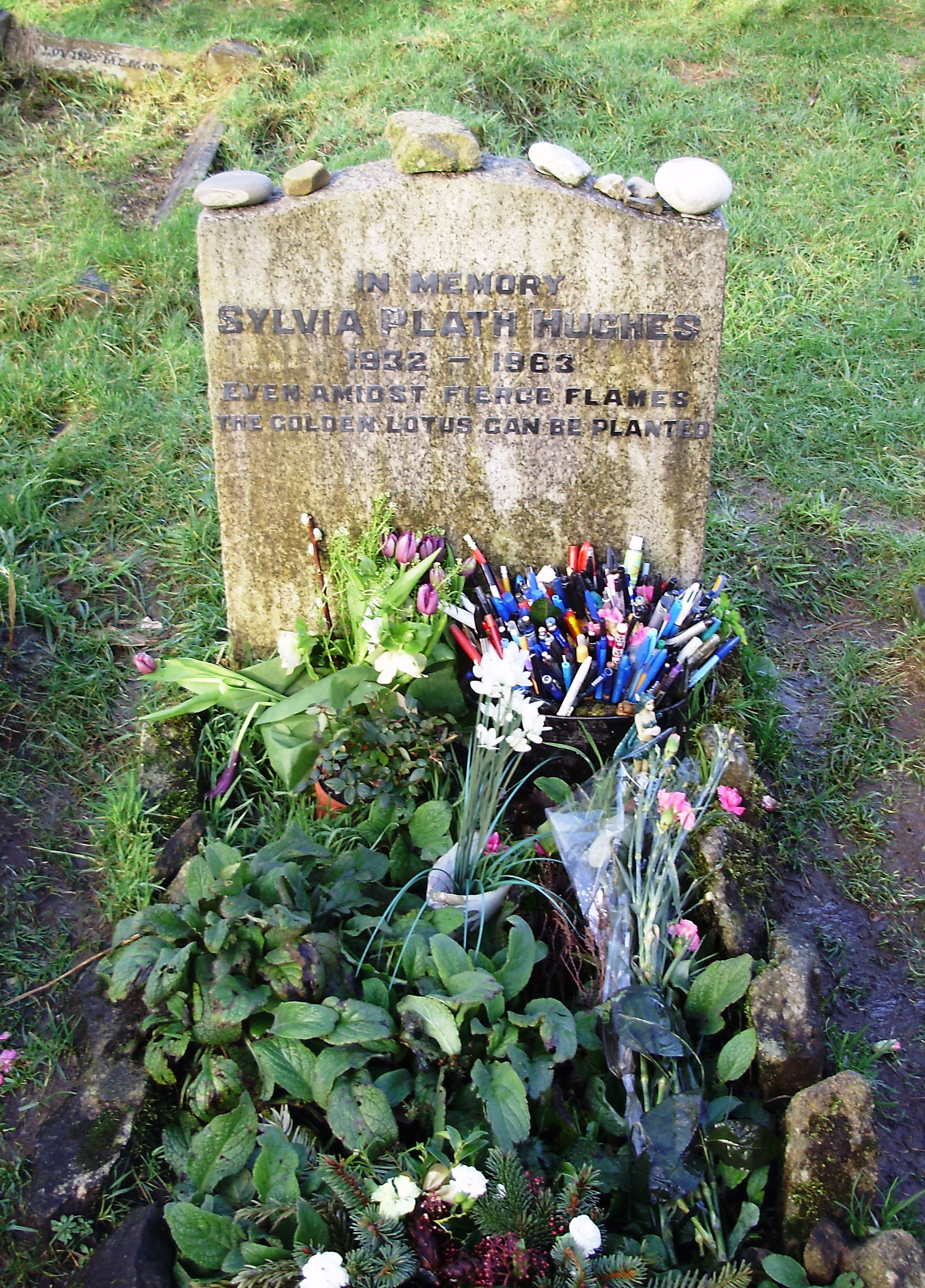
Plath's grave at a church in Heptonstall, West Yorkshire

An inquest was held on February 15 and concluded that the cause of death was suicide by carbon monoxide poisoning. Plath's gravestone in Heptonstall's parish churchyard of St. Thomas the Apostle bears the inscription that Hughes chose for her: "Even amidst fierce flames the golden lotus can be planted." Biographers have attributed the source of the quote to the 16th-century novel Journey to the West written by Wu Cheng'en.

Eight years after the death of Plath, Al Alvarez wrote that Plath's suicide was not intentional and was "a cry for help which fatally misfired." This prompted an angry response from Hughes who demanded that this claim be withdrawn from wider publication. In a BBC interview in March 2000, Alvarez spoke about his failure to recognize Plath's depression, saying he regretted his inability to offer her emotional support.

Plath's daughter Frieda Hughes is a writer and artist, who has now released seven children's books. She has no children and resides in Abermule, Powys, Wales. On March 16, 2009, Plath's son Nicholas Hughes, who was a fisheries biologist, died by suicide at his home in Fairbanks, Alaska, following a history of depression.

== Works ==
Plath wrote poetry from the age of eight, her first poem appearing in the Boston Herald. By the time she arrived at Smith College, she had written over 50 short stories, and her work had been published in numerous magazines. At Smith, she majored in English literature and won all the major prizes in writing and scholarship, including literary prizes for her poetry. Additionally, she received a summer editor position at the young women's magazine Mademoiselle. On her graduation in 1955, she won the Glascock Prize for her poem "Two Lovers and a Beachcomber by the Real Sea". Later, at Cambridge, she wrote for the university publication Varsity.

Alvarez clearly views Plath as part of a generation that helped establish a new artistic myth. In contrast to the Eliot generation, which championed the impersonality of art and the "extinction of personality" in creative expression, Plath and her contemporaries fused their inner lives with their artistic output. As Alvarez puts it, this is a form of art in which "the barriers between the artist's work and his life are forever shifting and crumbling."

=== The Colossus ===
Nights, I squat in the cornucopia
Of your left ear, out of the wind,

Counting the red stars and those of plum-color.
The sun rises under the pillar of your tongue.
My hours are married to shadow.
No longer do I listen for the scrape of a keel
On the blank stones of the landing.

— from "The Colossus",
The Colossus and Other Poems, 1960

The Colossus and Other Poems was Plath's first book-length publication, released in October 1960 and in the US in 1962. It was the only volume of poetry published during her lifetime. While she had previously published many poems in magazines, this was her first bound collection. The collection contains 44 poems, including well-known pieces like "The Colossus" and "The Disquieting Muses". The Colossus marked her debut in the literary world with a style that was heavily praised for its craft, even if it differed in tone from her later, most famous work.

By the time Heinemann published The Colossus and Other Poems in the UK in late 1960, Plath had been short-listed several times in the Yale Younger Poets book competition and had her work printed in Harper's, The Spectator, and The Times Literary Supplement. All the poems in The Colossus had been printed in major U.S. and British journals, and she had a contract with The New Yorker. It is, however, her 1965 collection Ariel, published posthumously, on which Plath's reputation essentially rests. "Often, her work is singled out for the intense coupling of its violent or disturbed imagery and its playful use of alliteration and rhyme."

The Colossus received largely positive UK reviews, highlighting Plath's voice as new and strong, individual and American in tone. Peter Dickinson at Punch called the collection "a real find" and "exhilarating to read", full of "clean, easy verse". Bernard Bergonzi at the Manchester Guardian wrote the book was an "outstanding technical accomplishment" with a "virtuoso quality". From the point of publication, she became a presence on the poetry scene. The book was published in America in 1962 to less-glowing reviews. While her craft was generally praised, her writing was viewed by some critics at the time as more derivative of other poets.

The Colossus can be seen as an intense, often autobiographical explanation of her personal struggles, including deep mourning for her father, anxieties about marriage and the psychological constraints of being a woman.

=== The Bell Jar ===
I saw my life branching out before me like the green fig tree in the story. From the tip of every branch, like a fat purple fig, a wonderful future beckoned and winked [...] as I sat there, unable to decide [which fig], the figs began to wrinkle and go black, and, one by one, they plopped to the ground at my feet.

— The Bell Jar, 1963

Plath's semi-autobiographical novel—her mother had tried to block its publication—was published under a pseudonym in the UK in 1963, under her real name in 1966, and in the US in 1971. The Bell Jar has sold over three million copies and in 1979 was produced into a film directed by Larry Peerce and starring Marilyn Hassett as 'Esther'. Describing the compilation of the book to her mother, she wrote, "What I've done is to throw together events from my own life, fictionalizing to add color—it's a pot boiler really, but I think it will show how isolated a person feels when she is suffering a breakdown ... I've tried to picture my world and the people in it as seen through the distorting lens of a bell jar". She described her novel as "an autobiographical apprentice work which I had to write in order to free myself from the past". The Bell Jar predominately focuses on the summer of her internship at ‘Mademoiselle’ as a guest editor. Plath dated a Yale senior named Dick Norton during her junior year. Norton, upon whom the character of Buddy in The Bell Jar is based, contracted tuberculosis and was treated at the Ray Brook Sanatorium. While visiting Norton, Plath broke her leg skiing, an incident that was fictionalized in the novel. Plath also used the novel to highlight the issue of women in the workforce during the 1950s. After her summer in the editorship, she was denied a place in Frank O'Connor's summer writing class at Harvard. This sparked her mental decline, consequently leading to her first attempt of suicide by taking sleeping pills and barricading herself in the basement crawlspace. She strongly believed in women's abilities to be writers and editors while society forced them to fulfill secretarial roles:

Now with me, writing is the first delight in life. I want time and money to write, both very necessary. I will not sacrifice my time to learn shorthand because I do not want any of the jobs which shorthand would open up, although those jobs are no doubt very interesting for girls who want them. I do not want the rigid hours of a magazine or publishing job. I do not want to type other people's letters and read their manuscripts. I want to type my own and write my own. So secretarial training is out for me. That I know.

— Sylvia Plath's letter to her mother, 10 February 1955

=== Double Exposure ===
In 1963, after The Bell Jar was published, Plath began working on another literary work, titled Double Exposure, which was never published. According to Ted Hughes in 1979, Plath left behind a typescript of "some 130 pages", but in 1995 he spoke of just "sixty, seventy pages". His sister, Olwyn Hughes, wrote in 2003 that the typescript may have consisted of the first two chapters, and did not exceed sixty pages.

=== Ariel ===
And I
Am the arrow,

The dew that flies
Suicidal, at one with the drive
Into the red

Eye, the cauldron of morning.

— from the poem "Ariel", October 12, 1962

Plath's second volume of poems, titled Ariel, was published by Faber & Faber in 1965, two years after her death. Ted Hughes made substantial changes to the manuscript she left on her desk on the night of her death. He rearranged the intended order of the poems, dropping some pieces, and adding others. The publication precipitated Plath's rise to fame. The poems in Ariel mark a departure from her earlier work into a more personal arena of poetry. Robert Lowell's poetry may have played a part in this shift as she cited Lowell's 1959 book Life Studies as a significant influence, in an interview just before her death. The impact of Ariel was dramatic, with its dark and potentially autobiographical descriptions of mental illness in poems such as "Tulips", "Daddy" and "Lady Lazarus". Plath's work is often held within the genre of confessional poetry and the style of her work compared to other contemporaries, such as Lowell and W. D. Snodgrass. Plath's close friend Al Alvarez, who wrote about her extensively, said of her later work: "Plath's case is complicated by the fact that, in her mature work, she deliberately used the details of her everyday life as raw material for her art. A casual visitor or unexpected telephone call, a cut, a bruise, a kitchen bowl, a candlestick—everything became usable, charged with meaning, transformed. Her poems are full of references and images that seem impenetrable at this distance, but which could mostly be explained in footnotes by a scholar with full access to the details of her life." Many of Plath's later poems deal with what one critic calls the "domestic surreal" in which Plath takes everyday elements of life and twists the images, giving them an almost nightmarish quality. Plath's poem "Morning Song" from Ariel is regarded as one of her finest poems on freedom of expression of an artist.

Plath's fellow confessional poet and friend Anne Sexton commented: "Sylvia and I would talk at length about our first suicide, in detail and in depth—between the free potato chips. Suicide is, after all, the opposite of the poem. Sylvia and I often talked opposites. We talked death with burned-up intensity, both of us drawn to it like moths to an electric lightbulb, sucking on it. She told the story of her first suicide in sweet and loving detail, and her description in The Bell Jar is just that same story." The confessional interpretation of Plath's work has led to some dismissing certain aspects of her work as an exposition of sentimentalist melodrama; in 2010, for example, Theodore Dalrymple asserted that Plath had been the "patron saint of self-dramatisation" and of self-pity. Revisionist critics such as Tracy Brain have, however, argued against a tightly autobiographical interpretation of Plath's material. In January 2004, Brian Patten, writing for UK's The Independent, ranked Ariel as the third best book of modern poetry among its "Ten Best Modern Poetry Books", saying: "The book burns with hate, love, self-loathing and anger. Plath wandered down among the roots of poetry, illuminating it - and then became her own fuel." The same year, Faber published Ariel: The Restored Edition, with a foreword by Frieda Hughes. The new edition for the first time restored the selection and arrangement of the poems as Plath had left them, and included poems previously omitted by Hughes.

=== Other works ===
In 1971, the volumes Winter Trees and Crossing the Water were published in the UK, including nine previously unseen poems from the original manuscript of Ariel. Writing in New Statesman, fellow poet Peter Porter wrote:

Crossing the Water is full of perfectly realised works. Its most striking impression is of a front-rank artist in the process of discovering her true power. Such is Plath's control that the book possesses a singularity and certainty which should make it as celebrated as The Colossus or Ariel.

In 1977, Johnny Panic and the Bible of Dreams, a collection of short stories, other prose writings and diary excerpts was published by Faber & Faber. In 2024, Faber published a new volume titled The Collected Prose of Sylvia Plath, edited by Peter K. Steinberg, which contains nearly 217 mostly previously unpublished works written by Plath, such as fiction, nonfiction, texts from the Smith College Press Board, book reviews, and story fragments, and provides a better awareness and understanding of Plath's efforts in the various genres represented.

The Collected Poems, published in 1981, edited and introduced by Ted Hughes, contained poetry written from 1956 until her death. Plath posthumously was awarded the Pulitzer Prize for Poetry in 1982. In 2006, Anna Journey, then a graduate student at Virginia Commonwealth University, discovered a previously unpublished sonnet written by Plath titled "Ennui". The poem, composed during Plath's early years at Smith College, was published in the online journal Blackbird. (Note: Two poems titled Ennui (I) and Ennui (II) are listed in a partial catalogue of Plath's juvenilia in the Collected Poems. A note explains that the texts of all but half a dozen of the many pieces listed are in the Sylvia Plath Archive of juvenilia in the Lilly Library at Indiana University. The rest are with the Sylvia Plath Estate.)

=== Letters and journals ===
Heavily abridged versions of Plath's letters to her family, mainly to her mother and brother, were published in 1975, edited and selected by her mother Aurelia Plath. The collection Letters Home: Correspondence 1950–1963 came out partly in response to the strong public reaction to the publication of The Bell Jar in America.

Plath's most frequent correspondent was her mother, who received 230 letters. There are spaces and gaps in Plath's communication with people; for example, when Plath lived in Northampton and Boston, communication was made frequently by telephone. Most of her letters have been published in a two-volume edition, including her conversations with friends, teachers, and editors, as well as controversial letters to her therapist.

In 2017 and 2018, two new volumes of letters, The Letters of Sylvia Plath Volume I: 1940–1956 and The Letters of Sylvia Plath Volume II: 1956–1963, edited by Peter K. Steinberg and Karen V. Kukil, were published by Faber. With more than 2,500 pages, both volumes contain complete and unabridged letters to her family, friends, mentors and teachers, ex-boyfriends and to Ted Hughes.

Plath started writing in her diary on January 1, 1944, at the age of 11 and continued until her death by suicide in February 1963. Her early diaries remain unpublished and are currently at Indiana University Bloomington. Her adult diaries, starting from her first year at Smith College in 1950, were published in 1982 as The Journals of Sylvia Plath, edited by Frances McCullough, with Ted Hughes as consulting editor. In 1982, when Smith College acquired Plath's remaining journals, Hughes sealed two of them until February 11, 2013, the 50th anniversary of Plath's death.

During the last years of his life, Hughes began working on a fuller publication of Plath's journals. In 1998, shortly before his death, he unsealed the two journals, and passed the project onto his children by Plath, Frieda and Nicholas, who passed it on to Karen V. Kukil, who finished her editing in December 1999. In 2000 Anchor Books published The Unabridged Journals of Sylvia Plath. More than half of the new volume contained newly released material; the American author Joyce Carol Oates hailed the publication as a "genuine literary event". Hughes faced criticism for his role in handling the journals: He claims to have destroyed Plath's last journal, which contained entries from the winter of 1962 up to her death. In the foreword of the 1982 version, he writes "I destroyed [the last of her journals] because I did not want her children to have to read it (in those days I regarded forgetfulness as an essential part of survival)."

== Hughes controversies ==
And here you come, with a cup of tea
Wreathed in steam.
The blood jet is poetry,
There is no stopping it.
You hand me two children, two roses.

— from "Kindness", written February 1, 1963. Ariel

As Hughes and Plath were legally married at the time of her death, Hughes inherited the Plath estate, including all her written work. He has been condemned repeatedly for burning Plath's last journal, saying he "did not want her children to have to read it". Hughes lost another journal and an unfinished novel, and instructed that a collection of Plath's papers and journals should not be released until 2013. He has been accused of attempting to control the estate for his own ends, although royalties from Plath's poetry were placed into a trust account for their two children, Frieda and Nicholas.

Plath's gravestone has been repeatedly vandalized by those aggrieved that "Hughes" is written on the stone; they have attempted to chisel it off, leaving only the name "Sylvia Plath". Plath and Hughes's daughter Frieda has condemned the defacement. When Hughes's mistress Assia Wevill died by suicide and killed their four-year-old daughter Shura in 1969, this practice intensified, as Wevill's death led to claims that Hughes had been abusive to both Plath and Wevill. After each defacement, Hughes had the damaged stone removed, sometimes leaving the site unmarked during repair. Outraged mourners accused Hughes in the media of dishonoring Plath's name by removing the stone.

Radical feminist poet Robin Morgan published the poem "Arraignment", which is often interpreted as an accusation that Hughes metaphorically murdered Plath. It concludes by imagining a group of women disarming him of "that weapon with which he tortured us" and sewing it into his mouth, and then blowing out his brains . Hughes threatened to sue Morgan. The book was withdrawn by the publisher Random House, but it remained in circulation. Other Plath supporters threatened to kill Hughes in Plath's name and pursue a conviction for murder.

In 1989, with Hughes under public attack, a battle raged in the letters pages of The Guardian and The Independent. In The Guardian on April 20, 1989, Hughes wrote the article "The Place Where Sylvia Plath Should Rest in Peace": "In the years soon after [Plath's] death, when scholars approached me, I tried to take their apparently serious concern for the truth about Sylvia Plath seriously. But I learned my lesson early...If I tried too hard to tell them exactly how something happened, in the hope of correcting some fantasy, I was quite likely to be accused of trying to suppress Free Speech. In general, my refusal to have anything to do with the Plath Fantasia has been regarded as an attempt to suppress Free Speech...The Fantasia about Sylvia Plath is more needed than the facts. Where that leaves respect for the truth of her life (and of mine), or for her memory, or for the literary tradition, I do not know."

Still the subject of speculation and opprobrium in 1998, Hughes published Birthday Letters that year, his own collection of 88 poems about his relationship with Plath. Hughes had published very little about his experience of the marriage and Plath's suicide, and the book caused a sensation, being taken as his first explicit disclosure, and it topped bestseller charts. It was not known at the volume's release that Hughes had terminal cancer and would die later that year. The book won the Forward Poetry Prize, the T. S. Eliot Prize for Poetry, and the Whitbread Poetry Prize. The poems, written after Plath's death, in some cases long after, try to find a reason why Plath killed herself.

In October 2015, the BBC Two documentary Ted Hughes: Stronger Than Death examined Hughes's life and work; it included audio recordings of Plath reciting her own poetry. Their daughter Frieda spoke for the first time about her mother and father.

== Themes and legacy ==
Love set you going like a fat gold watch.
The midwife slapped your footsoles, and your bald cry
Took its place among the elements.

— "Morning Song", Ariel, 1965

Sylvia Plath's early poems exhibit what became her typical imagery, using personal and nature-based depictions featuring, for example, the moon, blood, hospitals, fetuses, and skulls. They were mostly imitation exercises of poets she admired such as Dylan Thomas, W. B. Yeats and Marianne Moore. Late in 1959, when she and Hughes were at the Yaddo writers' colony in New York State, she wrote the seven-part "Poem for a Birthday", echoing Theodore Roethke's Lost Son sequence, though its theme is her own traumatic breakdown and suicide attempt at 21. After 1960 her work moved into a more surreal landscape darkened by a sense of imprisonment and looming death, overshadowed by her father. The Colossus is filled with themes of death, redemption and resurrection. After Hughes left, Plath produced, in less than two months, the 40 poems of rage, despair, love, and vengeance on which her reputation mostly rests.

Plath's landscape poetry, which she wrote throughout her life, has been described as "a rich and important area of her work that is often overlooked...some of the best of which was written about the Yorkshire moors". Her September 1961 poem "Wuthering Heights" takes its title from the novel by Emily Brontë, but its content and style is Plath's own particular vision of the Pennine landscape.

It was the posthumous publication of Ariel in 1965 that precipitated Plath's rise to fame and helped establish her reputation as one of the 20th century's best poets. As soon as it was published, critics began to see the collection as the charting of Plath's increasing desperation or death wish. Her dramatic death became her most famous aspect and remains so. Time and Life both reviewed the slim volume of Ariel in the wake of her death. The critic at Time said:

[W]ithin a week of her death, intellectual London was hunched over copies of a strange and terrible poem she had written during her last sick slide toward suicide. "Daddy" was its title; its subject was her morbid love-hatred of her father; its style was as brutal as a truncheon. What is more, "Daddy" was merely the first jet of flame from a literary dragon who in the last months of her life breathed a burning river of bale across the literary landscape.... In her most ferocious poems, "Daddy" and "Lady Lazarus", fear, hate, love, death and the poet's own identity become fused at black heat with the figure of her father, and through him, with the guilt of the German exterminators and the suffering of their Jewish victims. (Note: Plath has been criticized for her numerous and controversial allusions to the Holocaust.) They are poems, as Robert Lowell says in his preface to Ariel, that "play Russian roulette with six cartridges in the cylinder."

Some in the feminist movement saw Plath as speaking for their experience, as a "symbol of blighted female genius". Writer Honor Moore describes Ariel as marking the beginning of a movement, Plath suddenly visible as "a woman on paper", certain and audacious. Moore says: "When Sylvia Plath's Ariel was published in the United States in 1966, American women noticed. Not only women who ordinarily read poems, but housewives and mothers whose ambitions had awakened ... Here was a woman, superbly trained in her craft, whose final poems uncompromisingly charted female rage, ambivalence, and grief, in a voice with which many women identified."

Smith College, Plath's alma mater, holds her literary papers in the Smith College Library.

The United States Postal Service introduced a postage stamp featuring Plath in 2012. An English Heritage plaque records Plath's residence at 3 Chalcot Square, in London.

In 2013 a previously unseen draft of her poem "Sheep in Fog", written two weeks before her death, revealed her disturbed state of mind.

In 2018, The New York Times published an obituary for Plath as part of the Overlooked history project.

=== Portrayals in media ===
Plath's voice is heard in a BBC documentary about her life, recorded in London in late 1962. Of the BBC recording Elizabeth Hardwick wrote:

I have never before learned anything from a poetic reading, unless the clothes, the beard, the girls, the poor or good condition of the poet can be considered a kind of knowledge. But I was taken aback by Sylvia Plath's reading. It was not anything like I could have imagined. Not a trace of the modest, retreating, humorous Worcester, Massachusetts, of Elizabeth Bishop; nothing of the swallowed plain Pennsylvania of Marianne Moore. Instead these bitter poems—"Daddy", "Lady Lazarus", "The Applicant", "Fever 103°"—were beautifully read, projected in full-throated, plump, diction-perfect, Englishy, mesmerizing cadences, all round and rapid, and paced and spaced. Poor recessive Massachusetts had been erased. "I have done it again!" Clearly, perfectly, staring you down. She seemed to be standing at a banquet like Timon, crying, "Uncover, dogs, and lap!"

Letters Home is a 1986 experimental telefilm directed by Chantal Akerman in which Plath's letters to and from her mother are recited by Delphine Seyrig and Coralie Seyrig, with the latter taking on the role of Plath. It is an adaptation of Rose Leiman Goldemberg’s off-Broadway play.

Gwyneth Paltrow portrayed Plath in the biopic Sylvia (2003). Elizabeth Sigmund, who was friends with both Plath and Hughes, criticized the movie for depicting Sylvia as "a permanent depressive and a possessive person", but she conceded that "the film has an atmosphere towards the end of her life which is heartbreaking in its accuracy". Frieda Hughes, who was two years old when her mother died, objected to entertainment featuring her parents' troubled marriage and her mother's death. She accused the "peanut crunching" public of wanting to be titillated by her family's tragedies. In 2003, Frieda reacted to the situation in the poem "My Mother", first published in Tatler:

Now they want to make a film
For anyone lacking the ability
To imagine the body, head in oven,
Orphaning children

... they think
I should give them my mother's words
To fill the mouth of their monster,
Their Sylvia Suicide Doll

Plath appears as herself as a primary character in the 2009 fantasy novel Escape from Hell, written by Larry Niven and Jerry Pournelle, and the sequel to 1976's Inferno by the same authors. She accompanies protagonist Allen Carpenter as he attempts to guide various damned souls out of a version of Hell similar to Dante's Inferno.

=== Musical settings ===
- American composer Marjorie Rusche (b 1949) used Plath’s text in her song “Hanging Man.”
- In his Ariel: Five Poems of Sylvia Plath (1971), American composer Ned Rorem has set for soprano, clarinet and piano the poems "Words", "Poppies In July", "The Hanging Man", "Poppies In October", and "Lady Lazarus."
- Also drawing from Ariel, in his Six Poems by Sylvia Plath for solo soprano (1975), German composer Aribert Reimann has set the poems "Edge", "Sheep In Fog", "The Couriers", "The Night Dances", and "Words." He later set "Lady Lazarus" (1992), also for solo soprano.
- Finnish composer Kaija Saariaho's five-part From the Grammar of Dreams for soprano and mezzo a cappella (1988) is constructed on a collage of fragments from The Bell Jar and the poem "Paralytic." The piece was also arranged by the composer into a version for soprano and electronics (2002), in which the singer sings in interaction with a recorded double of her own voice. Albeit composed as a concert piece, From the Grammar of Dreams has also been staged.
- American composer Juliana Hall's Lorelei (1989) for mezzo, horn, and piano is a setting of Plath's poem of the same name. Hall had previously set "The Night Dances" as a movement of her cycle for soprano and piano Night Dances (1987) featuring texts by five female poets, and went on to write a song cycle for soprano and piano entirely devoted to Plath, Crossing The Water (2011), which comprises the poems "Street Song", "Crossing The Water", "Rhyme", and "Alicante Lullaby."
- In her cycle for soprano and piano The Blood Jet (2006), American composer Lori Laitman set the poems "Morning Song", "The Rival", "Kindness", and "Balloons."

== Publication list ==
=== Poetry collections ===
- The Colossus and Other Poems (1960, Heinemann)
- Ariel (1965, Faber & Faber)
- Three Women: A Monologue for Three Voices (1968, Turret Books)
- Crossing the Water (1971, Faber & Faber)
- Winter Trees (1971, Faber & Faber)
- The Collected Poems (1981, Faber & Faber)
- Selected Poems (1985, Faber & Faber)
- Ariel: The Restored Edition (2004, Faber & Faber)
- The Poems of Sylvia Plath, edited by Amanda Golden and Karen V. Kukil (2026, Faber & Faber)

=== Collected prose and novels ===
- The Bell Jar, under the pseudonym "Victoria Lucas" (novel, 1963, Heinemann)
- Letters Home: Correspondence 1950–1963 (1975, Harper & Row, US; Faber & Faber, UK)
- Johnny Panic and the Bible of Dreams: Short Stories, Prose, and Diary Excerpts (1977, Faber & Faber)
- The Journals of Sylvia Plath, edited by Ted Hughes and Frances McCullough (1982, The Dial Press)
- The Magic Mirror (1989), Plath's Smith College senior thesis
- The Unabridged Journals of Sylvia Plath, edited by Karen V. Kukil (2000, Anchor Books)
- The Letters of Sylvia Plath, Volume 1, edited by Peter K. Steinberg and Karen V. Kukil (2017, Faber & Faber)
- The Letters of Sylvia Plath, Volume 2, edited by Peter K. Steinberg and Karen V. Kukil (2018, Faber & Faber)
- Mary Ventura and the Ninth Kingdom (2019, Faber & Faber)
- The Collected Prose of Sylvia Plath, edited by Peter K. Steinberg (2024, Faber & Faber)

=== Children's books ===
- The Bed Book, illustrated by Quentin Blake (1976, Faber & Faber)
- The It-Doesn't-Matter Suit (1996, Faber & Faber)
- Mrs. Cherry's Kitchen (2001, Faber & Faber)
- Collected Children's Stories (UK, 2001, Faber & Faber)

== See also ==
- Sylvia Plath effect
