= Chalcot Square =

Garden square in London, England

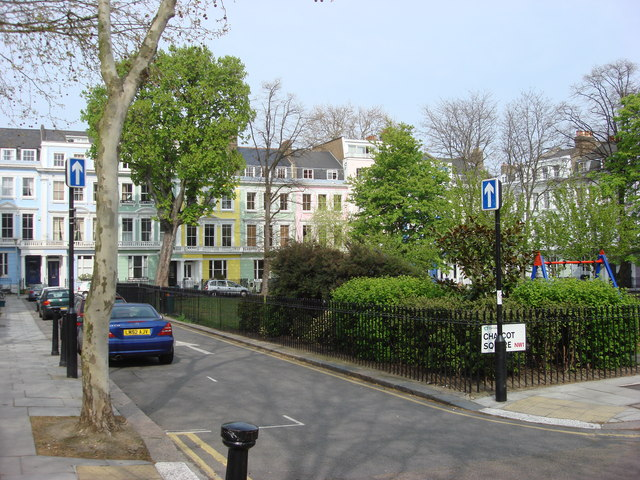
- Interactive map of Chalcot Square
- Type: Garden square
- Location: London, NW1; United Kingdom
- Coordinates: 51°32′28″N 0°9′18″W
- Area: 0.2 hectares (0.5 acres)
- Created: 1849
- Public transit: Chalk Farm

Chalcot Square is a garden square in the Primrose Hill district of London, England.

The square was laid out between 1849 and 1860 and was known as St George's Square until 1937. It is a residential square, well known for its brightly coloured Italianate terraced houses. Every house on the square is Grade II listed.

Sylvia Plath and Ted Hughes lived at 3 Chalcot Square for years and Plath is commemorated with a blue plaque. They rented their home to Assia Wevill and David Wevill. Other famous residents have included Ralph, Marion, Ed, and David Miliband; Robert Plant; Joan Bakewell; India Knight and Eric Joyce; Alan Bennett; and M. R. D. Foot.

== Gallery ==
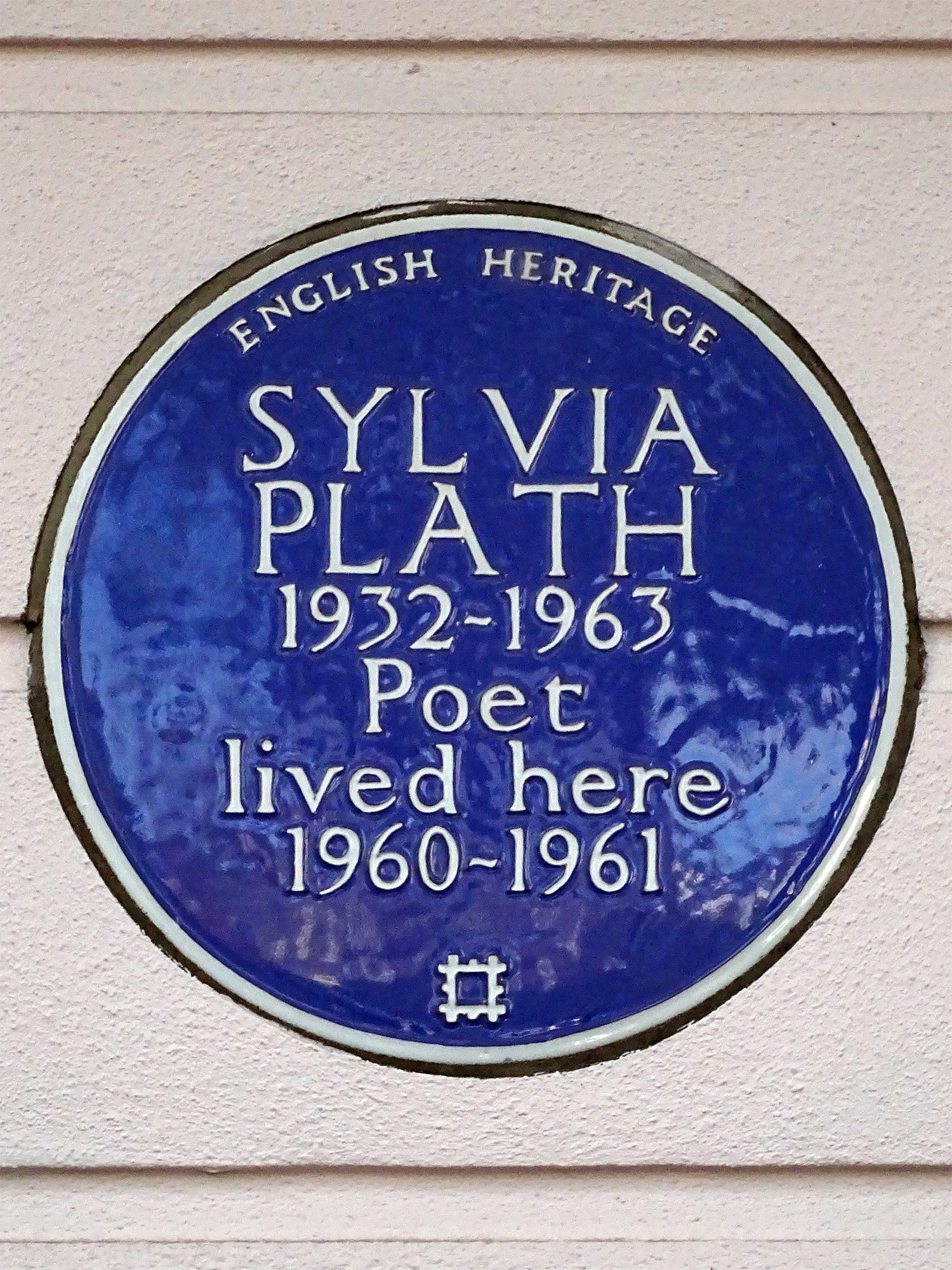
Blue plaque for Sylvia Plath
