= Nicholas Hughes =

English-American fisheries biologist (1962–2009)

- Born: January 17, 1962; North Tawton, Devon, England, United Kingdom
- Died: March 16, 2009 (aged 47); Fairbanks, Alaska, U.S.
- Citizenship: United Kingdom; United States
- Education: University of Oxford (B.A., M.A.); University of Alaska Fairbanks (Ph.D.)
- Known for: Stream salmonid ecology
- Parent(s): Ted Hughes; Sylvia Plath
- Scientific career
- Fields: Fisheries biology
- Workplaces: University of Alaska Fairbanks

Nicholas Farrar Hughes (January 17, 1962 – March 16, 2009) was a British and American fisheries biologist known as an expert in stream salmonid ecology. Hughes was the son of the American poet Sylvia Plath and English poet Ted Hughes, and the younger brother of artist and poet Frieda Hughes.

== Early life ==
Nicholas was born in North Tawton, Devon, England in 1962.

After her son was born, Plath wrote most of the poems that would comprise her most famous collection of poems (the posthumously published Ariel). Plath addressed one of her last poems, "Nick and the Candlestick", to her son:

In 1970, Ted Hughes remarried, and the children continued their life on the family farm in Devon.

Despite the posthumous fame of Sylvia Plath, and the growing literary and biographical writings about her death, Nicholas was not told about the circumstances of his mother's suicide until the 1970s. In 1998, Ted Hughes published Birthday Letters, over 30 years of poems about Plath, which he dedicated to his two children.

In the poem "Life After Death", Hughes recounts how:

Your son's eyes.... would become
So perfectly your eyes,
Became wet jewels
The hardest substance of the purest pain
As I fed him in his high white chair.

== Professional career ==
Hughes was passionate about wildlife, especially fish. He attended Oxford University, receiving a BA degree in zoology in 1984. From 1984 to 1991, he worked in Fairbanks, Alaska as a research assistant at the Alaska Cooperative Fish and Wildlife Research Unit, part of the Biological Resources Division of the United States Geological Survey, and from 1990 to 1991, he was a student intern with the Sportfish Division of the Alaska Department of Fish and Game. In 1991, he earned a Ph.D. in biology from University of Alaska Fairbanks (UAF).

After receiving his doctorate, Hughes held positions of increasing responsibility, instructing at UAF's School of Fisheries and Ocean Sciences in 1991–1992 and working as a research associate with UAF's Institute of Arctic Biology from 1992 to 1998. He held a post-doctoral fellowship from 1993 to 1995 with the Behavioral Ecology Research Group at Simon Fraser University in Burnaby, British Columbia and was a research associate there from 1995 to 1998. In September 1998, he became an assistant professor in the School of Fisheries and Ocean Science at UAF. Hughes studied stream salmonid ecology and conducted research both in the Alaska Interior and in New Zealand. He was a member of the American Fisheries Society.

During his scientific career, Hughes advanced the field of stream ecology as a prominent Alaskan biologist. According to Fairbanks reporter Dermot Cole:

The focus of Nick's professional life... dealt with what might appear to be a simple question, but was extraordinarily complex: "Why do fish prefer one position over another?" The logic of his research was that the combination of water flow and the streambed guide the way natural selection influences the behavior of individual salmon, grayling, trout and other species... A few times, I called him to let him know I would like to write about his life and his family connections, whenever a news story about his parents appeared, but he did not think it was a good idea, so it never happened. He deserved his privacy.... Here he was not a literary figure forever defined by the lives of his parents.

Hughes resigned from his faculty position at UAF in December 2006, but continued his scientific research of king salmon until his death.

== Death ==
On March 16, 2009, Hughes died by suicide in his home in Fairbanks, Alaska. According to his UAF colleagues, he had long battled depression.
