= David Wevill =

Japanese-born Canadian poet and translator

David Anthony Wevill (born 1935) is a Japanese-born Canadian poet and translator. He became a dual citizen (American and Canadian) in 1994. Wevill is a professor emeritus in the Department of English at The University of Texas at Austin.

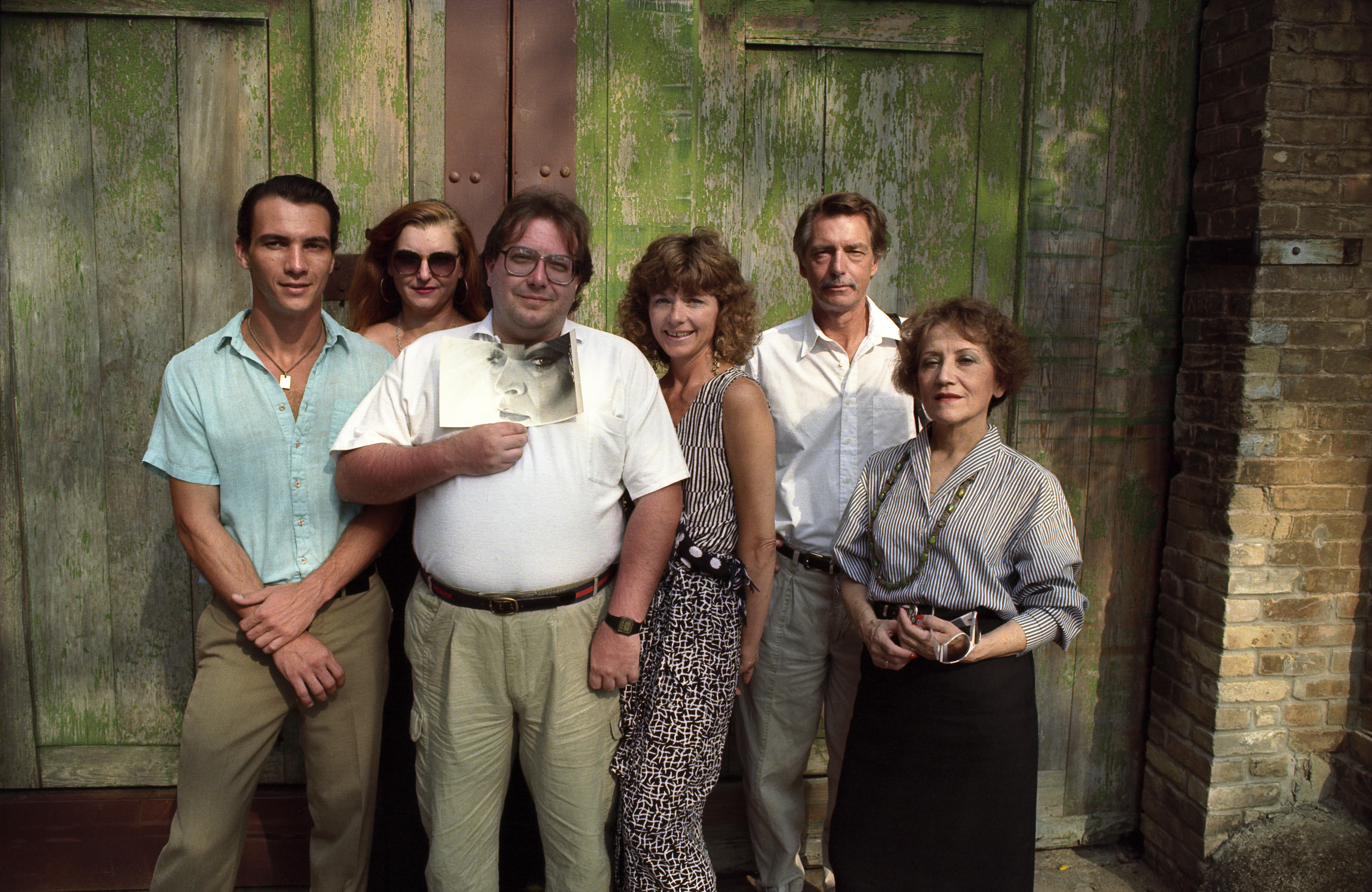
Photo by Mark Christal. Pictured poets from Austin Poets Audio Anthology Project, Vol. II, Naked Children include left to right: Michael Vecchio, Hedwig Gorski, Phillip T. Stephens, Isabella Russell-Ides, David Wevill, and Cecilia Bustamante. Stephens is holding a photo of Joy Cole, who had died, and was included on the tape.

Wevill was born in Japan and went to Canada before the outbreak of World War II. He read History and English at Gonville and Caius College, Cambridge, and became a noted member of an underground literary movement in London known as The Group.

Wevill first made a name for himself as a poet when he was included in Al Alvarez's anthology The New Poetry (Penguin, 1962), aimed at resisting the conservative milieu of mainstream British poetry. In 1963 Wevill was showcased in A Group Anthology (Oxford University Press). Wevill is also the former editor of Delos, a literary journal centered on poetry in translation and the poetics of translation.

He was awarded a Guggenheim Fellowship for Poetry in 1981.

Wevill was the third and final husband of Assia Wevill, from 1960 to her death in 1969.

== Works ==
- Penguin Modern Poets 4 (Penguin, 1963)
- Birth of a Shark (Macmillan, 1964)
- A Christ of the Ice-Floes (Macmillan, 1966)
- Penguin Modern European Poets: Ferenc Juhász (Penguin, 1970)
- Firebreak (Macmillan, 1971)
- Where the Arrow Falls (St. Martin's, 1974)
- Casual Ties (Curbstone, 1983; Tavern Books, 2010)
- Other Names for the Heart (Exile Editions Ltd., 1985)
- Figure of 8: New Poems and Selected Translations (Exile Editions Ltd., 1987)
- Figure of 8 (Shearsman, 1988)
- Child Eating Snow (Exile Editions Ltd., 1994)
- Solo With Grazing Deer (Exile Editions Ltd., 2001)
- Departures (Shearsman, 2003)
  - Departures - 2nd Edition (Shearsman, 2013)
- Asterisks (Exile Editions Ltd., 2007)
- To Build My Shadow a Fire: The Poetry and Translations of David Wevill edited by Michael McGriff (Truman State University Press, 2010)
