= Frieda Hughes =

English-Australian poet and painter (born 1960)

- Born: Frieda Rebecca Hughes; 1 April 1960 (age 66); London, England
- Education: Central Saint Martins College of Art and Design
- Known for: Painting, poetry
- Spouses: Desmond Dawe (m. 1979; div. 1982) Clive Anderson (divorced) Laszlo Lukacs (m. 1996; div. 2010)
- Parent(s): Ted Hughes; Sylvia Plath

Frieda Rebecca Hughes (born 1 April 1960) is an English-Australian poet and painter. She has published seven children's books, four poetry collections and one short story and has had many exhibitions. Hughes is the daughter of Pulitzer Prize winning American novelist and poet Sylvia Plath and Ted Hughes, who was Poet Laureate of the United Kingdom from 1984 until his death in 1998.

== Career ==
Hughes graduated from Central Saint Martins College of Art and Design, London, with a BA (Hons.) in 1988.

In June 2002, she received an Invention and Innovation award from the National Endowment for Science, Technology and the Arts for her project Forty Years.

From 2006 to 2008 she wrote a weekly poetry column for The Times newspaper and in 2008 was chair judge for the Forward Prizes for Poetry and a judge for the National Poetry Competition.

In February 2010, she was a guest on Private Passions, the biographical music discussion programme on BBC Radio 3.

In October 2015, Hughes spoke for the first time about her father as part of the BBC Two documentary Ted Hughes: Stronger Than Death.

In April 2023, Hughes appeared on the BBC Radio 4 programme Saturday Live speaking about her book George about her rescue of a magpie chick.

== Family and personal life ==
Frieda Hughes is the daughter of the poets Sylvia Plath and Ted Hughes. Her mother was an American novelist and poet, and her father was the British poet laureate from 1984 until his death in 1998. Hughes' mother died by suicide when she was almost three; her father died of a heart attack while being treated for cancer. Hughes' brother, Nicholas Hughes, died by suicide on 16 March 2009.

Hughes was born in London. She moved to Perth, Western Australia in 1988, and later settled in Wooroloo, a small hamlet north of Perth, in 1991, where the Australian landscape became the basis of much of her painting. She obtained dual Australian citizenship in 1992.

Hughes was married to farmworker Desmond Dawe from 1979 to 1982. Her second husband was an estate agent, Clive Anderson. Her third marriage, in 1996, was to Hungarian artist Laszlo Lukacs; they divorced in 2010 after a year-long separation. She has no children. Hughes rescues, keeps, and paints owls.

Hughes currently lives near Abermule, Powys, Wales.

== Exhibitions ==
- 1989: Group exhibition at the Chris Beetles Gallery, St James's, London.
- 1991: Group exhibition with the Milne and Moller Gallery at Art Expo 1991, London.
- 1992: Group exhibition with the Milne and Moller Gallery at Art Expo 1992, London.
- 1993: Solo exhibition at the Anna Mei Chadwick Gallery, Fulham, London; Joint exhibition at the Delaney Gallery, Perth, Western Australia; and Group exhibition at Perth Galleries, Perth, Western Australia.
- 1994: Group exhibition at the Gomboc Gallery, Middle Swan, Western Australia.
- 1995: Solo exhibition at the Provenance Gallery, Sydney, Australia; and Solo exhibition at the Anna Mei Chadwick Gallery, London.
- 1996: Joint exhibition with Laszlo Lukacs sponsored by Lloyds Bank, London.
- 1997: Joint exhibition with Laszlo Lukacs at the Cork St Gallery, London.
- 1998: Joint exhibition with Laszlo Lukacs sponsored by the Royal Commonwealth Society, London.
- 1999: Joint studio exhibition with Laszlo Lukacs, London.
- 2001: Joint studio exhibition with Laszlo Lukacs, London.
- 2002: Joint studio exhibition with Laszlo Lukacs, London.
- 2003: Joint exhibition with Laszlo Lukacs at the Soan Gallery, London.
- 2008: Joint exhibition with Laszlo Lukacs in Powys, Wales.
- 2015: Solo exhibition at the October Gallery, London.
- 2017: Solo exhibition at Chichester Cathedral. West Sussex.
- 2018: Solo exhibition at the Chris Beetles Gallery, London.

== Bibliography ==
Children's books

- 1986: Getting Rid of Edna – published in the UK by Heinemann. Published as Getting Rid of Aunt Edna in the US by Harper and Row. Published in paperback in the UK by Pan Books in 1988.
- 1989: The Meal a Mile Long – author-illustrated picture book for young children. Published by Simon and Schuster in the US, Australia and the UK.
- 1990: Waldorf and the Sleeping Granny – published by Simon and Schuster in the UK.
- 1992: The Thing in the Sink – published by Simon and Schuster in the UK. Reissued in 2003 by Hodder Children's Books.
- 1994: Rent-a-friend – published by Simon and Schuster in the UK.
- 1997: The Tall Story – published by Macdonald Young Books in the UK. Re-issued by Hodder Children's Books in 2003.
- 2001: Three Scary Stories – published by HarperCollins in the UK.

Poetry collections

- 1998: Wooroloo – published in the US by Harper Flamingo. Published in 1999 in Australia by Fremantle Arts Centre Press and in the UK by Bloodaxe Books. Wooroloo received a Poetry Book Society Special Commendation.
- 2001: Stonepicker – published by Bloodaxe Books in the UK and Fremantle Press in Australia.
- 2002: Waxworks – published by Bloodaxe Books in the UK, HarperCollins in the US and Fremantle Press in Australia in 2003.
- 2006: Forty-Five – published by HarperCollins in the U.S.
- 2006: The Book of Mirrors – published by Bloodaxe Books in the UK.
- 2009: Stonepicker and The Book of Mirrors – published by HarperCollins in the U.S.
- 2015: Alternative Values: poems & paintings – published by Bloodaxe Books in the UK.
- 2018: Out of the Ashes – published by Bloodaxe Books in the UK.

Hughes's poems have also been published in The New Yorker, Tatler, The Spectator, Thumbscrew, The Paris Review, First Pressings, The London Magazine, The Times, The Guardian, and The Daily Telegraph among others.

Memoirs

- 2023: George: A Magpie Memoir – with illustrations by Frieda Hughes, published by Profile Books in the UK.
