= Venus and Adonis (Shakespeare poem) =

1593 poem by William Shakespeare

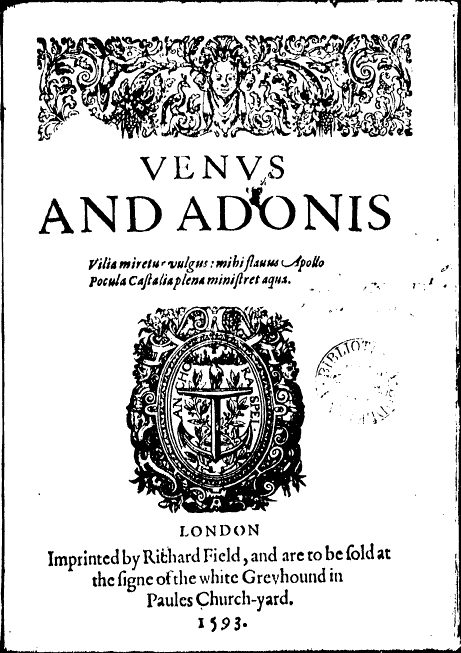
Title page of the first quarto (1593)

Venus and Adonis is a narrative poem by William Shakespeare published in 1593. It is considered likely to be Shakespeare's first publication.

The poem tells the story of Venus, the goddess of Love; of her unrequited love; and of her attempted seduction of Adonis, an extremely handsome young man, who would rather go hunting. The poem is pastoral, and at times erotic, comic and tragic. It contains discourses on the nature of love, and observations of nature.

It is written in stanzas of six lines of iambic pentameter rhyming ABABCC; although this verse form was known before Shakespeare's use, it is now commonly known as the Venus and Adonis stanza, after this poem. This form was also used by Edmund Spenser and Thomas Lodge. The poem consists of 199 stanzas or 1,194 lines.

It was published originally as a quarto pamphlet and published with great care. It was probably printed using Shakespeare's fair copy. The printer was Richard Field, who, like Shakespeare, was from Stratford. Venus and Adonis appeared in print before any of Shakespeare's plays were published, but not before some of his plays had been acted on stage. It has certain qualities in common with A Midsummer Night's Dream, Romeo and Juliet, and Love's Labour's Lost. It was written when the London theatres were closed for a time due to the plague.

The poem begins with a brief dedication to Henry Wriothesley, 3rd Earl of Southampton, in which the poet describes the poem as "the first heir of my invention".

The poem is inspired by and based on stories found in the Metamorphoses, a narrative poem by the Latin poet, Ovid (43 BC – AD 17/18). Ovid's much briefer version of the tale occurs in book ten of his Metamorphoses. It differs greatly from Shakespeare's version. Ovid's Venus goes hunting with Adonis to please him, but otherwise is uninterested in the out-of-doors. She wears "tucked up" robes, worries about her complexion, and particularly hates dangerous wild animals. Shakespeare's Venus is a bit like a wild animal herself: she apparently goes naked, and is not interested in hunting, but only in having sex with Adonis, offering her body to him in graphically explicit terms. In the end, she insists that the boar's killing of Adonis happened accidentally as the animal, impressed by the young hunter's beauty, gored him while trying to kiss him. Venus's behavior seems to reflect Shakespeare's own feelings of empathy about animals: his poem devotes many stanzas to descriptions of a stallion's feelings as he pursues a sexually attractive mare and to a hare's feelings as hounds run it down. Other stories in Ovid's work are, to a lesser degree, considered sources: the tales of Salmacis and Hermaphroditus, Narcissus, and Pygmalion.

It was published about five years before Christopher Marlowe's posthumously published Hero and Leander, which is also a narrative love poem based on a story from Ovid.

Venus and Adonis was extremely popular as soon as it was published, and it was reprinted fifteen times before 1640. It is unusual that so few of the original quartos have survived.

== Synopsis ==
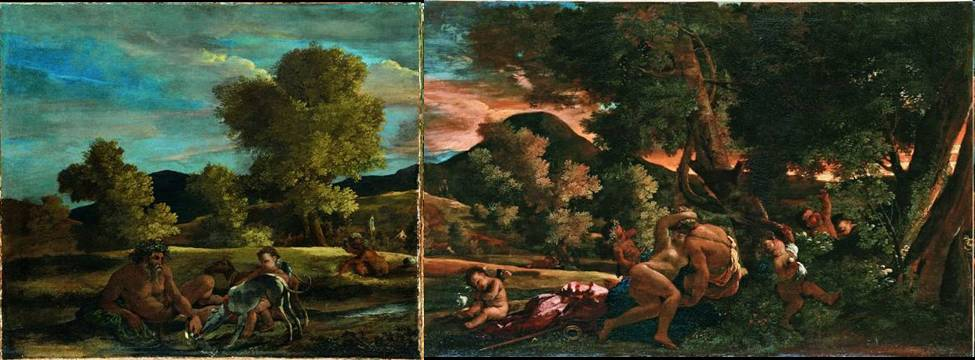
Venus Seducing Adonis as depicted by Nicolas Poussin, c. 1626, a re-united painting. Musée Fabre, Montpellier, France.

Adonis is a young man renowned for his incredible beauty. However, he is not interested at all in love; he only wants to go hunting. Venus is the goddess of love. When she sees Adonis, she falls in love with him, and comes down to earth, where she encounters him setting out on a hunt. She desires him to get off his horse, and speak to her. Adonis doesn't want to talk to any woman, not even a goddess. So she forces him, and then lies down beside him, gazes at him, and talks of love. She craves a kiss; he wants to leave and go hunting. He manages to get away, and he goes to get his horse.

At that moment, his horse becomes enamoured of another horse, who at first resists, but soon the two animals gallop off together, which keeps Adonis from going hunting. Venus approaches him, and continues to speak to him of love. He listens for a bit, then turns away scornfully. This pains her, and she faints. Afraid he might have killed her, Adonis kneels beside her, strokes and kisses her. Venus recovers and requests one last kiss. He reluctantly gives in.

Venus wants to see him again; Adonis tells her that he cannot see her tomorrow, because he is going to hunt the wild boar. Venus has a vision, and warns him that if he does so, he will be killed by a boar. She then flings herself on him, tackling him to the ground. He pries himself loose, and lectures her on the topic of lust versus love. He then leaves; she cries.

The next morning Venus roams the woods searching for Adonis. She hears dogs and hunters in the distance. Thinking of her vision that he will be killed by the boar, she is afraid, and hurries to catch up with the hunt. She comes across hunting dogs that are injured. Then she finds Adonis, killed by a wild boar. Venus is devastated. Because this loss occurred to the goddess of love, she decrees that love will henceforth be mixed with suspicion, fear, and sadness and that love will be "fickle, false and full of fraud". Adonis's body has grown cold and pale. His blood gives colour to the plants all around him. A flower grows from the soil beneath him. It is white and purple, like blood on Adonis's flesh. Venus, bereft, leaves to confine herself to Paphos, on Cyprus, where she was worshipped.

== Adaptations ==
- In 1992, the then British poet laureate, Ted Hughes, published a book, Shakespeare and the Goddess of Complete Being (Faber and Faber in UK, Farrar Straus in US), based on a "shamanic" interpretation of Venus and Adonis as a "key" to Shakespeare's tragic dramas.
- In 1996 The Theatreworks Company, Dublin, staged an acclaimed adaptation by Artistic Director Michael Caven (now Barker-Caven).
- In 2004, the Royal Shakespeare Company staged Venus and Adonis with marionettes (Gregory Doran, director).
- During the 2010–2011 season, the Boston Metro Opera staged Venus and Adonis, a chamber opera in one act (duration approximately 40 minutes). The libretto is Shakspeare's poem (edited by Gretchen Snedeker (1983–2008), American French horn player and adjunct professor of music at Colgate University in Hamilton, New York). The music is by American composer Zachary Wadsworth (born 1983).
- The original poem is read by several British actors (among them David Burke, Eve Best, and Benjamin Soames) on a Naxos audiobook. The audiobook also includes The Rape of Lucrece.
- Richard Burton recorded a spoken word album of the poem for Caedmon Records.
- The title of the theme song for the Haunted Mansion attractions at Disneyland, Walt Disney World, and Tokyo Disneyland, Grim Grinning Ghosts, is taken from a line in Venus and Adonis:

"Hard-favour'd tyrant, ugly, meagre, lean,
Hateful divorce of love," thus chides she Death,
Grim-grinning ghost, earth's worm, what dost thou mean
To stifle beauty and to steal his breath,
Who when he liv'd, his breath and beauty set
Gloss on the rose, smell to the violet?

- A live cyberpunk/techno performance, starring Megan Henning and Travis Schuldt and directed by James Kerwin, played for several weeks in Hollywood, California in 2001.
- Another theatrical adaptation, William Shakespeare's Venus & Adonis, with an original score and songs by Christopher Reiner, was performed by Zombie Joe's Underground Theatre Group in North Hollywood, California, in 2006.
- In 2020, Rodrigo Ruiz created Venus & Adonis, a song cycle inspired by the poem and set entirely to Shakespeare's text. This work was recorded for Signum Records and released in the eponymous album on 27 September 2024.

== See also ==
- 1593 in poetry
- Ovid's Metamorphoses
- Shakespeare's Sonnets
