= Chris Mould =

British illustrator (born 1969)

- Born: 1969 (age 56–57); Bradford, England, UK
- Education: Leeds Beckett University
- Occupations: Illustrator, author
- Children: 2
- Writing career
- Genre: Children's
- Notable works: A Boy Called Christmas; The Iron Man; Animal Farm
- Notable awards: Nottingham Children's Book Award; Swiss Prix Enfantasie Best Children's Novel Award

Chris Mould (born 1969) is a British illustrator and occasional writer of children's books. He exhibits his artwork regularly, and commits to an ongoing programme of events. He currently has over 20 books in print between the US and the UK. His notable works include A Boy Called Christmas, A Girl Who Saved Christmas, Father Christmas and Me, The Truth Pixie, The Iron Man, and Animal Farm.

== Personal life ==
Mould was born in 1969 in Bradford, West Yorkshire.

When he left school at the age of 16, the only skill he had was drawing. He decided to go to an art school to study graphic design and then received a honours degree in Graphic Design & Illustration at Leeds Polytechnic.

== Career ==
After graduation, Mould worked as a freelance illustrator from a studio in Oakenshaw for three years. He has collaborated with many publishers such as Oxford University Press, Bloomsbury, Canongate, HarperCollins, Macmillan, Penguin Random House.

In December 2019, he became the patron of the Rotherham literacy centre. He joined other famous names such as Paul Clayton, Abi Elphinstone, Joanne Harris, Ian McMillan, Sir Paul Collier, Jeremy Dyson and Mark Gatiss in championing Grimm & Co as supporters and patrons.

In an interview in 2021, he named Ralph Steadman, Ronald Searle, George Cruikshank, Adam Stower, Alex T Smith, and Peter Goes as his artistic influences.

As of 2021, he lives in Yorkshire with his wife and daughters.

He currently works in a studio at Dean Clough, Halifax, West Yorkshire.

== Works ==
=== As author and illustrator ===
- Dust 'n' Bones: Ten Ghost Stories (2006)
- 76 Pumpkin Lane: Spooky House: Pop-Up Book (2007)
- 76 Pumpkin Lane: Tombstone Rally (2008)
- Something Wickedly Weird Series:
  - The Werewolf and the Ibis (2010)
  - The Ice Pirates (2010)
  - The Buccaneer's Bones (2010)
  - The Curse of the Wolf (2010)
  - The Smugglers' Secret (2010)
  - The Golden Labyrinth (2010)
- Fangs 'n' Fire: Ten Dragon Tales (2010)
- Pop-up Ghost Train (2010)
- Spindlewood Series:
  - Pip and the Wood Witch Curse (2011)
  - Pip and the Twilight Seekers (2011)
  - Pip and the Lost Children (2011)
- Pirates 'n' Pistols (2012)
- Pocket Pirates Series:
  - The Great Cheese Robbery (2015)
  - The Great Drain Escape (2018)
  - The Great Flytrap Disaster (2019)
  - The Great Treasure Hunt (2019)

=== As illustrator ===
written by other authors

- Hank the Clank (1995), by Michael Coleman
- Hank Clanks Again (1995), by Michael Coleman
- History's Great Inventors (1996), by Philip Ardagh
- History's Big Mistakes (1996), by Adam Bowett
- Treasure Island (1998), by Robert Louis Stevenson
- A-Haunting We Will Go & other spooky rhymes (1999), by Nicholas Tulloch
- Make 'Em Laugh (1999), by Clare Belan
- Doctor Jekyll and Mr.Hyde (2000), by Robert Louis Stevenson
- Unidentified Frying Omelette (2000), by Andrew Fusek Peters
- Twelfth Night (The Shakespeare Collection) (2000), by Jan Dean
- The Day Our Teacher Went Batty (2002), by Gervase Phinn
- Meet the Weirds (2003), by Kaye Umansky
- Gilbert (2003), by Colin Thompson
- Pirates (2003), by Chris Powling
- Fillet and the Mob (2004), by Susan Ashe
- The Sandwich That Jack Made (2004), by Elspeth Graham
- Hercules: Superhero (2005), by Diane Redmond
- One Man Went to Mow (2007), by Rose Impey
- Young Wizards (2008), by Michael Lawrence
- The Shadow of Evil (2009), by Tim Pigott-Smith
- The Night I was Chased by a Vampire (2012), by Kaye Umansky
- Alistair Grim's Odditorium (2015), by Gregory Funaro
- The Beast (2016), by Michaela Morgan
- The Great Cheese Robbery (2016), by Tim Warnes
- Aunt Nasty (2016), by Margaret Mahy
- Duperball (2016), by Kes Gray
- The Sand Witch (2016), by Alan MacDonald
- Ronald the Tough Sheep (2016), by Martin Waddell
- The Prince and the Pee (2017), by Greg Gormley
- Young Dracula (2018), by Michael Lawrence
- Embassy of the Dead (2018), by Will Mabbitt
- Amazing Transport (2019), by Tom Jackson
- The Cosmic Atlas of Alfie Fleet (2019), by Martin Howard
- The Iron Man (2019), by Ted Hughes
- Wolfman (2019), by Michael Rosen
- The Greatest Spy Who Never Was (2019), by David Codd
- Alfie Fleet's Guide to the Universe (2020), by Martin Howard
- The Vanishing Trick (2020), by Jenni Spangler
- Animal Farm (2021), by George Orwell
- The Incredible Talking Machine (2021), by Jenni Spangler
- Isabelle and the Crooks (2022), by Michelle Robinson
- Billy Brute Whose Teacher Was a Werewolf (2022), by Issy Emeney
- Planet Football (2022), by Michelle Robinson
- Vile Virginia and the Curse that Got Worse (2024), by Issy Emeney
- Pernickety Boo (2024), by Sally Gardner
- War of the Worlds (2024), by H. G. Wells

written by Barry Hutchison

- Benjamin Blank Series:
  - The Shark-Headed Bear Thing (2015)
  - The Swivel-Eyed Ogre-Thing (2015)
  - The Moon-Faced Ghoul-Thing (2015)

written by Ian Ogilvy

- Measle Series:
  - Measle and the Wrathmonk (2005)
  - Measle and the Mallockee (2005)
  - Measle and the Dragodon (2006)
  - Measle and the Slitherghoul (2007)
  - Measle and the Doompit (2008)
- Measle Stubbs Adventure:
  - The Funfair of Fear! (2010)
  - The Pits of Peril! (2011)

written by Matt Haig

- A Boy Called Christmas (2015)
- The Girl Who Saved Christmas (2016)
- Father Christmas and Me (2017)
- The Truth Pixie (2018)
- The Truth Pixie Goes To School (2019)
- A Mouse Called Miika (2021)

written by Steve Webb

- Spangles McNasty Series:
  - Spangles McNasty and the Fish of Gold (2016)
  - Spangles McNasty and the Tunnel of Doom (2017)
  - Spangles McNasty and the Diamond Skull (2018)

written by Tim Healey

- Mortimer Keene Series:
  - Attack of the Slime (2013)
  - Alien Abduction (2014)
  - Dino Danger (2015)
  - Robot Riot (2015)
- Ghosts on the Loose (2014)

== Awards and recognitions ==
Awards

- 2003 Nottingham Children's Book Award for Vesuvius Poovius by Kes Gray.
- 2012 Swiss Prix Enfantasie Best Children's Novel Award.

Shortlisted

- 2013 Kate Greenaway Medal for Pirates 'n' Pistols.
- 2016 British Book Industry Awards for A Boy Called Christmas by Matt Haig.
- 2016 Sheffield Children's Book Award for A Boy Called Christmas by Matt Haig.
- 2017 Sheffield Children's Book Award for Pocket Pirates - The Great Drain Escape.
- 2020 Kate Greenaway Medal for The Iron Man by Ted Hughes.
