= Court Green =

House in North Tawton, Devon, England

Coordinates: 50.8001°N 3.8951°W

Court Green is a house in North Tawton, Devon, England. It was the home the poets Ted Hughes and Sylvia Plath moved to in late August 1961.

Plath left the house on 10 December 1962, while Hughes lived there on and off for the rest of his life. It is the current home of his widow Carol Hughes.

The house is listed Grade II on the National Heritage List for England.

== Sylvia Plath ==
Sylvia Plath wrote most of the Ariel (1965) poems at Court Green. She composed "The Moon and the Yew Tree" about the ancient yew in the nearby churchyard, which could be seen from her bedroom window; the tree can still be seen today. The poem "The Bee Meeting" concerns an event which Plath observed just outside the wool factory on the River Taw near the house. Percy Keys, a neighbour of the Hughes during their time at Court Green, is mentioned in The Journals of Sylvia Plath, and his funeral is remembered in Plath's poem "Berck-Plage". Keys is buried in the graveyard on the hill above the house.

== Ted Hughes ==
Ted Hughes wrote Crow (1970) and most of his later work at the house. He wrote standing at a lectern. Hughes died in 1998, and his friend Seamus Heaney read at the funeral service at the church across the lawn.
