= Neil Roberts (author) =

Emeritus Professor of English literature (born 1946)

Neil Roberts (born 1946, Manchester) is an emeritus Professor of English literature at the University of Sheffield. He is the author of critical studies of Ted Hughes, D. H. Lawrence, George Eliot and George Meredith, including the first critical study of Peter Redgrove.

Roberts's book A Lucid Dreamer was shortlisted for the 2013 East Midlands Book Award.

== Life ==
Neil Roberts was born in Manchester in 1946 and educated in Latymer Upper School, London, and Clare College, Cambridge.

== Selected publications ==
- Roberts, Neil (2003). A Companion to 20th-Century Poetry. Wiley-Blackwell. ISBN 9781405113618.
- Roberts, Neil (2004). D.H. Lawrence, Travel and Cultural Difference. Palgrave Macmillan. ISBN 9781349507399.
- Roberts, Neil (2006). Ted Hughes: A Literary Life. Palgrave Macmillan. ISBN 9781403936059.
- Roberts, Neil (2012). A Lucid Dreamer: The Life of Peter Redgrove. Jonathan Cape. ISBN 9780224090292.
- Roberts, Neil (2016). Sons and Lovers: The Biography of a Novel. Liverpool University Press. ISBN 9781942954279.
