= Wolfwatching =

1989 poetry book by Ted Hughes

First edition

Wolfwatching is a book of poems by former English Poet Laureate Ted Hughes, his fourteenth. It was first published in London by Faber and Faber in 1989.

Its dedication reads "For Hilda", and it contains twenty-one poems:

- "A Sparrow Hawk"
- "Two Astrological Conundrums"
1. The Fool's Evil Dream
2. Tell
- "Slump Sundays"
- "Climbing into Heptonstall"
- "A Macaw"
- "Dust As We Are"
- "Wolfwatching"
- "Telegraph Wires"
- "Source"
- "Sacrifice"
- "For the Duration"
- "Anthem for Doomed Youth"
- "The Black Rhino"
- "Leaf Mould"
- "Manchester Skytrain"
- "Walt"
1. Under High Wood
2. The Atlantic
- "Take What You Want But Pay For It"
- "Us He Devours"
- "Little Whale Song"
- "On the Reservations"
1. Sitting Bull on Christmas Morning
2. Nightvoice
3. The Ghost Dancer
- "A Dove"

== See also ==
- 1989 in poetry
