= Crow (poetry) =

Book by Ted Hughes

First edition cover (Faber & Faber, 1970)

Crow: From the Life and Songs of the Crow is a literary work by poet Ted Hughes, first published in 1970 by Faber & Faber, and one of Hughes' most important works. Writing for the Ted Hughes Society Journal in 2012, Neil Roberts, Emeritus Professor of English Literature at the University of Sheffield, said:

Crow holds a uniquely important place in Hughes oeuvre. It heralds the ambitious second phase of his work, lasting roughly from the late sixties to the late seventies, when he turned from direct engagement with the natural world to unified mythical narratives and sequences. It was his most controversial work: a stylistic experiment which abandoned many of the attractive features of his earlier work, and an ideological challenge to both Christianity and humanism. Hughes wrote Crow, mostly between 1966 and 1969, after a barren period following the death of Sylvia Plath. He looked back on the years of work on Crow as a time of imaginative freedom and creative energy, which he felt that he never subsequently recovered. He described Crow as his masterpiece...

Recurring themes draw extensively from world mythologies and collective archetypes, including both trickster and Christian mythology. A central core group of poems in Crow can be seen as an attack on Christianity. The first Crow poems were inspired by several pen and ink drawings by the American artist Leonard Baskin.

It is quoted briefly in the liner notes for "My Little Town" by Paul Simon, and in the epigraph of Catspaw by Joan D. Vinge.
