= The Hawk in the Rain =

1957 poem collection by Ted Hughes

First edition (Faber and Faber, 1957)

The Hawk in the Rain is a collection of 40 poems by the British poet Ted Hughes. Published by Faber and Faber in 1957, it was Hughes's first book of poetry. The book received immediate acclaim in both England and America, where it won the Galbraith Prize. Many of the book's poems imagine the real and symbolic lives of animals, including a fox, a jaguar, and the eponymous hawk. Other poems focus on erotic relationships, and on stories of the First World War, Hughes's father being a survivor of Gallipoli.

The book, dedicated to Hughes' first wife Sylvia Plath, is a collection of 40 poems. According to the Oxford Dictionary of National Biography, Plath considered her husband's poetry "the most rich and powerful since that of Yeats and Dylan Thomas". In 1957 Plath submitted the collection to a competition organised by the Poetry Centre of the Young Men's and Young Women's Hebrew Association of New York. The judges, W. H. Auden, Stephen Spender and Marianne Moore, awarded it the first prize. Marianne Moore wrote: "Hughes's talent is unmistakable, the work has focus, is aglow with feeling, with conscience; sensibility is awake, embodied in appropriate diction."

Writing in the Oxford Dictionary of National Biography, Keith Sagar said, "Hughes rejected the Latinate iamb in favour of bludgeoning trochees and spondees. The strong alliteration, onomatopoeia, and hyperbole gave his poems an impact not heard in English verse since the demise of Middle English."

== Contents ==
1. The Hawk in the Rain
2. The Jaguar
3. Macaw and Little Miss
4. The Thought-Fox
5. The Horses
6. Famous Poet
7. Song
8. Parlour-Piece
9. Secretary
10. Soliloquy of a Misanthrope
11. The Dove-Breeder
12. Billet-Doux
13. A Modest Proposal
14. Incompatibilities
15. September
16. Fallgrief's Girl-Friends
17. Two Phases
18. The Decay of Vanity
19. Fair Choice
20. The Conversion of the Reverend Skinner
21. Complaint
22. Phaetons
23. Egg-Head
24. The Man Seeking Experience Enquire His Way of a Drop of Water
25. Meeting
26. Wind
27. October Dawn
28. Roarers in a Ring
29. Vampire
30. Childbirth
31. The Hag
32. Law in the Country of the Cats
33. Invitation to the Dance
34. The Casualty
35. Bayonet Charge
36. Griefs for Dead Soldiers
37. Six Young Men
38. Two Wise Generals
39. The Ancient Heroes and the Bomber Pilot
40. The Martyrdom of Bishop Farrar
