= Chudleigh Town Hall =

Municipal building in Chudleigh, Devon, England

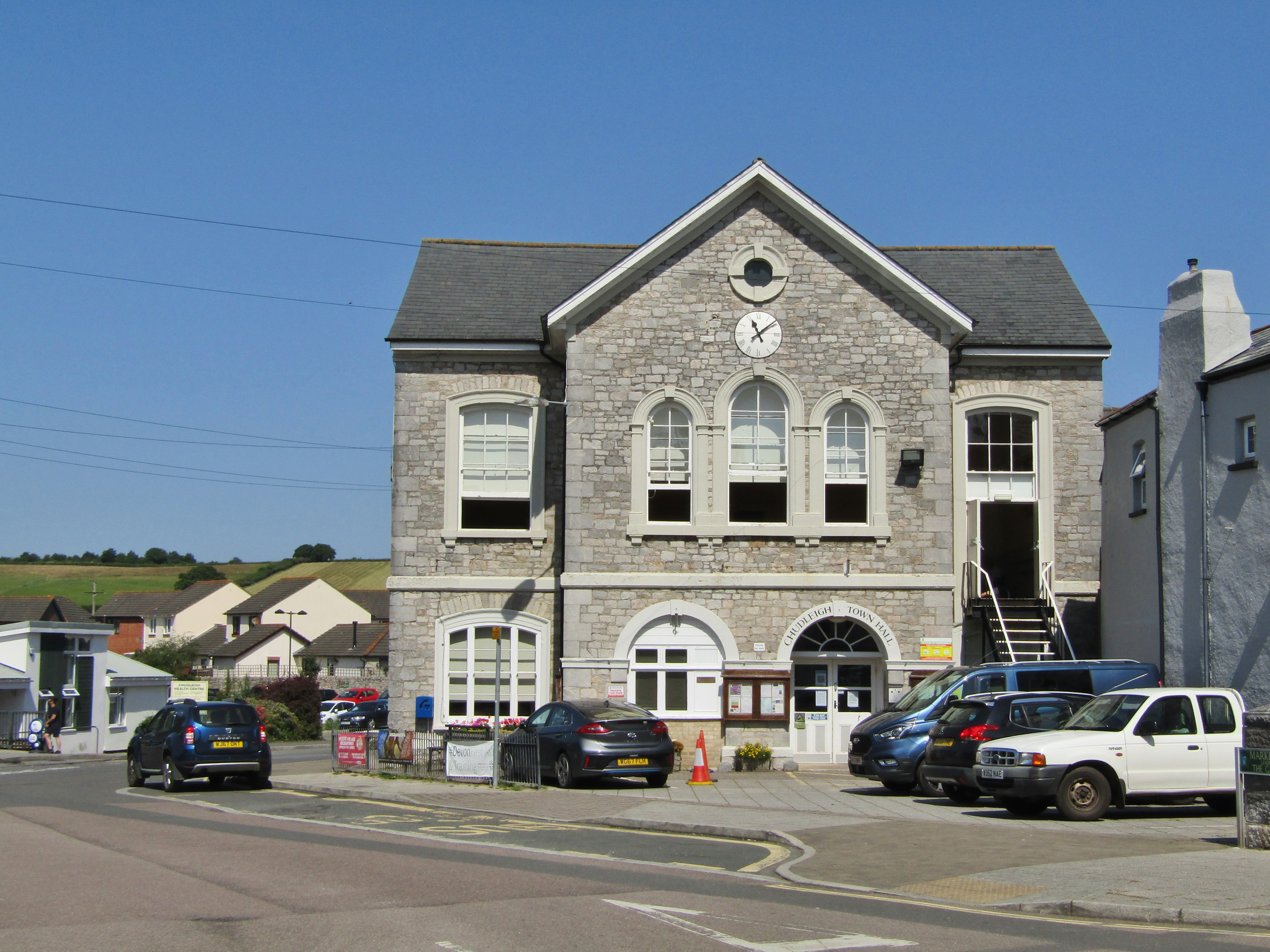
- Chudleigh Town Hall

- Shown in Devon
- 50.6054°N 3.6008°W
- Location: Market Way, Chudleigh

History
- Built: 1865

Site notes
- Architectural style: Italianate style

Listed Building – Grade II
- Official name: The Town Hall
- Designated: 28 April 1987
- Reference no.: 1334259

Chudleigh Town Hall is a municipal building in Market Way, Chudleigh, Devon, England. The town hall, which is the meeting place of Chudleigh Town Council, is a Grade II listed building.

== History ==
The first municipal building in the town was an old market house which was badly damaged in the great fire which destroyed much of the town on 22 May 1807. Shortly afterwards, a new market house was erected on the site of the King's Arms in what is now Market Way; it was a rectangular building, open on the ground floor, with storage capacity on the first floor and a turret on the roof.

In the late 1850s, having established that the market house in Market Way was structurally unstable, the civic leaders decided to replace it with a new structure on the same site. The new building was designed in the Italianate style, built in rubble masonry at a cost of £600 and was completed in 1865. The design involved a symmetrical main frontage with three bays facing southeast towards New Exeter Street; the central bay, which projected forward, featured two round headed openings with architraves and keystones on the ground floor, three round headed sash windows set close together in the style of a Venetian window on the first floor and a gable above containing an oculus. The outer bays were fenestrated by segmental sash windows on both floors. Internally, the principal room was the assembly hall on the first floor which was used as an events venue for balls, concerts and lectures.

In the 1880s, the internal layout of the first floor of the building was re-configured to create a chapel for religious services. In the 19th century, petty session hearings alternated between Chudleigh Town Hall and North Tawton Town Hall.

During the First World War, a Voluntary Aid Detachment hospital was established at Alpha House in Fore Street and fund-raining events were held at the town hall to support the hospital: significant contributors included Lewis Clifford, 9th Baron Clifford of Ugbrooke House and Sir Edward Chaning Wills of Harcombe House.

For much of the 20th century the parish of Chudleigh was administered by Newton Abbot Rural District Council, but, following the implementation of local government re-organisation in 1974, Chudleigh elected its own town council with offices in the town hall. In February 2009, the former chapel and the meeting room on the first floor were used as dormitories for motorists who had become stranded in a snow storm while travelling on the A38 road. The town hall had been designated as an Emergency Rest Centre. A new roll of honour, intended to commemorate the lives of local service personnel who had died in the First World War and which consolidated the names previously listed in churches around the parish, was unveiled in the town hall in August 2014.
