= The Iron Woman =

1993 novel by Ted Hughes

- First edition Faber & Faber
- Author: Ted Hughes
- Illustrator: George Adamson (first); Andrew Davidson (1993)
- Genre: Science fiction
- Publication place: United Kingdom
- Media type: Print
- Pages: 59 pp.
- Preceded by: The Iron Man

The Iron Woman is a science fiction novel by British writer Ted Hughes, published in 1993. It is a sequel to the 1968 novel The Iron Man.

== Story ==
The main character, Lucy, finds the Iron Woman in a state of rage and despair, covered in filthy chemicals. After being cleaned by Lucy, the Iron Woman takes her to see the environment in which she lives. Lucy sympathises with the Iron Woman, watching the animals' painful deaths as more toxic material is poured into the marsh from the local waste-disposal factory. She is angry and wants to save them all, but her dad is one of the factory workers. Lucy contacts Hogarth, the friend of the Iron Man, asking for his help. With the aid of the Iron Man's servant the Space-Bat-Angel-Dragon, the Iron Woman is temporarily granted the power to change all men - first those in the factory, then others across the country - into swamp creatures, so that they can feel what the animals of the marsh were enduring. They all burp black bubbles of cloud, which the next day form a massive spider-like cloud which claims to be a god of wealth and gain. The Iron Woman forces it to admit that it is just a mess that needs cleaning up, and the Space-Bat-Angel-Dragon takes the Cloud-Spider up into space. All the transformed men are returned to normal, thought their hair is now white, as though it has been bleached or they have aged. All the country's remaining rubbish and pollutants also start transforming into strange yellow webs, which can be used as fuel and other things without harming the environment. Later, when Hogarth and Lucy ask where the bubbles that formed the Cloud-Spider came from, the Iron Woman simply replies "Big, deep fright. Big, deep change."

== Reception ==
The book had a mostly positive reception from critics.
