= Rain-charm for the Duchy =

1992 poetry anthology by Ted Hughes

- First edition
- Author: Ted Hughes
- Genre: Poetry
- Publisher: Faber Paperbacks
- Publication date: 1992
- Publication place: United Kingdom
- Pages: 64
- ISBN: 978-0571166053

Rain-charm for the Duchy is a book of poems by Ted Hughes. The book contains poems written by Hughes during his tenure as Poet Laureate of the United Kingdom, from 1984. The poems in the book celebrate royal occasions. The book was first published by Faber and Faber in 1992.

== Reception ==
In Literary Review, in March 1995, Robert Nye reviewed what he jokingly called the "New Selected Spells by the Royal Witch Doctor". One of these 'spells' was "Rain-Charm for the Duchy", Hughes's 1984 hymn of praise to the rivers of the West Country, in celebration of Prince Harry’s christening. Nye wrote, "John Betjeman's old suit hardly fits a dour Yorkshireman with ambitions to be a sort of royal witch doctor. Only one of those Laureate effusions is included here, the one for HRH Prince Harry, which has some decent lines about salmon responding to a storm."

In 2021 Yvonne Reddick, Research Fellow at the University of Central Lancashire, reviewing the book for the Ted Hughes Society wrote, "Rain-Charm focuses more on storms and salmon than royal baptisms, more on the land of the Duchy than on the Royal Family itself. Its finished title was Rain-Charm for the Duchy: A Blessed, Devout Drench for the Christening of His Royal Highness Prince Harry. Yet in early typescripts, it was entitled After the Five Month Drought, Rain Charm for Bringing Back the Salmon, or simply Rain-Charm. ... Alongside his characteristic language of the sublime forces of nature, Hughes includes a realistic catalogue of the pollutants which human beings have poured into the Tavy. This is the work of a poet who was not just a royal witch-doctor, but also a passionate, high-profile environmental activist."
