= Andrew Davidson (illustrator) =

British artist

Andrew Timothy Davidson
- Born: 13 May 1958 (age 67)
- Awards: Kurt Maschler Award (1985)

Andrew Timothy Davidson (born 13 May 1958) is a British artist. His book illustrations include two novels by Ted Hughes: The Iron Man (1985 edition, orig. 1968) and its sequel The Iron Woman (1993). Another is a 2002 edition of Jack London's The Call of the Wild (orig. 1903). Some time after that, Andrew illustrated for the book Tales of the Peculiar (orig. 2016) by Ransom Riggs.

Davidson has two general artistic styles, one of them is more minimalist and colorful. On the other side, for his most famous illustrations he has a more detailed style, he tends to use a scale of grays when drawing this way.

Hughes and Davidson won the Kurt Maschler Award for The Iron Man in 1985. The British award annually recognised one "work of imagination for children, in which text and illustration are integrated so that each enhances and balances the other." (The Iron Man has been illustrated by several artists – George Adamson in its 1968 first edition.)

Davidson has designed postage stamps for the UK's Royal Mail, including the 1993 "Sherlock Holmes" set, The Station, in the 2003 "British Pub Signs" set, four of 2010's "Business and Consumer Smilers", Paralympic Games - Equestrian in the "Olympyc Games and Paralympic Games 2012" set, the September 2018 "Postal Heritage: Mail by Bike" set and the same year's Christmas stamps.

In 2013, he was commissioned by Bloomsbury and Webb & Webb to create wood engravings to illustrate the book covers of the new adult editions of the Harry Potter series.
