= Kaye Umansky =

English children's author and poet (born 1946)

- Born: 6 December 1946 (age 79); Plymouth, Devon, England
- Occupation: Novelist
- Writing career
- Notable work: Pongwiffy series
- Website: www.kayeumansky.com

Kaye Umansky (/ˈkeɪ əˈmænskiː/; born 6 December 1946) is an English children's author and poet. She has written over 130 books for children and her work ranges from picture books to novels. She is best known for the Pongwiffy & Jim Series.

== Early life ==
Kaye Umansky was born in Plymouth, Devon. Her mother was a music teacher and encouraged her to play from a young age and her father was also a teacher who encouraged her reading.

After Umansky left school, she went to London to train as a teacher. Kaye enjoyed teaching music, drama and creative writing, but not mathematics. Alongside her husband, Kaye formed a soul band and played in the evenings and at weekends; she says they "never became rich and famous, but we had a lot of fun".

== Personal life ==
Umansky lives in North London with her husband Mo, an engineer; they have been together over 30 years. She has a daughter named Ella.

== Career ==
Umansky's first children's book was published in 1986. The book was a collection of songs for children and was called Phantasmagoria. Kaye still writes music books, along with plays, poems, novels and picture books. But she is best known as the creator of Pongwiffy

She cites Richmal Crompton and Terry Pratchett as two of her biggest literary influences and her style has been compared to that of Roald Dahl and Eva Ibbotson.

In 2008, she was a judge for the inaugural Roald Dahl Funny Prize for humorous children's literature.

== Pongwiffy ==
Originally published by A & C Black, then in paperback by Penguin Books, the first Pongwiffy book, Pongwiffy: A Witch of Dirty Habits, was published in 1987. They are now published by Bloomsbury Publishing and Pongwiffy's '21st Birthday' was recently celebrated with the release of the seventh title in the series, Pongwiffy: Back on Track.

They have been published in various countries in Europe. They have published as audio books, read by Prunella Scales, and as a cartoon TV series of 13 episodes which was first aired on ITV1 between June & September 2002. Pongwiffy was voiced by Dawn French and Pongwiffy's best friend, Sharkadder, was voiced by Jennifer Saunders.

In 2010 a new Pongwiffy title appeared in a flip-book alongside a story by Phillip Ardagh as one of the official publications for World Book Day.

== Awards ==
The 1993 Nottinghamshire Book Award for Pongwiffy and the Spell of the Year; the 1999 Times Educational Supplement Junior Music Book Award for Three Rapping Rats; the 2005 Spoken Word Award for the audio version of The Silver Spoon Of Solomon Snow, read by Rik Mayall.

== Publications ==
=== 4 Spooky Stories series ===
Four scary stories written in verse, the last is a compilation.

- The Night I Was Chased By A Vampire (1994)
- The Empty Suit Of Armour (1994)
- The Bogey-men and the Trolls Next Door (1994)
- The Spooks Step Out (1994)

=== Buster Gutt series ===
About a Pirate called Buster Gutt and his arch enemy Admiral Ainsley Goldglove.

- Buster's Big Surprise (2003)
- Buster Gutt (2003)
- Buster and the Golden Glove (2003)

=== Clover Twig series ===
- Clover Twig and the Magical Cottage (2009)
- Clover Twig and the Perilous Path (2010)

=== Curtain Up! series ===
The Curtain Up! series are plays written for primary school children, ages 5–12.

- Cinderella (1995)
- Noah's Ark (1995)
- The Emperor's New Clothes (1996)
- Sleeping Beauty (2000)
- The Snow Queen (2003)

=== Elsie Pickles series ===
- Witch for a Week (2017)
- Wish for a Witch (2018)
- Witches (Un)Welcome (2019)
- Witch in Winter (2019)

=== Giant series ===
The Giant books follows Waldo the Giant and his beloved, Heavy Hetty. They are illustrated by Doffy Weir.

- The Romantic Giant (1992)
- The Jealous Giant (1995)
- The Dressed Up Giant (1998)

=== Goblinz series ===
Three stories of a gaggle of Goblins.

- Goblinz (2002)
- Goblinz Detectives Inc (2004)
- Goblinz and the Witch (2005)

=== Jim series ===
Stories told in rhyme for 3-7 year olds.

- Pass the Jam, Jim (1992)
- You can Swim, Jim (1997)
- Need a Trim, Jim (1999)
- Three Days With Jim (2001)
- This is Jane, Jim (2002)

=== Nonsense Rhymes series ===
The Nonsense Rhymes series are a collections of rhymes, illustrated by Chris Fisher.

- Nonsense Counting Rhymes (1999)
- Nonsense Animal Rhymes (2001)
- Nonsense Fairytale Rhymes (2006)

=== PlayReaders series ===
The PlayReaders series consists of four short plays.

- Bandybones (1986)
- Little Sister (1986)
- The Toymaker's (1986)
- Litter Bugs (1987)

=== Pongwiffy series ===
- Pongwiffy (1987)
- Pongwiffy and the Goblin's Revenge / Broom-napped (1990)
- Pongwiffy and the Spell of the Year (1992)
- Pongwiffy and the Holiday of Doom (1994)
- Pongwiffy and the Pantomime (1996)
- Pongwiffy and the Spello-vision Song Contest (2003)
- Pongwiffy Back On Track (2009)
- Pongwiffy and the Important Announcement (2010) — published dos-à-dos with Grubtown Tales: The Great Pasta Disaster
- Tales from Witchway Wood: Crash 'n' Bang (2011)

=== The Quest for 100 Gold Coins series ===
The Quest for 100 Gold Coins series is a four-part adventure about Nev Niceguy and his quest.

- Donkey Ride to Disaster (1998)
- Madness in the Mountains (1999)
- Strange Days at Sea (2000)
- No More Master Niceguy (2000)

=== Sir Quinton Quest series ===
The Sir Quinton Quest series follows an explorer and his faithful long-suffering butler, Muggins who go off on expeditions.

- Sir Quinton Quest Hunts the Yeti (1992)
- Sir Quinton Quest Hunts the Jewel (1994)
- The Yeti Hunts for Sir Quinton! (1993)

=== Solomon Snow series ===
A mock-Victorian adventure of a young Solomon Snow, his friend Prudence, a six-year-old girl named Rosabella, and her cute little bunny, Mr. Skippy.

- Solomon Snow and the Silver Spoon (2004)
- Solomon Snow and the Stolen Jewel (2005)

=== Sophie Rabbit series ===
The Sophie Rabbit series are about a rabbit called Sophie. They are illustrated by Anna Curry.

- Sophie and Abigail (1995)
- Sophie and the Wonderful Picture (1995)
- Sophie and the Mother's Day Card (1995)
- Sophie In Charge (1995)

=== Story Street books ===
The Story Street books were written for a Literacy Scheme in the UK, for 4-10 year olds.

- Aha! (2000)
- Beyond Strange Street (2000)
- The Carnival (2000)
- Clang! (2000)
- Dinosaur Adventure (2000)
- Down the Rushing River (2000)
- Gong! (2000)
- I am Miss Cherry (2000)
- Jojo in the Jungle (2000)
- Jumbo (2000)
- The Magic Button (2000)
- The Missing Shoes (2000)
- Moon Adventure (2000)
- Pirates Ahoy! (2000)
- Pond (2000)
- Poor Sam (2000)
- Rope that Cow (2000)
- The Rubbish Monster (2000)
- Soup with Obby (2000)
- Stop Thief! (2000)
- Strange Street Again (2000)
- Sunita and the Wishing Well (2000)
- Up the Dizzy Mountain (2000)
- What a Mess (2000)
- Wizard Wagoo (2000)

=== Three series ===
The Three series uses traditional stories and music.

- Three Singing Pigs (1993)
- Three Rapping Rats (1996)
- Three Tapping Teddies (1998)
- Three Rocking Crocs (2006)

=== The Weirds series ===
The Weirds series tell stories about the Weird Family. They are illustrated by Chris Mould.

- Meet The Weirds (2003)
- Weird Happen-ings (2004)
- Wildly Weird (2006)

=== Wilma's Adventures series ===
The stories of Wilma, a Wicked Queen in training.

- Wilma's Wicked Revenge (2000)
- Wilma's Wicked Spell (2002)

=== Standalone books ===
- Big Iggy (1987)
- Phantas-magoria (1987)
- Witches In Stitches (1987)
- King Keith and the Nasty Case of Dragonitus (1988)
- The Fwog Pwince - the Twuth (1989)
- King Keith and the Jolly Lodger (1990)
- The Misfortunes of Captain Cadaverous (1990)
- Trash Hits (1990)
- Tiger and Me (1991)
- Do Not Open Before Christmas Day (1992)
- Tin Can Hero (1992)
- Never Meddle With Magic Mirrors (1993)
- Hammy House of Horror (1995)
- A Ruby, A Rug and a Prince Called Doug (1995)
- Tickle My Nose (1995)
- Beyond the Beanstalk (1997)
- Dobbin (1997)
- Wiggle My Toes (2000)
- Prince Dandy-pants and the Masked Avenger (2001)
- Cruel Times (2002)
- Humble Tom's Big Trip (2002)
- He's Behind You (2003)
- Mick McMenace, Ghost Detective (2003)
- The Snow Queen (2003)
- A Chair For Baby Bear (2004)
- My Very First Joke Book (2004)
- Horses' Holiday (2005)
- I Want A Pet (2005)
- I Am A Tree (2006)
- Three Little Nativities (2006)
- I Don't Like Gloria (2007)
- Let's Go To London (2007)
