= The Iron Man (novel) =

1968 novel by Ted Hughes

The Iron Man: A Children's Story in Five Nights
- Adamson cover of first edition
- Author: Ted Hughes
- Illustrator: George Adamson (first); Andrew Davidson (1985); Chris Mould (2019)
- Genre: Science fiction
- Published: 1968 (Faber and Faber, UK); 1968 (Harper & Row, US); 1985 (Faber and Faber, int'l); 1999 (Knopf, 30th Anniv. Ed.)
- Publication place: United Kingdom
- Media type: Print
- Pages: 59 pp.
- Followed by: The Iron Woman

The Iron Man: A Children's Story in Five Nights is a 1968 science fiction novel by English writer Ted Hughes, first published by Faber and Faber in the UK with illustrations by George Adamson.

Described by some as a modern fairy tale, it narrates the unexpected arrival in England of a giant "metal man" of unknown origin who rains destruction on the countryside by eating industrial farm equipment, before befriending a small boy and defending the world from a dragon which attacks from outer space. Expanding the narrative beyond a criticism of warfare and inter-human conflict, Hughes later wrote a sequel, The Iron Woman (1993), describing retribution based on environmental themes related to pollution.

== Story ==
The Iron Man arrives seemingly from nowhere, and his appearance is described in detail. He first appears falling off a cliff, but his various pieces reassemble themselves, starting with his hands finding his eyes and progressing from there. He is unable to find one ear, which was taken by seagulls earlier, and walks into the sea to find it.

He eventually returns to the country and begins to feed on local farm equipment. When the farm hands discover their destroyed tractors and excavators, a trap is set consisting of a covered pit on which a red lorry is set as bait. Hogarth, a local boy, lures the Iron Man to the trap. The plan succeeds, and the Iron Man is buried alive. The next spring, the Iron Man digs himself free of the pit. To keep him out of the way, Hogarth brings the Iron Man to a scrap-heap to feast. The Iron Man promises not to cause further trouble for the locals, as long as no one troubles him.

Time passes, and the Iron Man is treated as merely another member of the community. However, astronomers monitoring the sky make a frightening new discovery: an enormous space-being, resembling a dragon, moving from orbit to land on Earth. The creature (soon dubbed the "Space-Bat-Angel-Dragon") crashes heavily on Australia (which it is large enough to cover the whole of) and demands that humanity provide him with food (anything alive) or he will take it by force.

Terrified, humans send their armies to destroy the dragon, but it is unharmed by their weapons. When the Iron Man hears of this global threat, he allows himself to be disassembled and transported to Australia where he challenges the creature to a contest of strength. If the Iron Man can withstand the heat of burning petroleum for longer than the creature can withstand the heat of the Sun, the creature must obey the Iron Man's commands forevermore: if the Iron Man melts or is afraid of melting before the space being undergoes or fears pain in the Sun, the creature has permission to devour the whole Earth.

After playing this game for two rounds, the dragon is so badly burned that he no longer appears physically frightening. The Iron Man by contrast has only a deformed ear-lobe to show for his pains. The alien creature admits defeat. When asked why he came to Earth, the dragon reveals that he is a peaceful "star spirit" who experienced excitement about the ongoing sights and sounds produced by the violent warfare of humanity. In his own life, he was a singer of the "music of the spheres"; the harmony of his kind that keeps the cosmos in balance in stable equilibrium.

The Iron Man orders the dragon to sing to the inhabitants of Earth, flying just behind the sunset, to help soothe humanity toward a sense of peace. The beauty of his music distracts the population from its egocentrism and tendency to fight, causing the first worldwide lasting peace.

== Publishing ==
The first North American edition was also published in 1968, by Harper & Row with illustrations by Robert Nadler. Its main title was changed to The Iron Giant, and internal mentions of the metal man changed accordingly, to avoid confusion with the Marvel Comics character Iron Man. Modern American editions have continued the practice, as Iron Man has since become an icon of popular culture, as well as spawning a multimedia franchise.

Faber and Faber published a new edition in 1985 with illustrations by Andrew Davidson, for which Hughes and Davidson won the Kurt Maschler Award, or the Emils. From 1982 to 1999 that award recognised one British "work of imagination for children, in which text and illustration are integrated so that each enhances and balances the other." The 1985 Davidson edition was published in Britain and America (retaining 'giant') and there were re-issues with the Davidson illustrations, including some with other cover artists. Yet the novel has been re-illustrated by at least two others, Dirk Zimmer and Laura Carlin (current, Walker Books).

In August 2019, an updated illustrated version was released in the UK with new illustrations from artist Chris Mould.

== Adaptations ==
- Pete Townshend produced a musical concept album based on the novel in 1989.
- In 1999, Warner Bros. released an animated film using the novel as a basis, titled The Iron Giant, directed by Brad Bird and co-produced by Pete Townshend.

== Bibliography ==
- The Iron Man, illus. by George Adamson. London: Faber and Faber, 26 February 1968 ISBN 0571 08247 5
- The Iron Giant, illus. by Robert Nadler. New York: Harper & Row, 23 October 1968
- The Iron Man, illus. by George Adamson. London: Faber and Faber, 11 October 1971 (paperback edition) ISBN 0571 09750 2
- L'Uomo di Ferro: Lotta di giganti per la salvezza della terra, transl. into Italian of The Iron Man by Sandra Georgini, illus. by George Adamson. Milan: Biblioteca Universale, Rizzoli, 1977
- The Iron Man, illus. by George Adamson: “English language textbook with Japanese annotations” by Yuuichi Hashimoto. Tokyo: Shinozaki Shorin, 1980
- A Vasember, transl. into Hungarian of The Iron Man by Katalin Damokos, illus. György Korga . Budapest: Móra Könyvkiadó, 1981 ISBN 978-963-11-2373-9
- Le Géant de fer, transl. into French of The Iron Man by Sophie de Vogelas; illus. by Philippe Munch; Folio cadet 52. Éditions Gallimard Jeunesse, 1984 ISBN 978-2-07-031052-4
- The Iron Man, illus. by Andrew Davidson. London: Faber and Faber, 1985 ISBN 978-0-571-13675-9 (cased); ISBN 978-0-571-13677-3 (paperback)
- The Iron Giant, illus. by Dirk Zimmer. New York: Harper & Row, 1988 ISBN 978-0-06-022638-1
- The Iron Man, illus. by Andrew Davidson. London: Faber and Faber, 1989 ISBN 978-0-571-14149-4 (paperback)
- Le Géant de fer, transl. into French of The Iron Man by Sophie de Vogelas; illus. by Jean Torton; Folio cadet 295. Éditions Gallimard Jeunesse, 1992 ISBN 978-2-07-052686-4
- Rautamies, transl. into Finnish of The Iron Man by Sinikka Sajama; illus. Andrew Davidson. Karkkila: Kustannus-Mäkelä, 1993 ISBN 978-951-873-267-2
- Der Eisenmann, transl. into German of The Iron Man by U.-M. Gutzschhahn, illus. by Jindra Čapek. Frankfurt-am-Main: S. Fischer (Fischer Taschenbuch) 1997 ISBN 3-596-80154-0
- The Iron Giant, illus. by Andrew Davidson. New York: Alfred A. Knopf, 1999 ISBN 978-0-375-80167-9; (reprinted as a paperback by Yearling Books, an imprint of Random House ISBN 978-0-375-80153-2)
- L'Uomo di ferro, transl. into Italian of The Iron Man by Ilva Tron; illus. by Andrew Davidson; Junior Mondadori series. Milan: Mondadori, 2003 ISBN 88-04-43681-6
- Y dyn haearn, transl. into Welsh of The Iron Man by Emily Huws; illus. by Andrew Davidson. Llanrwst: Gwasg Carreg Gwalch, 2004 ISBN 978-0-86381-936-0
- The Iron Man, illus. by Tom Gauld. London: Faber and Faber, 2005 ISBN 978-0-571-22612-2
- The Iron Man, illus. by Laura Carlin. London: Walker Books in collaboration with Faber and Faber, 2010 ISBN 978-1-4063-2957-5
- El hombre de hierro, illus. by Laura Carlin. Barcelona: Vicens Vives, 2011 ISBN 9788468206219 OCLC 794039831
- The Iron Man, illus. by Andrew Davidson. London: Faber and Faber, 2013 ISBN 978-0-571-30224-6 (paperback)
- L'Uomo di ferro, transl. into Italian of The Iron Man by Ilva Tron, illus. by I. Bruno. Milan: Oscar junior, Mondadori, 2013 ISBN 978-88-04-62032-7
