= North Tawton Town Hall =

Municipal building in North Tawton, Devon, England

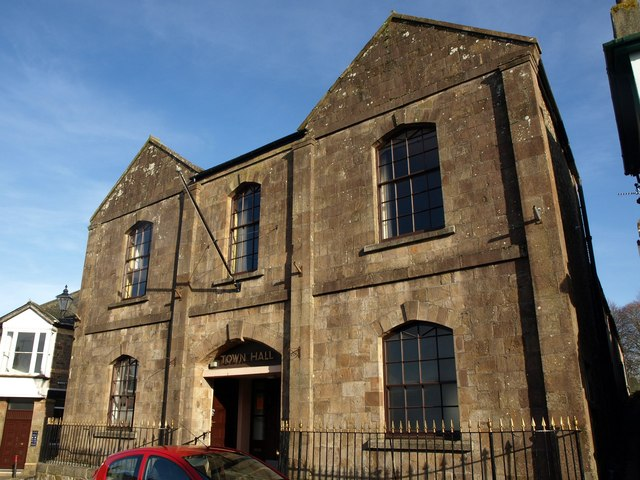
- North Tawton Town Hall

- Shown in Devon
- 50.7998°N 3.8974°W
- Location: The Square, North Tawton

History
- Built: 1849

Site notes
- Architectural style: Neoclassical style

Listed Building – Grade II
- Official name: Town Hall, including railings at front, The Square
- Designated: 8 October 1987
- Reference no.: 1105310

North Tawton Town Hall is a municipal building in The Square, North Tawton, Devon, England. The town hall, which is used for public events, is a Grade II listed building.

== History ==
Markets had been held in the town since 1270 but were abandoned due to lack of trade in 1720: in the early 1840s civic leaders set about reviving the markets and decided to commission a new market hall financed by public subscription.

The new building was designed in the neoclassical style, built by a local builder, J. Parish, in ashlar stone at a cost of £750 and was completed in 1849. The design involved a symmetrical main frontage with three bays facing The Square; the central bay featured, on the ground floor, a segmental doorway with a fanlight, an architrave and a keystone, and, on the first floor, a segmental sash window. The outer bays were fenestrated by segmental sash windows on both floors and surmounted by pedimented gables. All three bays were flanked by full-height pilasters. Internally, there was an entrance hall with reception rooms on either side.

The building was used as an events venue from an early stage and concerts in the 19th century included an orchestral performance with violins and piano led by the local concert pianist, George James Robertson, in February 1883. In the 19th century, petty session hearings alternated between Chudleigh Town Hall and North Tawton Town Hall.

For much of the 20th century the parish of North Tawton was administered by Okehampton Rural District Council, but, following the implementation of local government re-organisation in 1974, North Tawton elected its own town council with public meetings held in the town hall. In 2005, North Tawton was used as the location for the filming of Jennifer Saunders' BBC television series Jam & Jerusalem: the town represented the fictional Clatterford St Mary and the town hall featured prominently in the series. A local theatre group, Actors of North Tawton Society, maintained the tradition of delivering concerts, pantomimes and plays in the town hall into the 21st century.
