= Den Brook Wind Farm =

Wind farm in Devon, England

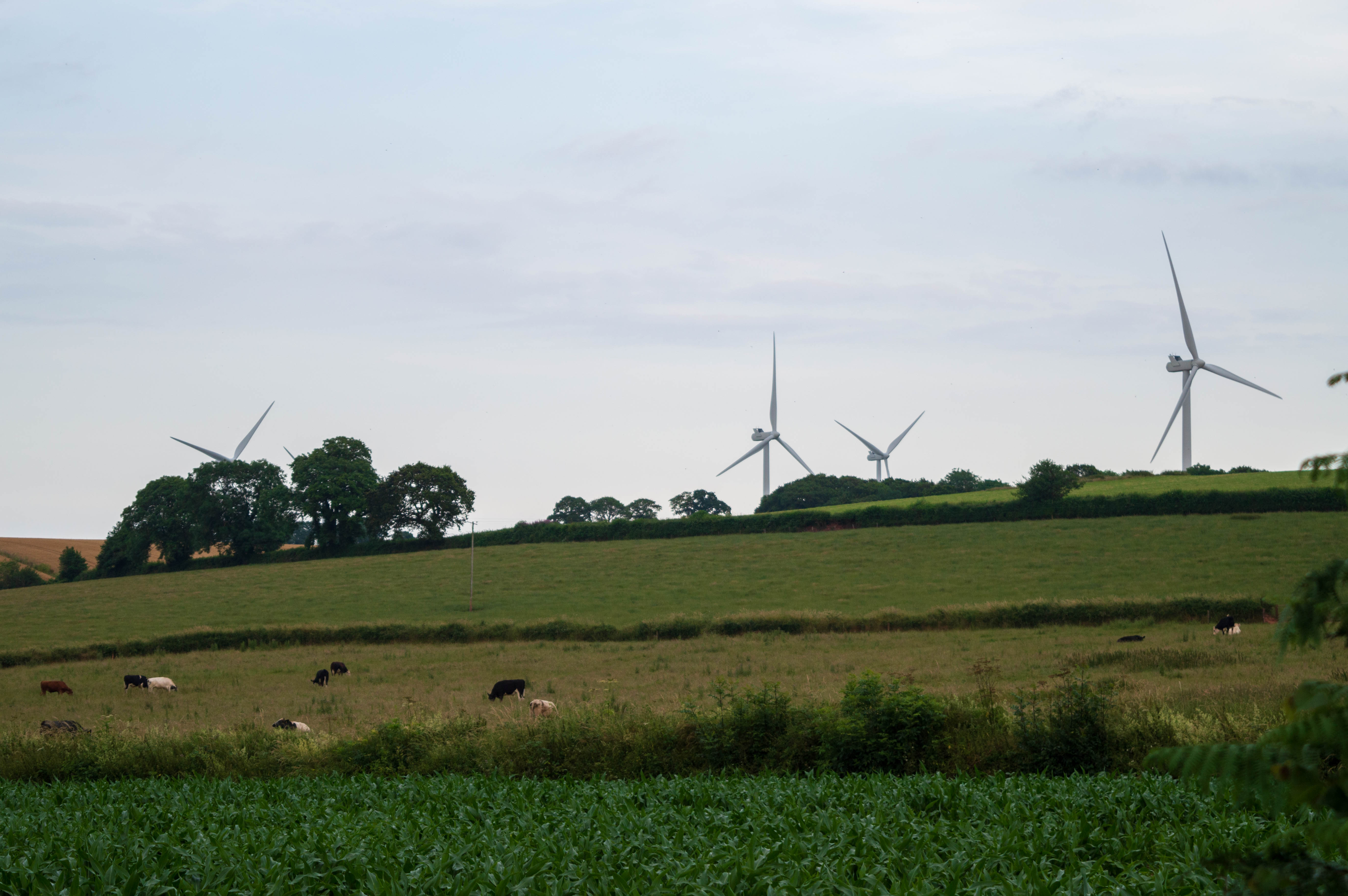
- View from North Tawton
- Country: England
- Location: near North Tawton, Devon
- Coordinates: 50.785°N 3.863°W
- Status: Operating
- Commission date: 2016
- Owner: Renewable Energy Systems

Wind farm
- Hub height: 80 m
- Rotor diameter: 80 m

Power generation
- Units operational: Nine
- Nameplate capacity: 18 MW

External links
- Website: www.den-brook.co.uk

Den Brook Wind Farm is a windfarm in Devon, England. The windfarm is located 2 kilometres (1.2 mi) south-east of North Tawton and 2.5 kilometres (1.6 mi) south-west of Bow, and comprises nine 2 MW wind turbines, each 120 metres (390 ft) high. Developer Renewable Energy Systems (RES) received planning consent for the project in December 2009, following a long planning process which included two public inquiries and a judicial review.

RES initially put forward proposals for a windfarm at Den Brook in 2004, and in response the Den Brook Valley Action Group was established to oppose the plan. A key concern was the potential impact of noise on local residents. In 2006, West Devon Borough Council refused planning permission for the scheme, but RES appealed, and consent was granted in early 2007 following a public inquiry. Still concerned about noise issues, local residents the formed Den Brook Judicial Review Group which pursued a judicial appeal. This resulted in the inquiry decision being overturned, and a second public inquiry was held in October 2009, following which permission was once more granted, subject to a number of planning conditions. A second legal challenge was rejected in August 2010. In 2011, the windfarm was the subject of a television documentary series, Windfarm Wars, broadcast by BBC Two, which followed the history of the project.

== Planning history ==
RES initially publicised two alternate proposals for Den Brook in 2004: a scheme of ten 100-metre (330 ft) turbines; and a scheme of 19 80-metre (260 ft) turbines. Following consultation, a layout of nine 120-metre (390 ft) turbines was developed. Also in 2004, RES erected an anemometer mast to measure wind speed, and undertook background noise monitoring.

=== Planning application ===
By April 2005, Den Brook Valley Action Group (DBVAG) had been formed, and was flying a balloon at the site to mark the height of the proposed turbines. The planning application was submitted to West Devon Borough Council (WDBC) in November 2005. Objections to the proposal came from the Campaign to Protect Rural England, Mid Devon District Council, and from 2,915 objection letters, all citing grounds including visual impact, noise, and residential amenity. Dartmoor National Park and the Dartmoor Preservation Association also objected, as the site is located around 5.5 kilometres (3.4 mi) from the national park boundary. 71 letters of support were also received. WDBC planning officers recommended refusal of planning permission, on the grounds of visual impacts, and potential impacts on the historic environment. On 31 January 2006 the council voted to accept the recommendation, and refused planning permission.

Four months later, RES announced their intention to appeal to the Planning Inspectorate against the decision, and to seek a public inquiry. The inquiry was held in November 2006, at which the appeal was opposed by representatives of WDBC and DBVAG. In February 2007 the appeal was allowed by the planning inspector, and planning permission granted.

=== Judicial review ===
In March 2007, the Den Brook Judicial Review Group (DBJRG) was formed by local residents. Headed by Mike Hulme, whose property was one of the closest dwellings to the proposed site, the group came together over concerns regarding the potential for noise pollution from the turbines. A key concern was the potential for sleep disturbance due to a phenomenon known as amplitude modulation. This form of noise, which has been reported at a small number of windfarm sites, is poorly understood.

DBJRG launched an appeal, under Section 288 of the Town and Country Planning Act 1990, to the High Court, which was heard in March 2008 by Justice Mitting. A key issue was the refusal of RES to release the background noise data to Mr Hulme, to allow independent analysis. Although he criticised the approach taken by RES, Justice Mitting refused to overturn the result of the inquiry, since the planning inspector had not made a legal error in coming to his decision. In May, RES released the noise data, and errors were subsequently discovered by DBJRG, although RES denied that they were significant. DBJRG then took their case to the Court of Appeal, and permission to appeal was granted in June 2008. To avoid the need for another court hearing a consent order was agreed between DBJRG and the Secretary of State for Communities and Local Government (the defendant in the case), which had the effect of overturning the planning inquiry, and returning the matter to the Planning Inspectorate.

=== Second public inquiry ===
The second public inquiry was initially scheduled for March 2009, but was postponed at the request of DBJRG, who had not then had sufficient time to review new noise data supplied by RES. The inquiry took place between July and October 2009, with the appeal being opposed by WDBC, DBJRG, and the Campaign to Protect Rural England. The appeal was once again allowed in December 2009. A number of planning conditions were attached by the inspector, aimed at reducing the likelihood of noise nuisance.

Following the decision, a second judicial appeal was launched by Mike Hulme, which challenged the validity of the planning conditions and claimed that the wording of the noise conditions rendered them ineffective. The case was heard by Judge Frances Patterson QC in July 2010. All ten grounds of the challenge were rejected by the judge in her decision. Hulme went on to lodge an appeal against this decision, which was dismissed by the Court of Appeal in May 2011. Subsequently, RES sought agreement with WDBC on how the planning conditions would be met.

=== Construction ===
Construction commenced in 2015.

== Windfarm Wars ==
The BBC commissioned a documentary on the development of Den Brook Wind Farm shortly after the inception of the project. Including face-to-face interviews with a number individuals concerned with the windfarm, it focused primarily on Rachel Ruffle, project manager for RES, and Mike Hulme, local resident and member of DBJRG. Initially conceived as a single film, it developed into a series as the planning process became more and more protracted. The timescale also consumed most of the programme budget, with producer Jeremy Gibson eventually completing the films as a solo project. The series was first broadcast in May and June 2011.
