= North Tawton =

Town in Devon, England

Coordinates: 50.8°N 3.9°W

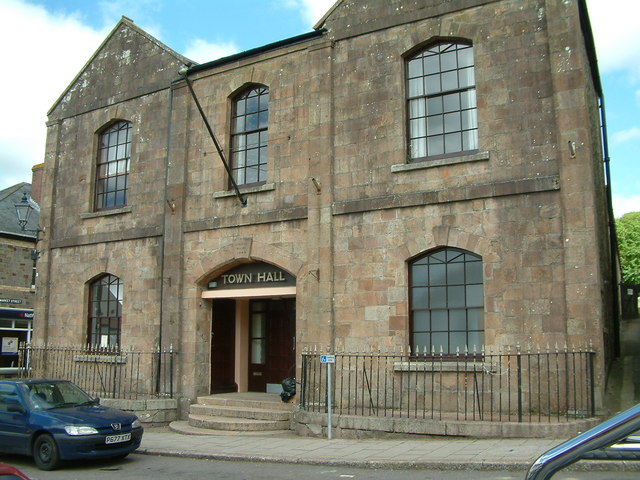
- North Tawton Town Hall

- Location within Devon
- Population: 2,026
- OS grid reference: SX664017
- District: West Devon
- Shire county: Devon
- Region: South West
- Country: England
- Sovereign state: United Kingdom
- Post town: NORTH TAWTON
- Postcode district: EX20
- Dialling code: 01837
- Police: Devon and Cornwall
- Fire: Devon and Somerset
- Ambulance: South Western
- UK Parliament: Devon West and Torridge

North Tawton is a small town in Devon, England, situated on the river Taw. It is administered by West Devon Council. The population of the electoral ward at the census 2011 was 2,026.

== History ==
Romans crossed the River Taw at what is now Newland Mill, a little outside the present town, and established a succession of military camps there over the years. The Roman fort is believed to have had the name Nemetostatio, meaning "The road-station of the sacred groves", and may have been located on the site of an ancient druidic sanctuary. It covered an area of roughly 600 ft (185m) east-west by 390 ft (120m), and was located adjoining the Roman road between Isca Dumnoniorum (Exeter) and Okehampton. In addition, the site of a temporary marching camp has been identified half a mile to the north.

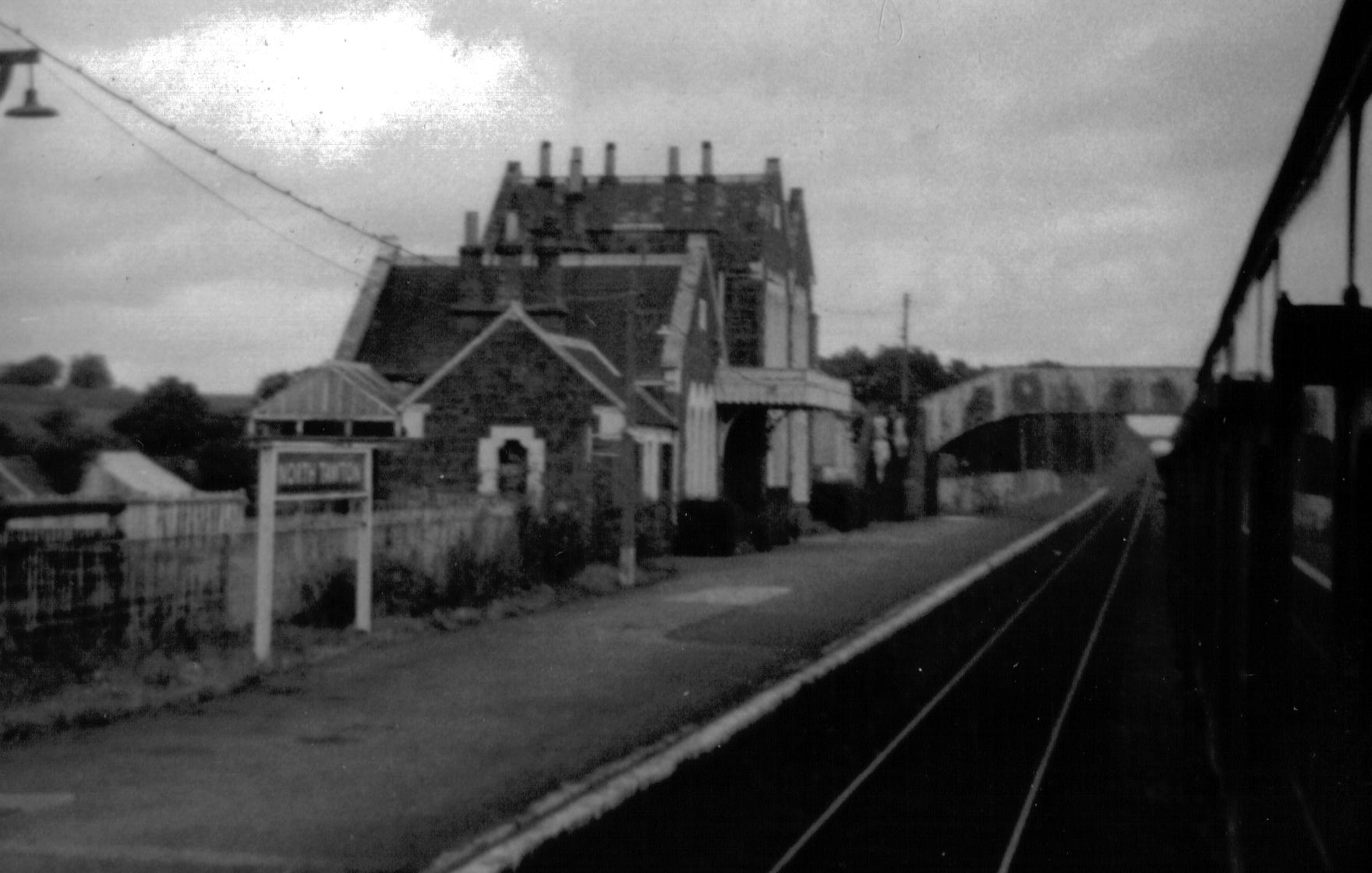
North Tawton station in 1970.

By the time of the Domesday survey (1086), there were six farm / manor holdings in what is now North Tawton Parish, including that of Tawton which was the forerunner of the town we know today.

St Peter's Church is first recorded in 1257. Only the tower of the present building dates from that time, with the rest being mostly 14th and 15th century. The tower is on the west and is topped by an oak-shingled spire. There are two aisles with granite arcades and a number of old benchends.

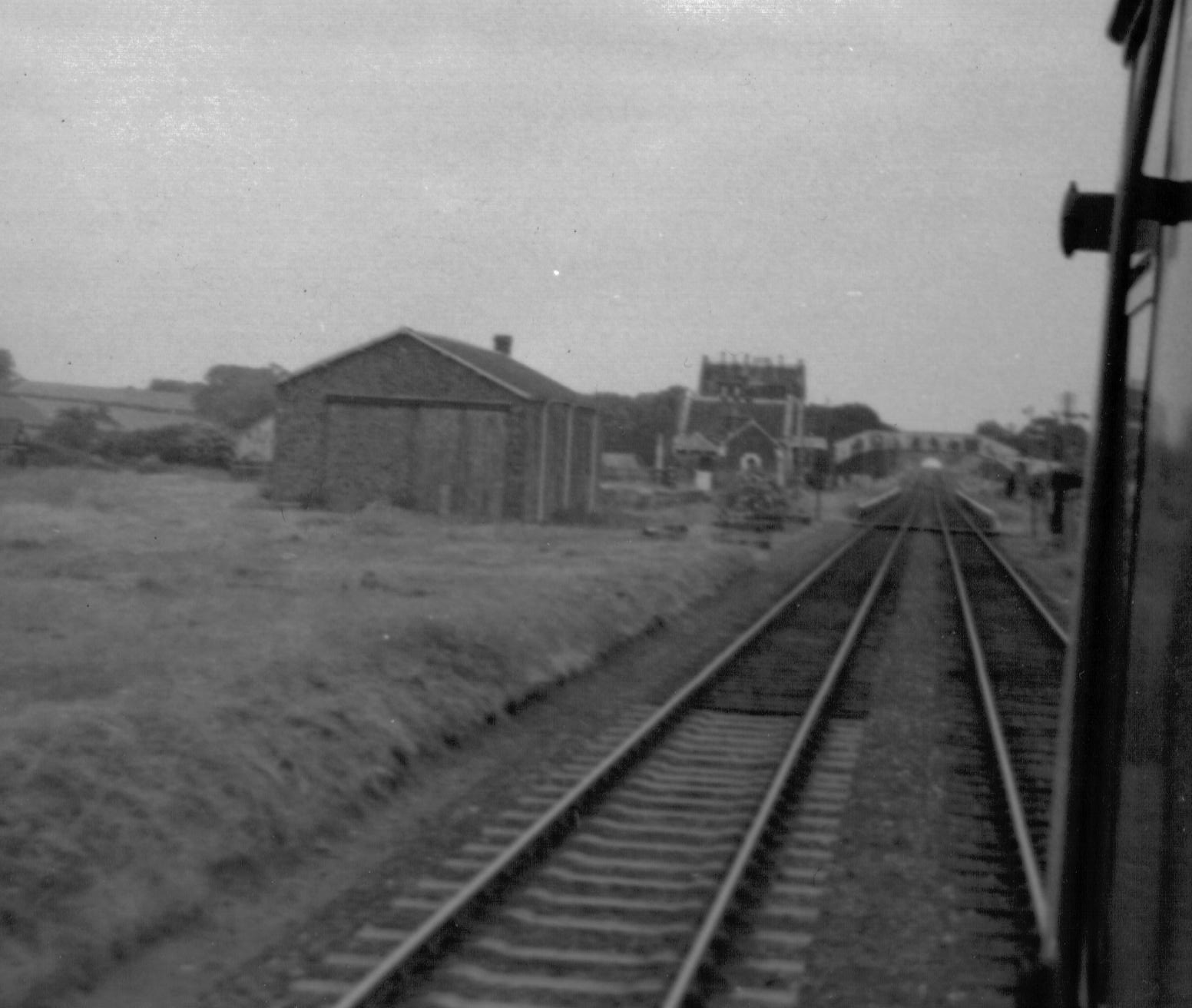
North Tawton station in 1969

North Tawton was already a market town by the end of the 12th century. Agriculture and the woollen industry provided the chief sources of employment for many centuries, but the former has much declined as a source of employment and the latter has gone altogether, the last town woollen mill closing in 1930.

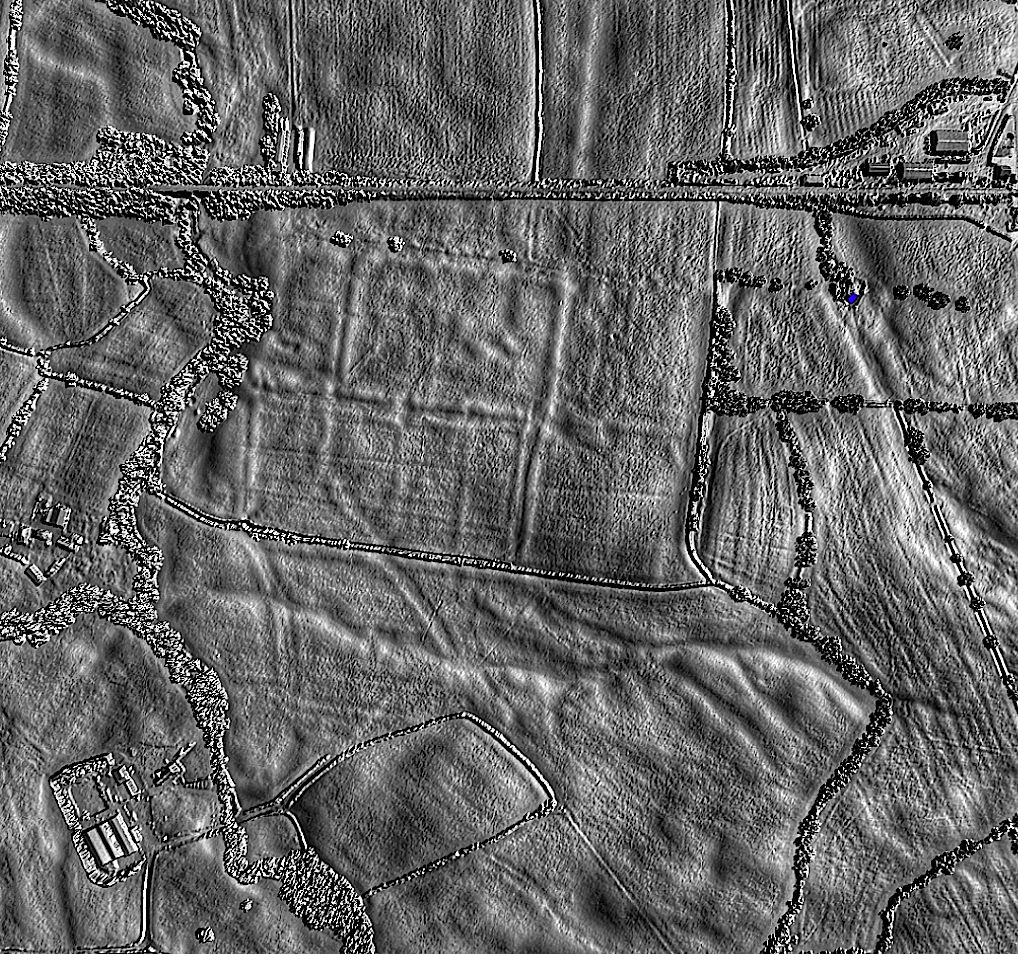
A lidar view of North Tawton 'Roman fort'.'Two Roman forts (two Roman fortlets are located in northwest corner of northern fort) and two marching camps'- Devon & Dartmoor HER

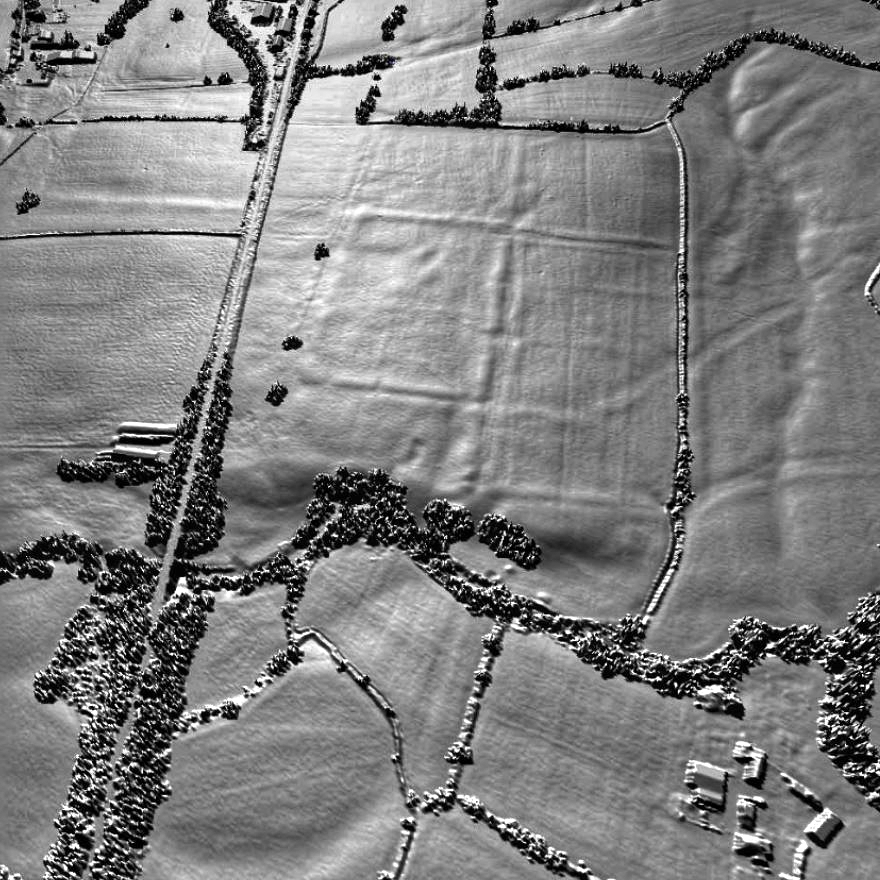
An oblique lidar view from the west of North Tawton Roman fort

The railway came to North Tawton in 1865. North Tawton railway station (now closed) lies a mile or two outside the town on the line from Exeter to Okehampton which continued on to Plymouth and Cornwall. It closed to through passenger traffic in 1968, although a shuttle service between Okehampton and Exeter continued until 1972. The latter recommenced in 2021 but with no intermediate stops between Crediton and Okehampton.

Bathe Pool, a grassy hollow near North Tawton, is said to fill with water at times of national crisis.

== Other notable buildings ==
The former pannier open air market (1849) later became a cinema. Broad Hall is a house dated 1680 but it incorporates the remains of a house of the 15th century. Burton Hall is a mid-Victorian grade two timber house which was brought from Norway. Cottles Barton is an Elizabethan manor house one mile south of the town. Newland Mill on the outside of the village used to be a former mill house; it was built circa 1814, contemporary with the mill, with mid-C19 additions. It was refurbished into living accommodations with the original watermill and wheelhouse incorporated.

== Modern-day ==
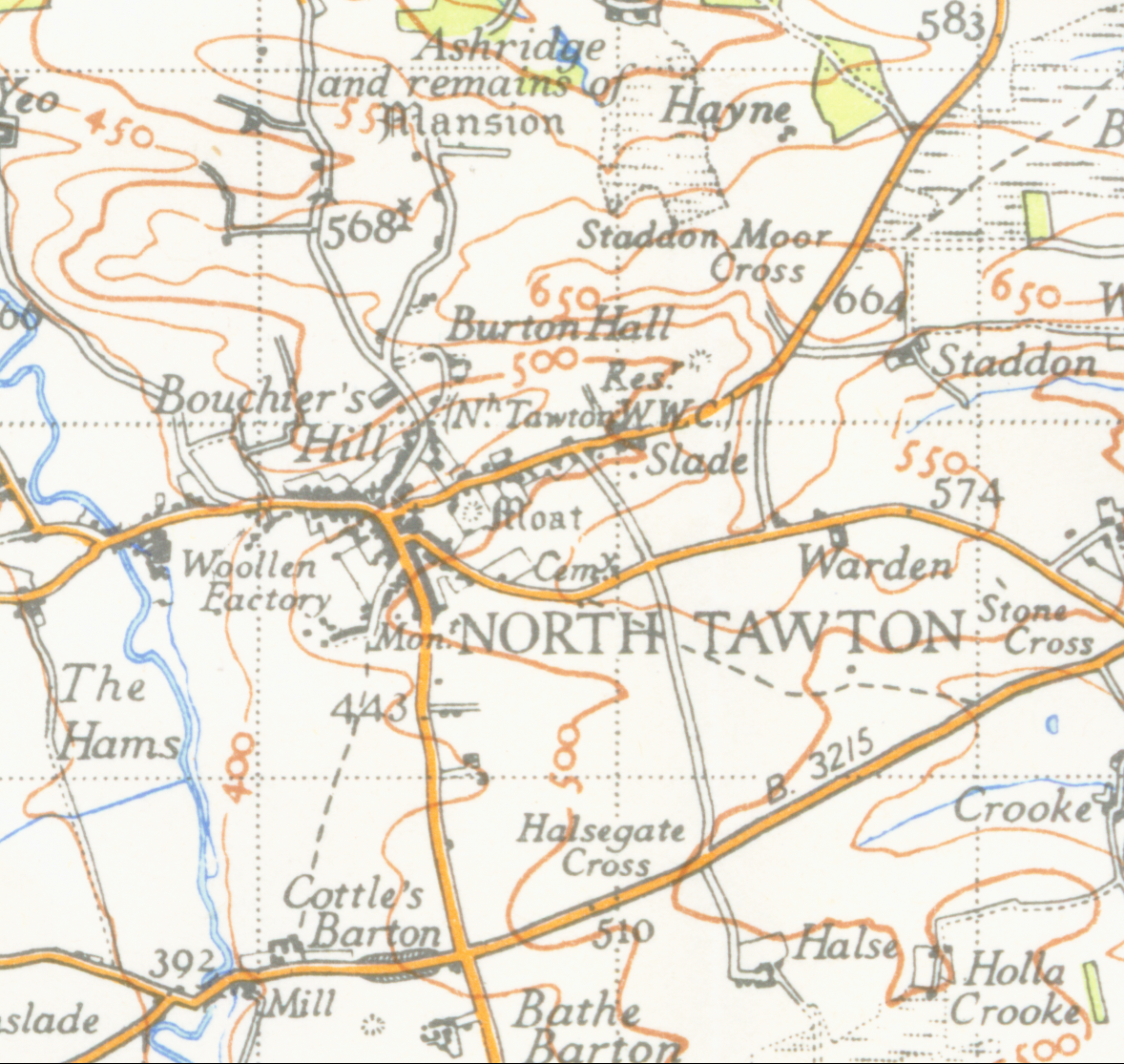
Map of North Tawton from 1946

The town has become something of a centre for light industry. There are three significant employers in the town: the haulier Gregory Distribution, which grew from a local concern founded in the 1920s and now employs 300 locally, the Taw Valley Creamery—a cheese factory originally built by Express Dairies in 1974, employing over 100, and the pet products wholesaler Vital Pet Products, employing around 40 people.

The population currently stands at around 2,026. This is small for a "town", but as a former market town North Tawton has retained this title, and is designated a Post Town by the Royal Mail.

There are a number of bus services:

- 5B – Barnstaple to Exeter
- 5A – Okehampton / Hatherleigh to Exeter
- 318 – Okehampton

== Notable people ==
The doctor William Budd (1811–1880) was born in the town, son of Samuel Budd, the local surgeon. His researches into the incidence of typhoid during an epidemic in the town led to him establishing that typhoid fever was spread contagiously, and in particular that the infection was excreted and could be contracted by drinking contaminated water. This discovery contributed to national improvements in public health through improved sanitation.

The poet Ted Hughes (1930–1998) bought a house, Court Green, in North Tawton, in 1961 with his then-wife Sylvia Plath (1932–1963), who lived there briefly with him until their separation in December 1962. After Plath's suicide, Ted Hughes moved his partner Assia Wevill into Court Green where Assia helped care for Hughes' and Plath's two children, Frieda and Nicholas. In due course Hughes made North Tawton his permanent home, until his fatal myocardial infarction in a Southwark, London, hospital on 28 October 1998, while undergoing treatment for colon cancer.

In 2005, North Tawton was used as the location for the filming of Jennifer Saunders' BBC television series Jam & Jerusalem. The town represented the fictional Clatterford St Mary. St Peter's Church and North Tawton Town Hall featured prominently in the series.

The nearby Den Brook Wind Farm and the residents local to it were featured in a four-part BBC documentary called Windfarm Wars. Broadcast in 2011, the documentary covered the seven years of legal processes involved with the windfarm receiving planning permission. The windfarm was finally constructed in 2016.

== Sport ==
North Tawton has Football, Rugby and Bowling clubs.
