= Shakespeare and the Goddess of Complete Being =

Book of literary criticism by Ted Hughes

- Author: Ted Hughes
- Genre: Literary criticism
- Publisher: Faber Paperbacks
- Publication date: First edition (April 13, 1992)
- Publication place: United Kingdom
- Pages: 524
- ISBN: 978-0571166046

Shakespeare and the Goddess of Complete Being is a book of literary criticism by Ted Hughes extensively analyzing the works of Shakespeare.

- Part one: The Immature Phase of the Tragic Equation
- Part two: The Evolution of the Tragic Equation through the Seven Tragedies
- Part three: The Transformation of the Tragic Equation in the Last Plays

The book also provides an insight into Ted Hughes' gender attitudes.
