= Barry Hutchison =

British writer

Barry Hutchison is a children's author, screenwriter, and director from Scotland. He wrote children's novels for Egmont Press under their 2Heads imprint, including books for the Beastly, Ben 10, and Ben 10: Alien Force series, and signed a six-book contract with HarperCollins in 2008.

In 2013, Hutchison wrote 36 episodes of Bottom Knocker Street, a CITV comedy starring comedian Phill Jupitus.

Since 2019, Hutchison has been releasing Scottish crime novels under the pen name JD Kirk.

He lives in Fort William in the Highlands with his wife, Fiona, and their two children.

== Books for children ==
=== Invisible Fiends ===
- Mr Mumbles (2010)
- Raggy Maggie (2010)
- The Crowmaster (2011)
- Doc Mortis (2011)
- The Beast (2012)
- The Darkest Corners (2012)

=== Afterworlds ===
- The 13th Horseman (2012)
- The Book of Doom (2013)

=== Benjamin Blank ===
- The Shark-Headed Bear Thing (2015)
- The Swivel-Eyed Ogre-Thing (2015)
- The Moon-Faced Ghoul-Thing (2015)

=== Beaky Malone ===
- Beaky Malone: The World's Greatest Liar (2016)

=== Other works ===
Rise of the Rabbits (2015)

== Books for adults (as Barry J Hutchison) ==
The Bug (2016)

=== Space Team ===
- Space Team (2016)
- Space Team: The Wrath of Vajazzle (2016)
- Space Team: The Search for Splurt (2017)
- Space Team: Song of the Space Siren (2017)
- Space Team: The Guns of Nana Joan (2017)
- Space Team: Return of the Dead Guy (2017)
- Space Team: Planet of the Japes (2017)
- Space Team: A Lot of Weird Space Shizz (2017)
- Space Team: The Holiday Special (2018)
- Space Team: The Time Titan of Tomorrow (2018)
- Space Team: The King of Space Must Die (2018)
- Space Team: Sting of the Mustard Mines (2018)
- Space Team: Sentienced to Death (2018)
- Space Team: The Hunt for Reduk Topa (2019)

=== Dan Deadman ===
- Dial D for Deadman (2017)
- Dead Inside (2017)
- Dead in the Water (2018)

=== Sidekicks ===
- The Sidekicks Initiative: A Comedy Superhero Adventure (2018)

== Scottish crime novels (as JD Kirk) ==
=== DCI Logan crime thrillers ===
- A Litter of Bones (2019)
- Thicker Than Water (2019)
- The Killing Code (2019)
- Blood and Treachery (2019)
- The Last Bloody Straw (2020)
- A Whisper of Sorrows (2020)
- The Big Man Upstairs (2020)
- A Death Most Monumental (2020)
- A Snowball's Chance in Hell (2020)
- Ahead of the Game (2021)
- An Isolated Incident (2021)
- Colder than the Grave (2021)
- Come Hell or High Water (2021)
- City of Scars (2022)
- Here Lie the Dead (2022)
- One for the Ages (2023)
- In Service of Death (2023)
- A Dead Man Walking (2024)
- Where the Pieces Lie (2024)
- A Killer of Influence (2024)
- A Rock and a Hard Place (2025)
- Better the Devil (2026)

=== Robert Hoon crime thrillers ===
- Northwind (2020)
- Southpaw (2021)
- Westward (2021)
- Eastgate (2022)
- Stateside (2024)

=== DI Heather Filson crime thrillers ===
- The One That Got Away (2023)
- This Little Piggy (2024)

=== Audible Originals ===
- Him (2025)
- Recall (2026)

=== Psychological Thrillers ===
- My Daughter Is Missing (2025)

=== Constable Tyler Neish Novellas ===
- First Among the Dead (2025)
- Duty of Care (2026)

== Television ==
- Bottom Knocker Street (2013)
- SuperMansion (2018)
- Kip Van Creepy: Delivery Boy (2018)
