= Ted Hughes =

English poet and children's writer (1930–1998)

Ted Hughes OM OBE FRSL
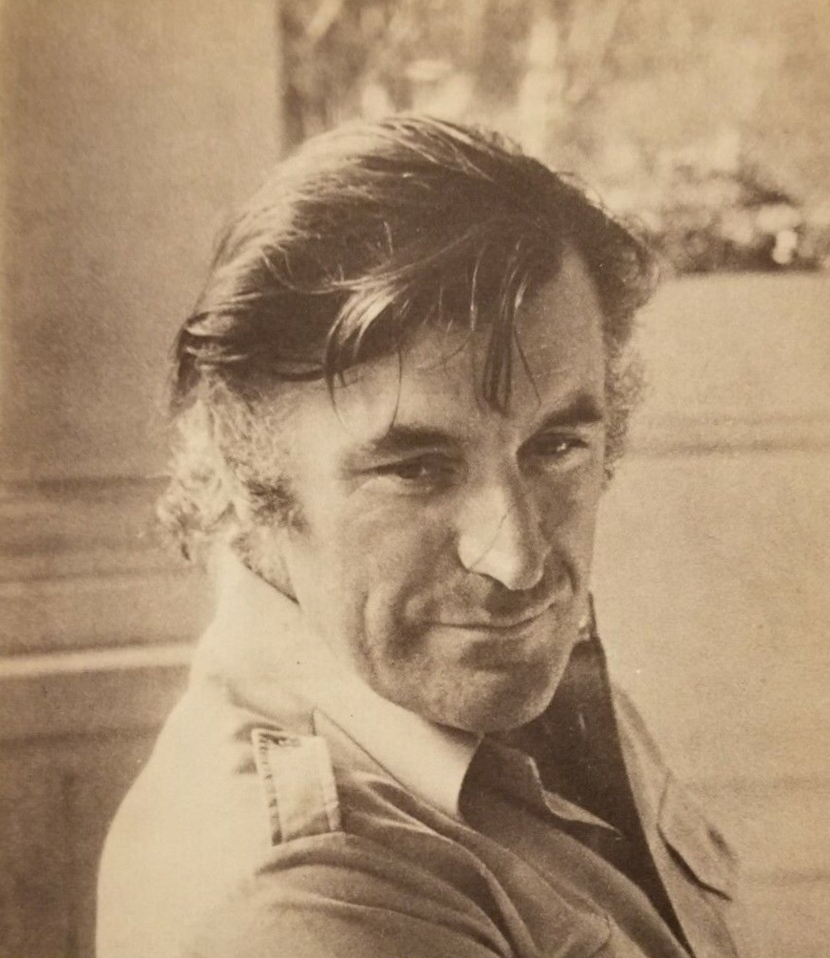
- Hughes c. 1977

Poet Laureate of the United Kingdom
- In office 28 December 1984 – 28 October 1998
- Monarch: Elizabeth II
- Preceded by: Sir John Betjeman
- Succeeded by: Andrew Motion

Personal details
- Born: 17 August 1930 Mytholmroyd, Yorkshire, England
- Died: 28 October 1998 (aged 68) London, England
- Spouses: Sylvia Plath (m. 1956; died 1963); Carol Orchard (m. 1970)
- Domestic partner(s): Assia Wevill (1962–1969)
- Children: Frieda Hughes; Nicholas Hughes; Alexandra Wevill
- Education: Pembroke College, Cambridge
- Occupation: Poet, playwright, writer
- Awards: Somerset Maugham Award 1957 Hawk in the Rain; Guardian Children's Fiction Prize 1984 What is the Truth?; Whitbread Book of the Year 1998 Tales from Ovid

Edward James Hughes (17 August 1930 – 28 October 1998) was an English poet, translator, and children's writer. Critics frequently rank him as one of the best poets of his generation and one of the twentieth century's greatest writers. He was appointed Poet Laureate in 1984 and held the office until his death. In 2008, The Times ranked Hughes fourth on its list of "The 50 greatest British writers since 1945".

Hughes married fellow poet, American Sylvia Plath, in 1956. They lived together in the United States and then in England, in a tumultuous relationship. They had two children before separating in 1962. Plath died by suicide in 1963.

== Biography ==
=== Early life ===
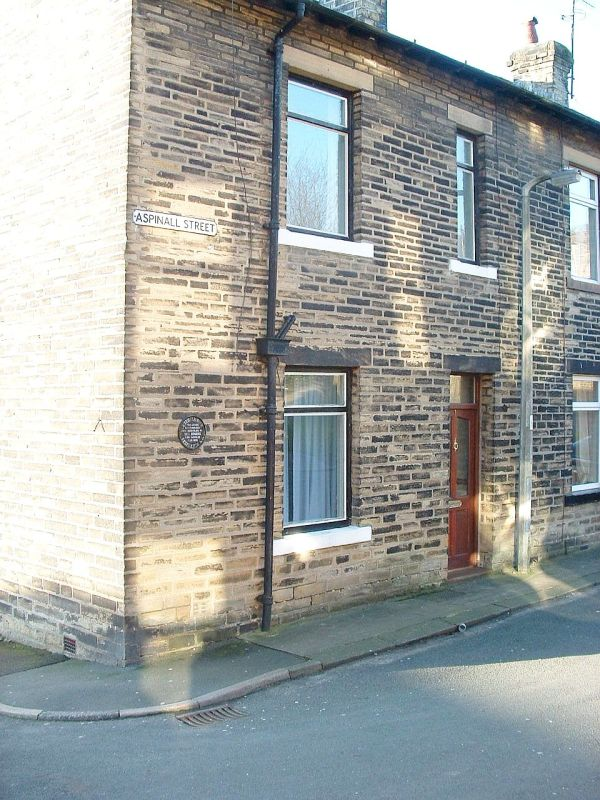
Hughes's birthplace in Mytholmroyd, Yorkshire

Hughes was born at 1 Aspinall Street, in Mytholmroyd in the West Riding of Yorkshire, to William Henry (1894–1981) and Edith (née Farrar) Hughes (1898–1969). He was raised among the local farms of the Calder Valley and on the Pennine moorland. The third child, Hughes had a brother Gerald (1920–2016), who was ten years older. Next came their sister Olwyn Marguerite Hughes (1928–2016), who was two years older than Ted.

One of their mother's ancestors, Nicholas Ferrar, had founded the Little Gidding community. Most of the more recent generations of the family had worked in the clothing and milling industries in the area.

Hughes's father, William, a joiner, was of Irish descent. He had enlisted with the Lancashire Fusiliers in the First World War and fought at Ypres. He narrowly escaped being killed; he was saved when a bullet hit him but lodged in a pay book in his breast pocket. He was one of just 17 men of his regiment to return from the Dardanelles Campaign (1915–16).

The stories of Flanders fields filled Hughes's childhood imagination (later described in the poem "Out"). Hughes noted, "my first six years shaped everything".

Hughes loved hunting and fishing, swimming, and picnicking with his family. He attended the Burnley Road School until he was seven. After his family moved to Mexborough, he attended Schofield Street Junior School. His parents ran a newsagent's and tobacconist's shop in the town.

In Poetry in Making, Hughes recalled that he was fascinated by animals, collecting, and drawing toy lead creatures. He acted as retriever when his elder brother gamekeeper shot magpies, owls, rats, and curlews. He grew up amid the harsh realities of working farms in the valleys and on the moors.

During his time in Mexborough, he explored Manor Farm at Old Denaby. He later said that he came to know it "better than any place on earth". His earliest poem "The Thought Fox", and earliest story "The Rain Horse", were recollections of the area. At the age of about 13 a friend, John Wholey, took Hughes to his home at Crookhill Lodge, on the Crookhill estate above Conisbrough. There the boys could fish and shoot. Hughes became close to the Wholey family and learnt a lot about wildlife from Wholey's father, the head gardener and gamekeeper on the estate. Hughes came to view fishing as an almost religious experience.

Hughes attended Mexborough Secondary School (later Grammar School), where a succession of teachers encouraged him to write, and develop his interest in poetry. Teachers Miss McLeod and Pauline Mayne introduced him to the poets Gerard Manley Hopkins and T.S. Eliot. Hughes was also mentored by teacher John Fisher, and his own sister Olwyn, who was well versed in poetry. Future poet Harold Massingham also attended this school and was mentored by Fisher. In 1946, one of Hughes's early poems, "Wild West", and a short story were published in the grammar school magazine The Don and Dearne. He published further poems in 1948. By 16, he had no other thought than being a poet.

During the same year, Hughes won an open exhibition in English at Pembroke College, Cambridge, but chose to do his national service first. His two years of national service (1949–1951) passed comparatively easily. Hughes was stationed as a ground wireless mechanic in the RAF on an isolated three-man station in east Yorkshire. During this time, he had little to do but "read and reread Shakespeare and watch the grass grow". He learnt many of the plays by heart and memorised great quantities of W. B. Yeats's poetry.

=== Career ===
In 1951 Hughes initially studied English at Pembroke College under M. J. C. Hodgart, an authority on balladic forms. Hughes felt encouraged and supported by Hodgart's supervision, but attended few lectures and wrote no more poetry at this time, feeling stifled by literary academia and the "terrible, suffocating, maternal octopus" of literary tradition. He wrote, "I might say, that I had as much talent for Leavis-style dismantling of texts as anyone else, I even had a special bent for it, nearly a sadistic streak there, but it seemed to me not only a foolish game, but deeply destructive of myself." In his third year, he transferred to Anthropology and Archaeology, both of which would later inform his poetry. He did not excel as a scholar, receiving only a third-class grade in Part I of the Anthropology and Archaeology Tripos in 1954.

His first published poetry appeared in Chequer. A poem, "The little boys and the seasons", written during this time, was published in Granta, under the pseudonym Daniel Hearing.

After university, living in London and Cambridge, Hughes had many varied jobs including working as a rose gardener, a nightwatchman, and a reader for the British film company J. Arthur Rank. He worked at London Zoo as a washer-upper, a post that offered plentiful opportunities to observe animals at close quarters.

On 25 February 1956, Hughes and his friends held a party to launch St. Botolph's Review, which had a single issue. In it, Hughes had four poems. At the party, he met American poet Sylvia Plath, who was studying at Cambridge on a Fulbright Scholarship. She had already published extensively, won multiple awards, and came to the party specifically to meet Hughes and his fellow poet Lucas Myers. Hughes and Plath felt a great mutual attraction, but they did not meet again for another month, when Plath passed through London on her way to Paris. She visited him again on her return three weeks later.

Cold, delicately as the dark snow,
A fox's nose touches twig, leaf;
Two eyes serve a movement, that now
And again now, and now, and now

Sets neat prints into the snow
Between trees, and warily a lame
Shadow lags by stump and in hollow
Of a body that is bold to come

Across clearings, an eye,
A widening deepening greenness,
Brilliantly, concentratedly,
Coming about its own business

Till, with a sudden sharp hot stink of fox
It enters the dark hole of the head.
The window is starless still; the clock ticks,
The page is printed.

— The last four stanzas of "The Thought Fox"
from The Hawk in the Rain, 1957

Hughes and Plath were married on 16 June 1956, at St George the Martyr, Holborn, four months after they had first met. They chose the date, Bloomsday, in honour of Irish writer James Joyce. Plath's mother was the only wedding guest. The couple spent most of their honeymoon at Benidorm, in Alicante on Spain's Costa Blanca.

Hughes's biographers note that Plath did not tell him about her history of depression and suicide attempts until much later. Reflecting later in Birthday Letters, Hughes commented that early on he could see chasms of difference between himself and Plath, but that in the first years of their marriage they both felt happy and supported, avidly pursuing their writing careers.

On returning to Cambridge, they lived at 55 Eltisley Avenue. That year they each had poems published in The Nation, Poetry, and The Atlantic. Plath typed up Hughes's manuscript for his collection Hawk in the Rain, which won a competition run by the Poetry centre of the Young Men's and Young Women's Hebrew Association of New York. The first prize was publication by Harper. Hughes gained widespread critical acclaim after the book's release in September 1957, including a Somerset Maugham Award. The work favoured hard-hitting trochees and spondees reminiscent of Middle English — a style he used throughout his career — over the more genteel latinate sounds.

The couple moved to the United States in 1957 so that Plath could take a teaching position at her alma mater, Smith College. During this time, Hughes taught at the University of Massachusetts, Amherst. In 1958, they met artist Leonard Baskin, who would later illustrate many of Hughes's books, including Crow.

The couple returned to England in 1959, staying for a short while back in Heptonstall and then finding a small flat in Primrose Hill, London. They were both writing: Hughes was working on programmes for the BBC as well as producing essays, articles, reviews, and talks. During this time, he wrote the poems that would later be published in Recklings (1966) and Wodwo (1967).

In March 1960, his book Lupercal was published, and it won the Hawthornden Prize. He found he was being labelled as the poet of the wild, writing only about animals. Hughes began to seriously explore myth and esoteric practices including shamanism, alchemy and Buddhism, with The Tibetan Book of the Dead being a particular focus in the early 1960s. He believed that imagination could heal dualistic splits in the human psyche, and poetry was the language of that work.

Hughes and Plath had two children, Frieda Hughes (b. 1960) and Nicholas Hughes (1962–2009). In 1961, they bought the house Court Green, in North Tawton, Devon.

In the summer of 1962, Hughes began an affair with Assia Wevill, who had been subletting the Primrose Hill flat with her husband. Under the cloud of his affair, Hughes and Plath separated in the autumn of 1962. Plath moved back to London and set up life in a new flat with the children.

In 1966, after Plath's death, he wrote poems to accompany Leonard Baskin's illustrations of crows, which became the epic narrative The Life and Songs of the Crow, one of the works for which Hughes is best known. Hughes did not finish the Crow sequence until after his work Cave Birds was published in 1975. In 1967, while living with Wevill, Hughes produced two sculptures of a jaguar, one of which he gave to his brother and one to his sister. Gerald Hughes' sculpture, branded with the letter 'A' on its forehead, was offered for sale in 2012.

=== Sylvia Plath's death ===
Plath died by suicide on 11 February 1963. As Plath's widower, Hughes became the executor of Plath's personal and literary estates. He oversaw the posthumous publication of her manuscripts, including Ariel (1965). Hughes was criticized for editing choices he made after Plath's death, like omitting the poem "The Jailer" and "The Rabbit Catcher" from Ariel. Some of the poems omitted include themes of domestic abuse and rape. In a 2004 edition of Ariel, twelve poems were added in, and Hughes wrote they were initially omitted because they were “personally aggressive.”

Hughes admitted to destroying the final volume of Plath's journal which detailed their last few months together. In his foreword to The Journals of Sylvia Plath (1982), he defended his actions as a consideration toward his young children. Feminists and fans of Sylvia Plath's work were upset and argued that he had essentially driven Plath to suicide and should not be responsible for her literary legacy.

Following her death, pro-Plath protestors repeatedly heckled Hughes and even threatened to kill Hughes in Plath's name. Those who were upset with Hughes attempted to chisel his last name off Plath's gravestone in Heptonstall, so only her maiden name would remain. In 1989, as Hughes was under public attack, a battle raged in the letters' pages of The Guardian and The Independent. In The Guardian on 20 April 1989, Hughes wrote the article "The Place Where Sylvia Plath Should Rest in Peace":

In the years soon after [Plath's] death, when scholars approached me, I tried to take their apparently serious concern for the truth about Sylvia Plath seriously. But I learned my lesson early... If I tried too hard to tell them exactly how something happened, in the hope of correcting some fantasy, I was quite likely to be accused of trying to suppress Free Speech. In general, my refusal to have anything to do with the Plath Fantasia has been regarded as an attempt to suppress Free Speech... The Fantasia about Sylvia Plath is more needed than the facts. Where that leaves respect for the truth of her life (and of mine), or for her memory, or for the literary tradition, I do not know.

Following Plath's suicide, Hughes wrote two poems expressing his grief, "The Howling of Wolves" and "Song of a Rat". He did not write poetry again for three years. He broadcast extensively, wrote critical essays, and became involved in running Poetry International with Patrick Garland and Charles Osborne, in the hopes of connecting English poetry with the rest of the world.

Six years after Plath's death, Hughes's long-term partner Assia Wevill killed herself and their four-year-old daughter, Alexandra Tatiana Elise ("Shura"), on 23 March 1969. Wevill and Hughes had begun their relationship while Hughes was still married to Plath, and Wevill subsequently lived with Hughes and his children. Their daughter Shura was born in 1965. Hughes later told Wevill's sister that he believed that if he had given Wevill more hope during their final telephone conversation, she would not have died.

=== 1970–1994 ===
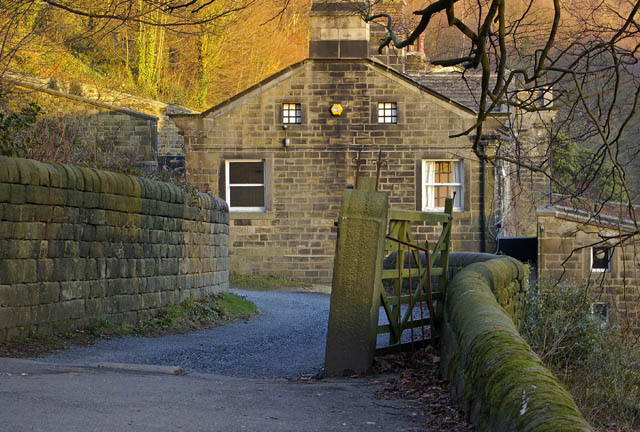
The Ted Hughes Arvon Centre, Lumb Bank – an 18th-century mill-owner's house, once Hughes's home

In August 1970, Hughes married a second time, to Carol Orchard, a nurse. They were together until his death.

Hughes bought a house known as Lumb Bank near Hebden Bridge, West Yorkshire, while still maintaining the property at Court Green. He also began cultivating a small farm near Winkleigh, Devon, called Moortown; he used this name as the title of one of his poetry collections. Later he served as the president of the charity Farms for City Children, established by his friend Michael Morpurgo in Iddesleigh.

In 1970 Hughes and his sister Olwyn set up the Rainbow Press. Between 1971 and 1981, it published sixteen titles, comprising poems by Sylvia Plath, Ted Hughes, Ruth Fainlight, Thom Gunn, and Seamus Heaney. The works were printed by Daedalus Press in Norfolk, Rampant Lions Press, and the John Roberts Press.

Hughes was appointed Poet Laureate in December 1984, following Sir John Betjeman. A collection of his animal poems for children had been published by Faber earlier that year, What is the Truth?, illustrated by R. J. Lloyd. For that work he won the annual Guardian Children's Fiction Prize, a once-in-a-lifetime book award.

Hughes wrote many works for children. He also collaborated closely with Peter Brook and the National Theatre Company. He dedicated himself to the Arvon Foundation, which promotes writing education and has run residential writing courses at Lumb Bank.

In 1993, Hughes made a rare television appearance for Channel 4, reading passages from his 1968 novel The Iron Man. He was featured in the 1994 documentary Seven Crows A Secret.

In early 1994, increasingly alarmed by the decline of fish in rivers local to his Devonshire home, Hughes became involved in conservation activism. He was one of the founding trustees of the Westcountry Rivers Trust, a charity established to restore rivers through catchment-scale management and a close relationship with local landowners and riparian owners.

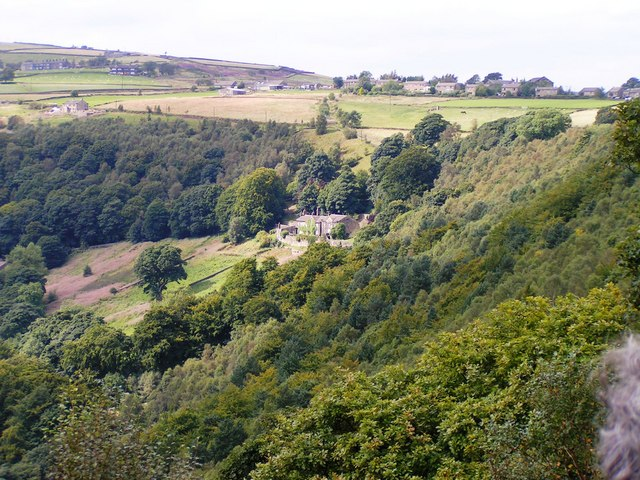
Lumb Bank in the Calder Valley

=== Death ===
In August 1998, Hughes was appointed a member of the Order of Merit by Queen Elizabeth II, filling the vacancy following the death of composer Michael Tippett. He continued to live at the house in Devon, until suffering a fatal heart attack on 28 October 1998 while undergoing hospital treatment for colon cancer in Southwark, London.

On 3 November 1998, his funeral was held at North Tawton church, and he was cremated in Exeter. Speaking at the funeral, fellow poet Seamus Heaney, said:

"No death outside my immediate family has left me feeling more bereft. No death in my lifetime has hurt poets more. He was a tower of tenderness and strength, a great arch under which the least of poetry's children could enter and feel secure. His creative powers were, as Shakespeare said, still crescent. By his death, the veil of poetry is rent and the walls of learning broken."

On 16 March 2009, Nicholas Hughes, the son of Hughes and Plath, died by suicide in his home in Alaska. He had suffered from depression.

In January 2013, Carol Hughes announced that she would write a memoir of their marriage. The Times headlined its story "Hughes's widow breaks silence to defend his name" and observed that "for more than 40 years she has kept her silence, never once joining in the furious debate that has raged around the late Poet Laureate since the suicide of his first wife, the poet Sylvia Plath."

Hughes's brother Gerald published a memoir late in 2014, Ted and I: A Brother's Memoir. Kirkus Reviews described it as "a warm recollection of a lauded poet".

== Work ==
Crow Blacker Than Ever

When God, disgusted with man,
Turned towards heaven,
And man, disgusted with God,
Turned towards Eve,
Things looked like falling apart.

But Crow Crow
Crow nailed them together,
Nailing heaven and earth together-

So man cried, but with God's voice.
And God bled, but with man's blood.

Then heaven and earth creaked at the joint
Which became gangrenous and stank-
A horror beyond redemption.
The agony did not diminish.
Man could not be man nor God God.

The agony
Grew.

Crow
Grinned

Crying: "This is my Creation,"

Flying the black flag of himself.

— Crow: From the Life and Songs of the Crow, 1970

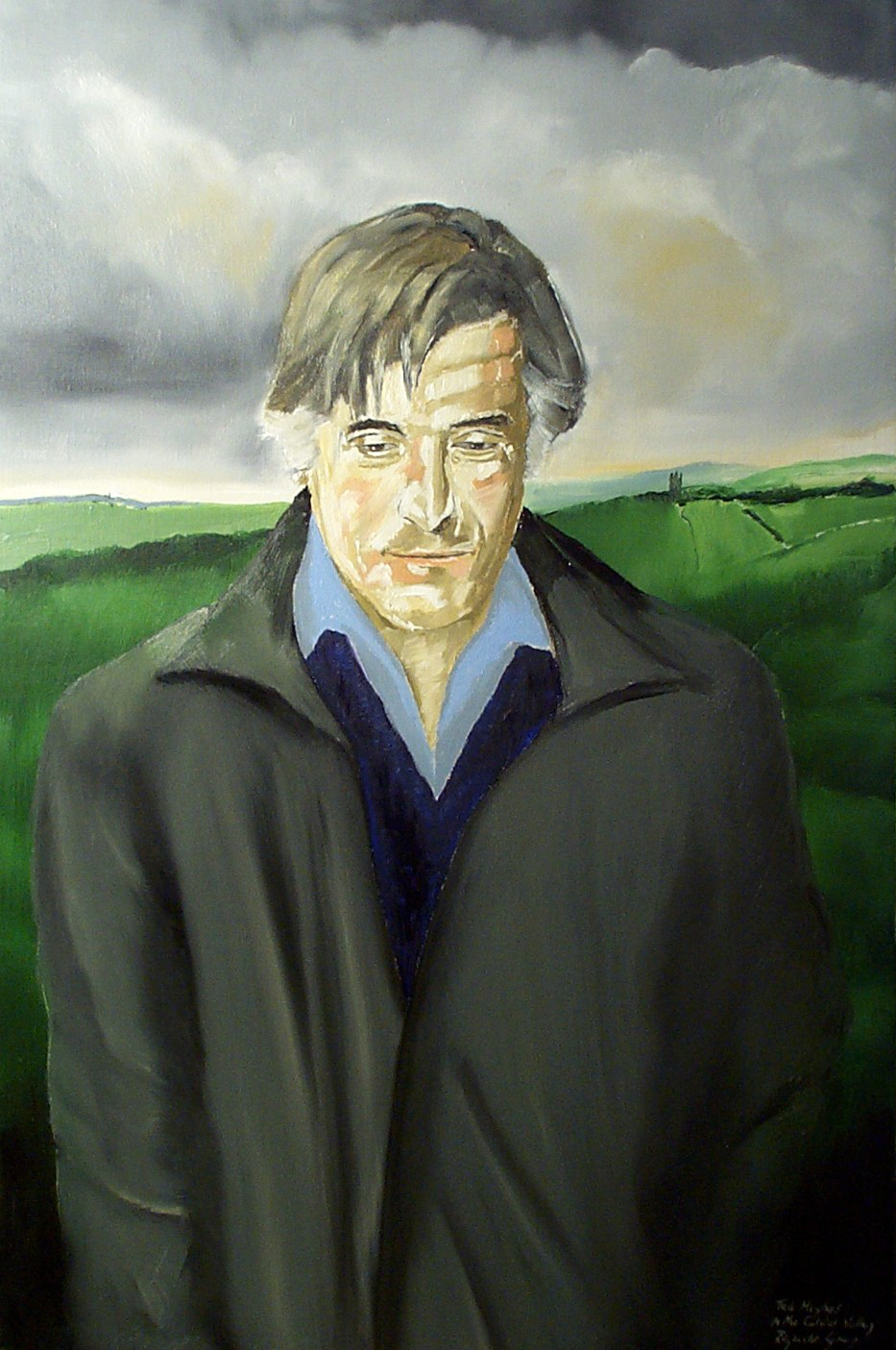
Homage to Ted Hughes by Reginald Gray (2004), Bankfield Museum, Halifax

Hughes's first collection, The Hawk in the Rain (1957), attracted considerable critical acclaim. In 1959 he won the Galbraith prize, which brought $5,000. His most significant work is perhaps Crow (1970), which whilst it has been widely praised also divided critics, combining an apocalyptic, bitter, cynical and surreal view of the universe with what sometimes appeared simple, childlike verse. Crow was edited several times across Hughes' career. Within its opus he created a cosmology of the totemic Crow who was simultaneously God, Nature and Hughes' alter ego. The publication of Crow shaped Hughes' poetic career as distinct from other forms of English Nature Poetry.

In a 1971 interview with The London Magazine, Hughes cited his main influences as including Blake, Donne, Hopkins, and Eliot. He mentioned also Schopenhauer, Robert Graves's book The White Goddess, and The Tibetan Book of the Dead.

Hughes worked for 10 years on a prose poem, "Gaudete", which he hoped to have made into a film. It tells the story of the vicar of an English village who is carried off by elemental spirits, and replaced in the village by his enantiodromic double, a changeling, fashioned from a log, who nevertheless has the same memories as the original vicar. The double is a force of nature who organises the women of the village into a "love coven" in order that he may father a new messiah. When the male members of the community discover what is going on, they murder him. The epilogue consists of a series of lyrics spoken by the restored priest in praise of a nature goddess, inspired by Robert Graves's White Goddess. It was printed in 1977. Hughes was very interested in the relationship between his poetry and the book arts, and many of his books were produced by notable presses and in collaborative editions with artists, for instance with Leonard Baskin.

In addition to his own poetry, Hughes wrote a number of translations of European plays, mainly classical ones. His Tales from Ovid (1997) contains a selection of free verse translations from Ovid's Metamorphoses. He also wrote both poetry and prose for children, one of his most successful books being The Iron Man, written to comfort his children after their mother Sylvia Plath's suicide. It later became the basis of Pete Townshend's 1989 rock musical of the same name, and of the 1999 animated film The Iron Giant, the latter of which is dedicated to his memory.

Hughes was appointed Poet Laureate in 1984 following the death of John Betjeman. It was later known that Hughes was second choice for the appointment. Philip Larkin, the preferred nominee, had declined, because of ill health and a loss of creative momentum, dying a year later. Hughes served in this position until his death in 1998. In 1992 Hughes published Shakespeare and the Goddess of Complete Being, a monumental work inspired by Graves's The White Goddess. The book, considered Hughes's key work of prose, had a mixed reception "divided between those who considered it an important and original appreciation of Shakespeare's complete works, whilst others dismissed it as a lengthy and idiosyncratic appreciation of Shakespeare refracted by Hughes's personal belief system". Hughes himself later suggested that the time spent writing prose was directly responsible for a decline in his health. Also in 1992, Hughes published Rain Charm for the Duchy, collecting together for the first time his Laureate works, including poems celebrating important royal occasions. The book also contained a section of notes throwing light on the context and genesis of each poem.

In 1998, his Tales from Ovid won the Whitbread Book of the Year Award. In Birthday Letters, his last collection, Hughes broke his silence on Plath, detailing aspects of their life together and his own behaviour at the time. The book, the cover artwork for which was by their daughter Frieda, won the 1999 Whitbread Prize for poetry.

Hughes's definitive 1,333-page Collected Poems (Faber & Faber) appeared (posthumously) in 2003. A poem discovered in October 2010, "Last letter", describes what happened during the three days leading up to Plath's suicide. It was published in New Statesman on National Poetry Day, October 2010. Poet Laureate Carol Ann Duffy told Channel 4 News that the poem was "the darkest poem he has ever written" and said that for her it was "almost unbearable to read".

In 2011, several previously unpublished letters from Hughes to Craig Raine were published in the literary review Areté. They relate mainly to the process of editing Shakespeare and the Goddess of Complete Being, and also contain a sequence of drafts of letters in which Raine attempts to explain to Hughes his disinclination to publish Hughes's poem The Cast in an anthology he was editing, on the grounds that it might open Hughes to further attack on the subject of Sylvia Plath. "Dear Ted, Thanks for the poem. It is very interesting and would cause a minor sensation" (4 April 1997). The poem was eventually published in Birthday Letters and Hughes makes a passing reference to this then unpublished collection: "I have a whole pile of pieces that are all – one way or another – little bombs for the studious and earnest to throw at me" (5 April 1997).

=== Themes ===
This house has been far out at sea all night,
The woods crashing through darkness, the booming hills,
Winds stampeding the fields under the window
Floundering black astride and blinding wet

Till day rose; then under an orange sky
The hills had new places, and wind wielded
Blade-light, luminous black and emerald,
Flexing like the lens of a mad eye.

— From "Wind"
The Hawk in the Rain, 1957

Hughes's earlier poetic work is rooted in nature and, in particular, the innocent savagery of animals, an interest from an early age. He wrote frequently of the mixture of beauty and violence in the natural world. Animals serve as a metaphor for his view on life: animals live out a struggle for the survival of the fittest in the same way that humans strive for ascendancy and success. Examples can be seen in the poems "Hawk Roosting" and "Jaguar".

The West Riding dialect of Hughes's childhood remained a staple of his poetry, his lexicon lending a texture that is concrete, terse, emphatic, economical yet powerful. The manner of speech renders the hard facts of things and wards off self-indulgence.

Hughes's later work is deeply reliant upon myth and the British bardic tradition, heavily inflected with a modernist, Jungian, and ecological viewpoint. He re-worked classical and archetypal myth working with a conception of the dark sub-conscious.

=== Translation ===
In 1965, he founded with Daniel Weissbort the journal Modern Poetry in Translation, which involved bringing to the attention of the West the work of Czesław Miłosz, who would later go on to win the Nobel Prize in Literature. Weissbort and Hughes were instrumental in bringing to the English-speaking world the work of many poets who were hardly known, from such countries as Poland and Hungary, then controlled by the Soviet Union. Hughes wrote an introduction to a translation of Vasko Popa: Collected Poems, in the "Persea Series of Poetry in Translation", edited by Weissbort. which was reviewed with favour by premiere literary critic John Bayley of Oxford University in The New York Review of Books.

== Commemoration and legacy ==
A memorial walk was inaugurated in 2005, leading from the Devon village of Belstone to Hughes's memorial stone above the River Taw, on Dartmoor, and in 2006 a Ted Hughes poetry trail was built at Stover Country Park, also in Devon. In 2008 The Times ranked Hughes fourth on its list of "The 50 greatest British writers since 1945".

On 28 April 2011, a memorial plaque for Hughes was unveiled at North Tawton by his widow Carol Hughes. At Lumb Bridge near Pecket Well, Calderdale is a plaque, installed by The Elmet Trust, commemorating Hughes's poem "Six Young Men", which was inspired by an old photograph of six young men taken at that spot. The photograph, taken just before the First World War, was of six young men who were all soon to lose their lives in the war. A Ted Hughes Festival is held each year in Mytholmroyd, led by the Elmet Trust, an educational body founded to support the work and legacy of Hughes.

In 2010, it was announced that Hughes would be commemorated with a memorial in Poets' Corner in Westminster Abbey. On 6 December 2011, a slab of Kirkstone green slate was ceremonially placed at the foot of the memorial commemorating T. S. Eliot. Poet Seamus Heaney and actress Juliet Stevenson gave readings at the ceremony, which was also attended by Hughes's widow Carol and daughter Frieda, and by the poets Simon Armitage, Blake Morrison, Andrew Motion and Michael Morpurgo. Motion paid tribute to Hughes as "one of the two great poets of the last half of the last century" (the other being Philip Larkin). Hughes's memorial stone bears lines from "That Morning", a poem recollecting the epiphany of a huge shoal of salmon flashing by as he and his son Nicholas waded a stream in Alaska: "So we found the end of our journey / So we stood alive in the river of light / Among the creatures of light, creatures of light."

In October 2015, the BBC Two major documentary Ted Hughes: Stronger Than Death examined Hughes's life and work. The programme included contributions from poets Simon Armitage and Ruth Fainlight, broadcaster Melvyn Bragg, biographers Elaine Feinstein and Jonathan Bate, activist Robin Morgan, critic Al Alvarez, publicist Jill Barber, friend Ehor Boyanowsky, patron Elizabeth Sigmund, friend Daniel Huws, Hughes's US editor Frances McCullough, and younger cousin Vicky Watling. His daughter Frieda spoke for the first time about her father and mother.

=== Archive ===
Hughes archival material is held by institutions such as Emory University and Exeter University. In 2008, the British Library acquired a large collection comprising over 220 files containing manuscripts, letters, journals, personal diaries, and correspondence. The library archive is accessible through the British Library website. There is also a Collection Guide available grouping together all of the Hughes material at the British Library with links to material held by other institutions. Inspired by Hughes's Crow the German painter Johannes Heisig created a large painting series in black and white which was presented to the public for the first time on the occasion of Berlin Museum Long Night in August 2011 at the SEZ Berlin.

=== Ted Hughes Award ===
In 2009, the Ted Hughes Award for new work in poetry was established with the permission of Carol Hughes. The Poetry Society notes "the award is named in honour of Ted Hughes, Poet Laureate, and one of the greatest twentieth century poets for both children and adults". Members of the Poetry Society and Poetry Book Society recommend a living UK poet who has completed the newest and most innovative work that year, "highlighting outstanding contributions made by poets to our cultural life". The £5,000 prize was previously funded from the annual honorarium that former Poet Laureate Carol Ann Duffy received as Laureate from The Queen.

=== Ted Hughes Society ===
The Ted Hughes Society, founded in 2010, publishes a peer-reviewed on-line journal, which can be downloaded by members. Its website also publishes news, and has articles on all Hughes's major works for free access. The Society staged Hughes conferences in 2010 and 2012 at Pembroke College, Cambridge, and will continue to stage conferences elsewhere.

=== Ted Hughes Paper Trail ===
On 16 November 2013, Hughes's former hometown of Mexborough held a special performance trail, as part of its "Right Up Our Street" project, celebrating the writer's connection with the town. The free event included a two-hour ramble through Mexborough following the route of young Hughes's paper round. Participants visited some of the important locations which influenced the poet, with the trail beginning at Hughes's former home, which is now a furniture shop.

=== Elmet Trust ===
The Elmet Trust, founded in 2006, celebrates the life and work of Ted Hughes. The Trust looks after Hughes's birthplace in Mytholmroyd, which is available as a holiday let and writer's retreat. The Trust also runs Hughes-related events, including an annual Ted Hughes Festival.

== In other media ==
- Hughes's 1983 River anthology was the inspiration for the 2000 River cello concerto by British composer Sally Beamish.
- Selected stories from Hughes' How the Whale Became and The Dreamfighter were adapted into a family opera by composer Julian Philips and writer Edward Kemp, entitled How the Whale Became. Commissioned by the Royal Opera House, the opera was premiered in December 2013.
- Hughes was portrayed by Daniel Craig in the 2003 film Sylvia.

== Selected works ==
=== Poetry collections ===
- 1957 The Hawk in the Rain
- 1960 Lupercal
- 1967 Wodwo
- 1970 Crow: From the Life and the Songs of the Crow
- 1972 Selected Poems 1957–1967
- 1975 Cave Birds
- 1977 Gaudete
- 1979 Remains of Elmet (with photographs by Fay Godwin)
- 1979 Moortown
- 1981 Under the North Star (drawings by Leonard Baskin, includes the poem “The Musk-Ox”)
- 1983 River
- 1986 Flowers and Insects
- 1989 Wolfwatching
- 1992 Rain-charm for the Duchy
- 1994 New Selected Poems 1957–1994
- 1997 Tales from Ovid
- 1998 Birthday Letters—winner of the 1998 Forward Poetry Prize for best collection, the 1998 T. S. Eliot Prize, and the 1999 British Book of the Year award.
- 2003 Collected Poems
- 2016 A Ted Hughes Bestiary: Poems

=== Volumes of translation ===
- Spring Awakening by Frank Wedekind
- Blood Wedding by Federico García Lorca
- 1968 Yehuda Amichai, Selected Poems by Yehuda Amichai, Cape Goliard Press (London, England), revised edition published as Poems, Harper (New York, NY), 1969.
- 1977 Amen by Yehuda Amichai, Amen, Harper (New York, NY)
- 1989 The Desert of Love: Selected Poems by János Pilinszky, Anvil Press Poetry (Greenwich, UK)
- 1997 Tales from Ovid by Ovid Farrar, Straus, and Giroux (New York, NY)
- 1999 The Oresteia by Aeschylus, Farrar, Straus, and Giroux (New York, NY)
- 1999 Phèdre by Jean Racine, Farrar, Straus, and Giroux (New York, NY)
- 1999 Alcestis by Euripides, Farrar, Straus, and Giroux (New York, NY)

=== Anthologies edited by Hughes ===
- Selected Poems of Emily Dickinson. Faber and Faber. 2004. ISBN 978-0-57-122343-5.
- Selected Poems of Sylvia Plath. Faber and Faber. 2003. ISBN 978-0-57-113586-8.
- A Choice of Shakespeare's Verse. Faber and Faber. 2000. ISBN 978-0-57-123379-3.
- A Choice of Coleridge's Verse. Faber and Faber. 1996. ISBN 978-0-57-117604-5.
- With Seamus Heaney, ed. (1982). The Rattle Bag. Faber and Faber. ISBN 978-0-57-111976-9.
- With Seamus Heaney, ed. (1997). The School Bag. Faber and Faber. ISBN 978-0-57-117750-9.
- By Heart: 101 Poems to Remember. Faber and Faber. 1997. ISBN 978-0-57-119263-2.
- 1965: Modern Poetry in Translation (literary magazine)
- Here Today (anthology for children). Hutchinson. 1963.

=== Short story collection ===
- 1995 The Dreamfighter, and Other Creation Tales, Faber and Faber, London, England.
- 1995 Difficulties of a Bridegroom: Collected Short Stories, Picador, New York, NY.

=== Prose ===
- 1967 Poetry Is, Doubleday, New York.
- 1967 Poetry in the Making: An Anthology of Poems and Programmes from "Listening and Writing", Faber and Faber, London.
- 1992, revised and corrected 1993 Shakespeare and the Goddess of Complete Being, Farrar, Straus and Giroux, New York.
- 1993 A Dancer to God: Tributes to T. S. Eliot. (Ed) Farrar, Straus, and Giroux, New York.
- 1994 Winter Pollen: Occasional Prose, (essay collection) Edited by William Scammell, Faber and Faber (London), Picador USA (New York) 1995.

=== Books for children ===
- 1961 Meet my Folks! (illustrated by George Adamson)
- 1963 How the Whale Became (illustrated by George Adamson)
- 1963 The Earth-Owl and Other Moon-People (illustrated by R.A. Brandt)
- 1964 Nessie the Mannerless Monster (illustrated by Gerald Rose)
- 1967 Poetry in the Making
- 1968 The Iron Man (first illustrated by George Adamson, in 1985 by Andrew Davidson and in 2019 by Chris Mould)
- 1970 Coming of the Kings and Other Plays
- 1976 Season Songs (illustrated by Leonard Baskin)
- 1976 Moon-Whales and Other Moon Poems (illustrated by Leonard Baskin)
- 1978 Moon-Bells and Other Poems (illustrated by Felicity Roma Bowers)
- 1981 Under the North Star (illustrated by Leonard Baskin, includes the poem “The Musk-Ox”)
- 1984 What Is the Truth? (illustrated by R. J. Lloyd), for which Hughes won the Guardian Prize
- 1986 Ffangs the Vampire Bat and the Kiss of Truth (illustrated by Chris Riddell)
- 1987 The Cat and the Cuckoo (illustrated by R. J. Lloyd)
- 1988 Tales of the Early World (illustrated by Andrew Davidson)
- 1993 The Iron Woman (illustrated by Andrew Davidson)
- 1993 The Mermaid's Purse (illustrated by R. J. Lloyd, Sunstone Press)
- 1995 Collected Animal Poems: Vols. 1–4, Faber & Faber
- 2002 The Cat and the Cuckoo, new edition illustrated by Flora McDonnell, Faber & Faber

=== Plays ===
- The House of Aries (radio play), broadcast, 1960.
- The Calm produced in Boston, 1961.
- A Houseful of Women (radio play), broadcast, 1961.
- The Wound (radio play), broadcast, 1962.
- Difficulties of a Bridegroom (radio play), broadcast, 1963.
- Epithalamium produced in London, 1963.
- Dogs (radio play), broadcast, 1964.
- The House of Donkeys (radio play), broadcast, 1965.
- The Head of Gold (radio play), broadcast, 1967.
- The Coming of the Kings and Other Plays (based on juvenile work).
- The Price of a Bride (juvenile, radio play), broadcast, 1966.
- Adapted Seneca's Oedipus, produced in London, 1968).
- Orghast (with Peter Brook), produced in Persepolis, Iran, 1971.
- Eat Crow, Rainbow Press, London, England, 1971.
- The Iron Man, juvenile, televised, 1972.
- Orpheus, 1973.

=== Limited editions ===
- The Burning of the Brothel (Turret Books, 1966)
- Recklings (Turret Books, 1967)
- Scapegoats and Rabies (Poet & Printer, 1967)
- Animal Poems (Richard Gilbertson, 1967)
- A Crow Hymn (Sceptre Press, 1970)
- The Martyrdom of Bishop Farrar (Richard Gilbertson, 1970)
- Crow Wakes (Poet & Printer, 1971)
- Shakespeare's Poem (Lexham Press, 1971)
- Eat Crow (Rainbow Press, 1971)
- Prometheus on His Crag (Rainbow Press, 1973)
- Crow: From the Life and the Songs of the Crow (Illustrated by Leonard Baskin, published by Faber & Faber, 1973)
- Spring, Summer, Autumn, Winter (Rainbow Press,1974)
- Cave Birds (illustrated by Leonard Baskin, published by Scolar Press, 1975)
- Earth-Moon (illustrated by Ted Hughes, published by Rainbow Press, 1976)
- Eclipse (Sceptre Press, 1976)
- Sunstruck (Sceptre Press, 1977)
- A Solstice (Sceptre Press, 1978)
- Orts (Rainbow Press, 1978)
- Moortown Elegies (Rainbow Press, 1978)
- The Threshold (illustrated by Ralph Steadman, published by Steam Press, 1979)
- Adam and the Sacred Nine (Rainbow Press, 1979)
- Four Tales Told by an Idiot (Sceptre Press, 1979)
- The Cat and the Cuckoo (illustrated by R.J. Lloyd, published by Sunstone Press, 1987)
- A Primer of Birds: Poems (illustrated by Leonard Baskin, published by Gehenna Press, 1989)
- Capriccio (illustrated by Leonard Baskin, published by Gehenna Press, 1990)
- The Mermaid's Purse (illustrated by R.J. Lloyd, published by Sunstone Press, 1993)
- Howls and Whispers (illustrated by Leonard Baskin, published by Gehenna Press, 1998)

Many of Ted Hughes's poems have been published as limited-edition broadsides.
