= 2014 Nobel Prize in Literature =

- Patrick Modiano
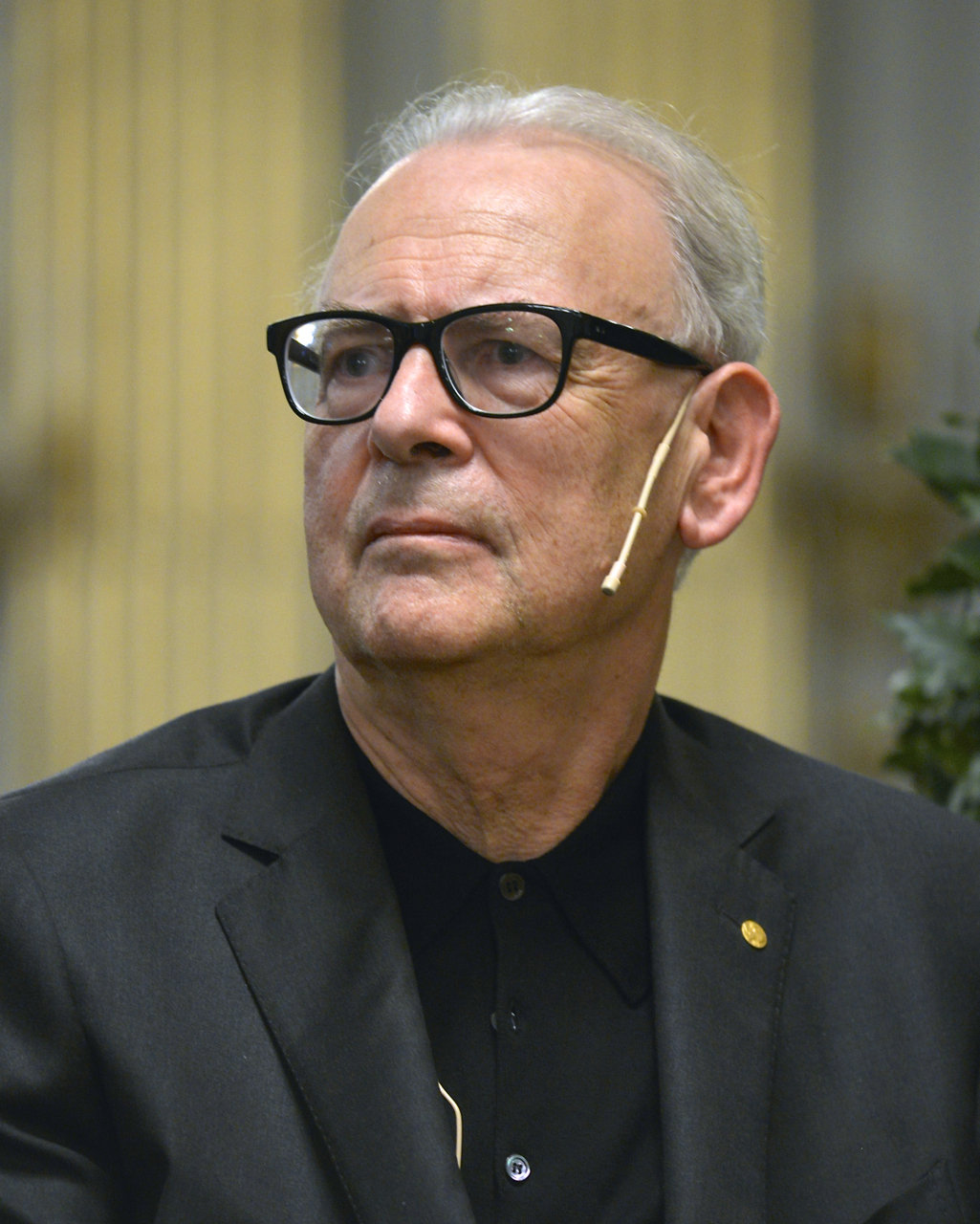
- "for the art of memory with which he has evoked the most ungraspable human destinies and uncovered the life-world of the occupation"
- Date: 9 October 2014 (announcement); 10 December 2014 (ceremony)
- Location: Stockholm, Sweden
- Presented by: Swedish Academy
- First award: 1901
- Website: Official website

The 2014 Nobel Prize in Literature was awarded to the French novelist Patrick Modiano (born 1945) "for the art of memory with which he has evoked the most ungraspable human destinies and uncovered the life-world of the occupation". He became the 15th Frenchman to receive the Nobel Prize for Literature after J. M. G. Le Clézio in 2008.

== Laureate ==
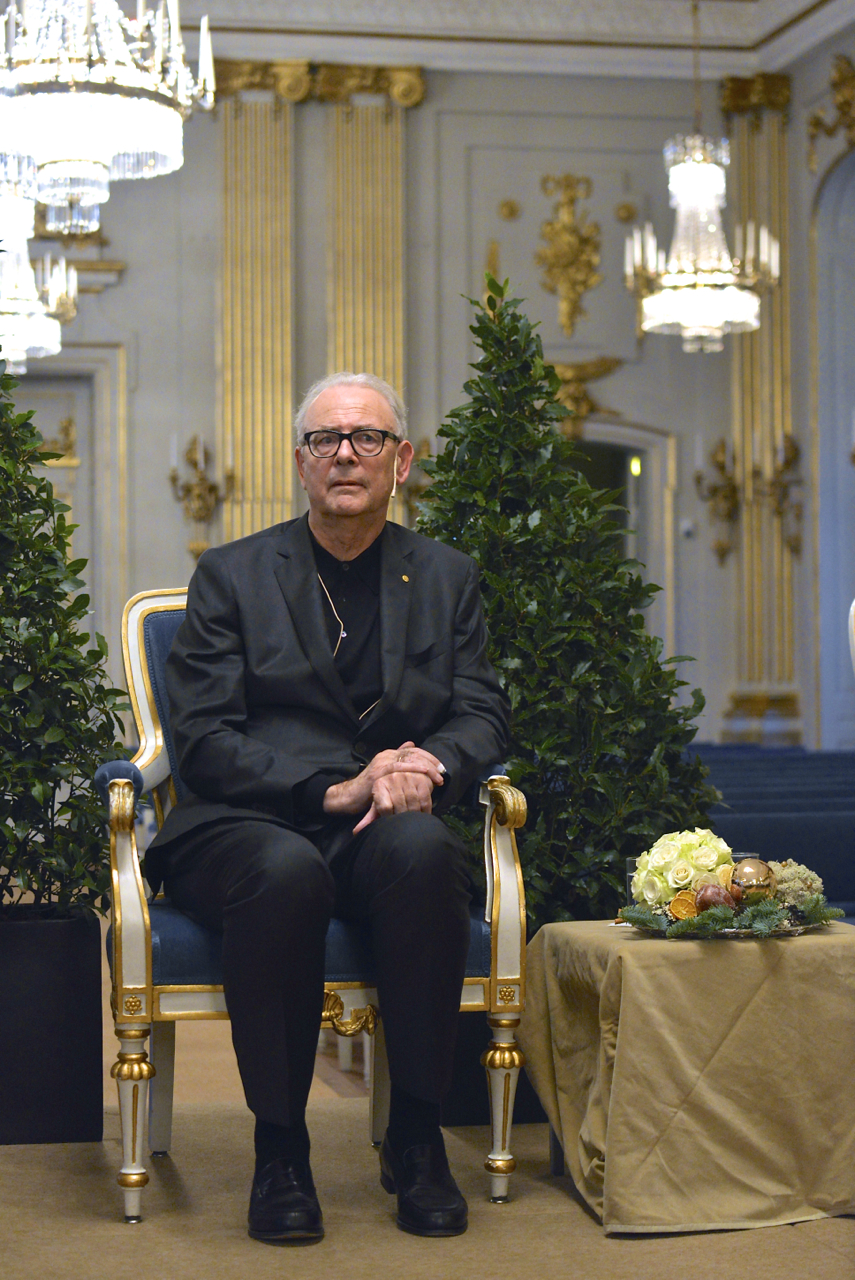
Patrick Modiano at the press conference in Stockholm, 6 December 2014.

Patrick Modiano's stories are often characterized by their exploration of universal but difficult questions, at the same time as they are grounded in everyday settings and historical events like in La Place de l'Étoile ("The Place of the Star", 1968). His works center around subjects like memory, oblivion, identity, and guilt as in Rue des Boutiques Obscures ("Missing Person", 1978) and Dora Bruder (1997). The city of Paris plays a central role in his writing – Accident nocturne ("Paris Nocturne", 2003), and his stories are often based on events that occurred during the German occupation of France during World War II. At times, Modiano's stories are based on his own experience or on interviews, newspaper articles, or his own notes. Among his other famous literary works include Un cirque passe ("After the Circus", 1992), Quartier Perdu ("A Trace of Malice", 1984), and L'Herbe des nuits ("The Black Notebook", 2012).

== Candidates ==
For 2014, The Nobel committee of the Swedish Academy received 210 nominations, 36 of which were nominated for the first time. Ladbrokes favourites to win the prize were Kenyan writer Ngũgĩ wa Thiong'o, Japanese novelist Haruki Murakami and Belarusian journalist Svetlana Alexievich (awarded in 2015). Jointly with Syrian poet Adonis, Patrick Modiano was the fourth betting favourite. Other top favourites included American Philip Roth, Austrian Peter Handke (awarded in 2019) and Norwegian Jon Fosse (awarded in 2023).

== Reactions ==
Called "a Marcel Proust of our time", Modiano heard the news via a mobile phone call from his daughter while walking through Paris, "just next to the Jardin du Luxembourg" where he lives. The win was unexpected, even to those in the Anglo-American world most familiar with his work. The puzzlement was likely related to limited knowledge of Modiano in the English-speaking world; despite his prolific output, fewer than a dozen of his works had been translated into English, and several of those were out of print before the academy's announcement. The award-winning Missing Person had sold just 2,425 copies in the US prior to the Nobel. Even Peter Englund, the permanent secretary of the Swedish Academy, noted that many people outside France would likely be unfamiliar with Modiano and his work. "He is well-known in France, but not anywhere else," he said in a post-announcement interview. Yale University Press quickly published three of his novels in English.

== Nobel lecture ==
Patrick Modiano delivered his Nobel lecture on 7 December 2014 at the Swedish Academy. In it he spoke about his own writing and influential literature of the past. Modiano expressed concernes about the future of literature in a present day world of internet, mobile phones and social media, but concluded "I will remain optimistic about the future of literature and I am convinced that the writers of the future will safeguard the succession just as every generation has done since Homer..."

== Award ceremony ==
At the award ceremony in Stockholm on 10 December 2014, Jesper Svenbro of the Swedish Academy said:

In novel upon novel Modiano has developed his ability to use almost non-existent documentation – old telephone numbers, street addresses – to endow the past with entrancing life and his Parisian cityscape with a singular voice. Magnificently, his work instantiates what an earlier Nobel Laureate, Seamus Heaney, called “the poetry of place”.

== Gallery ==
- 6 December 2014: Patrick Modiano during the Swedish Academy's press conference with Peter Englund.
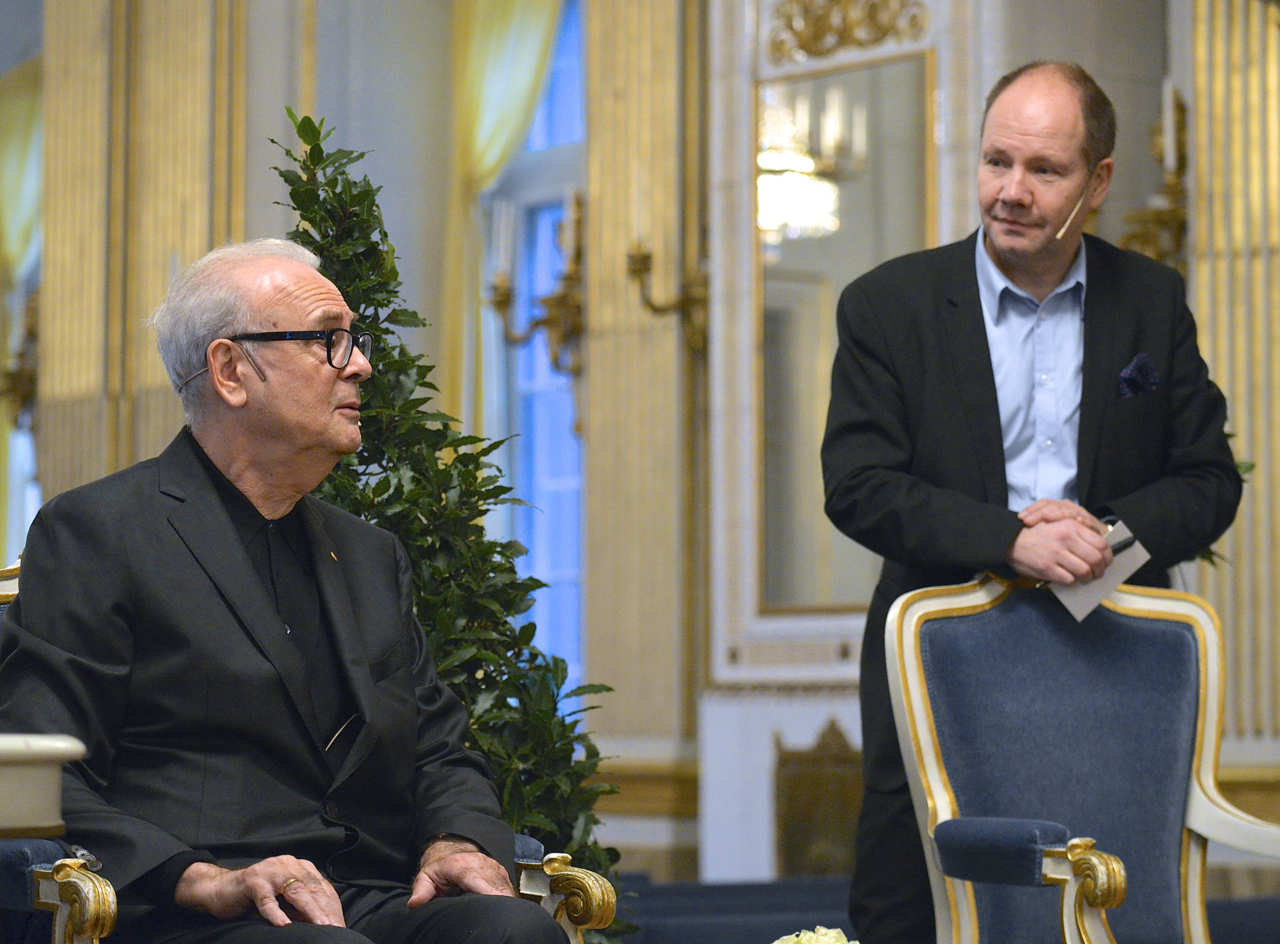

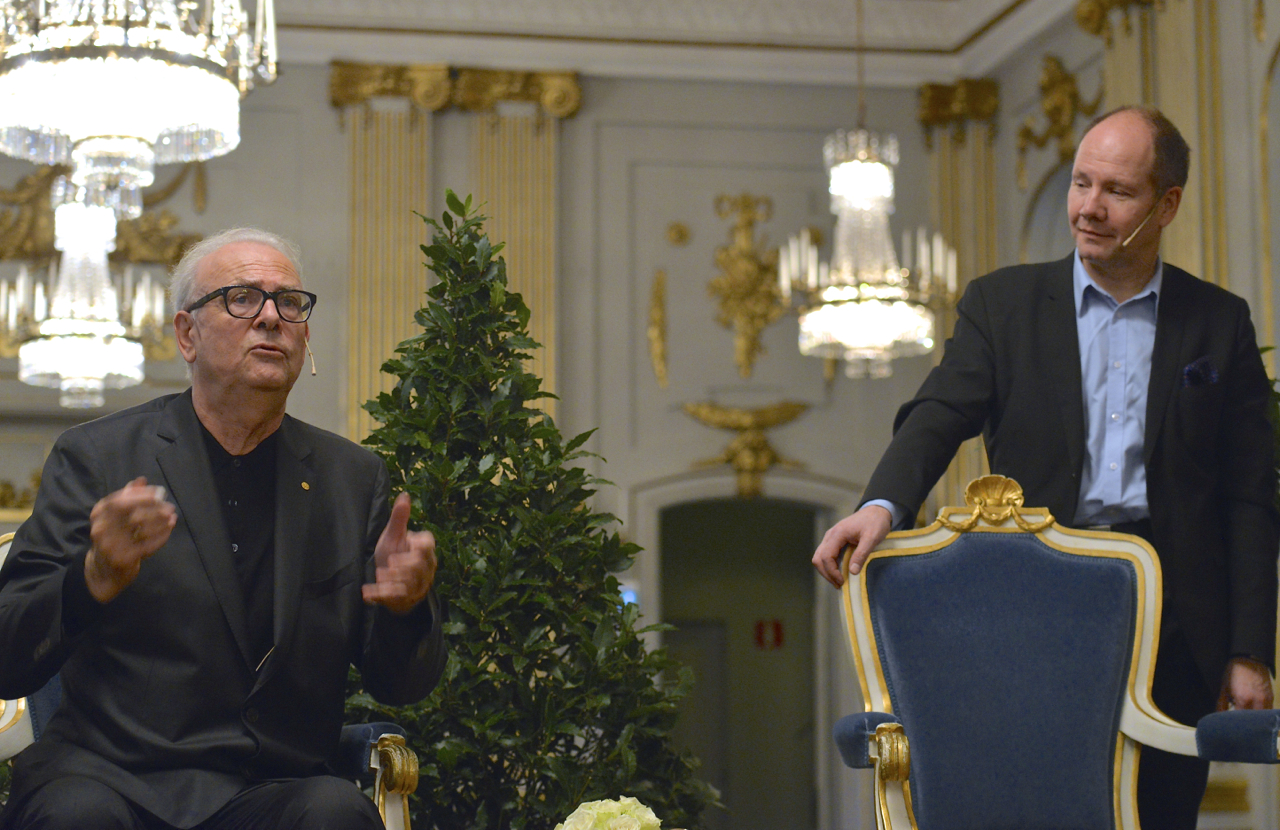

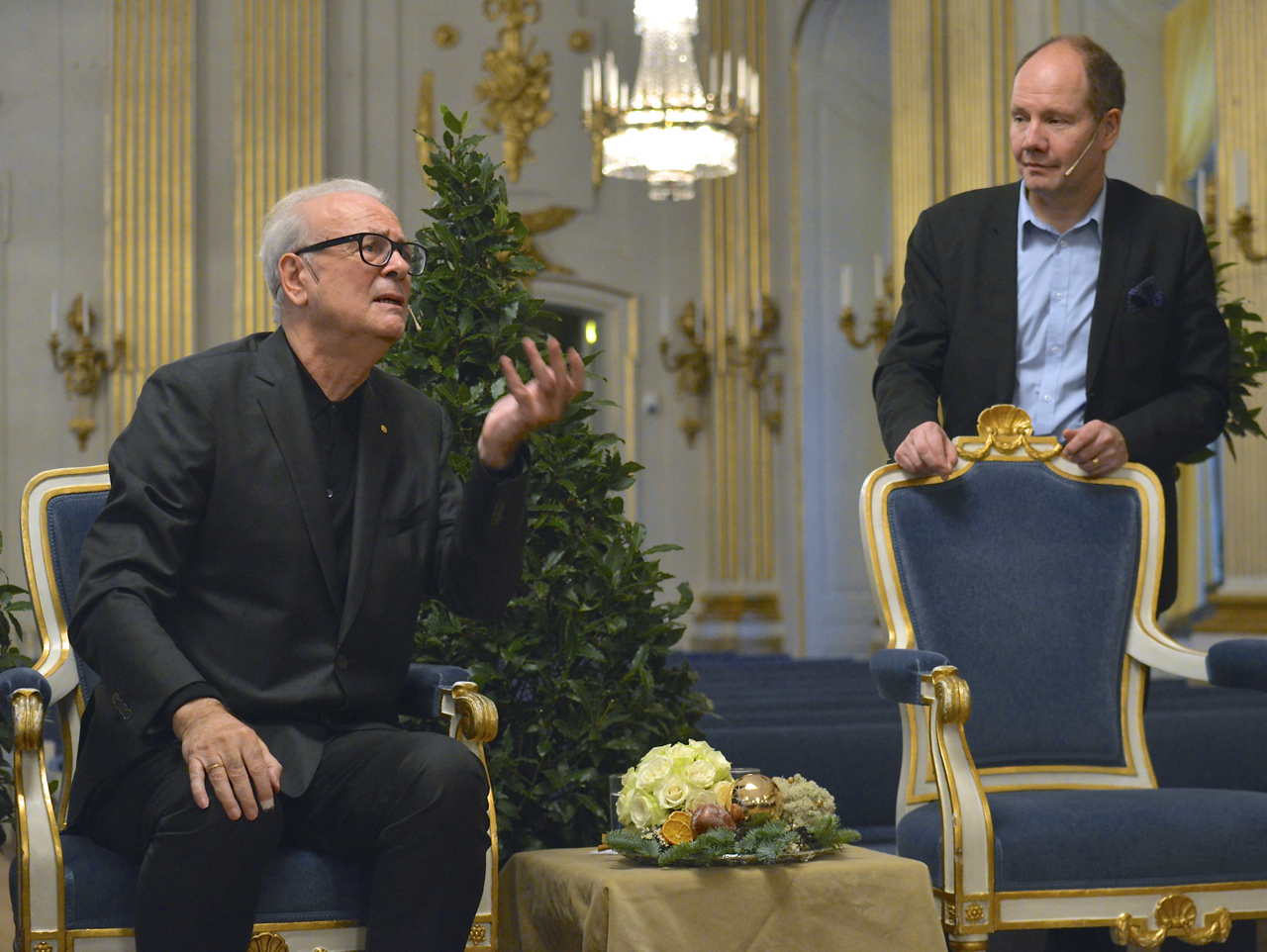

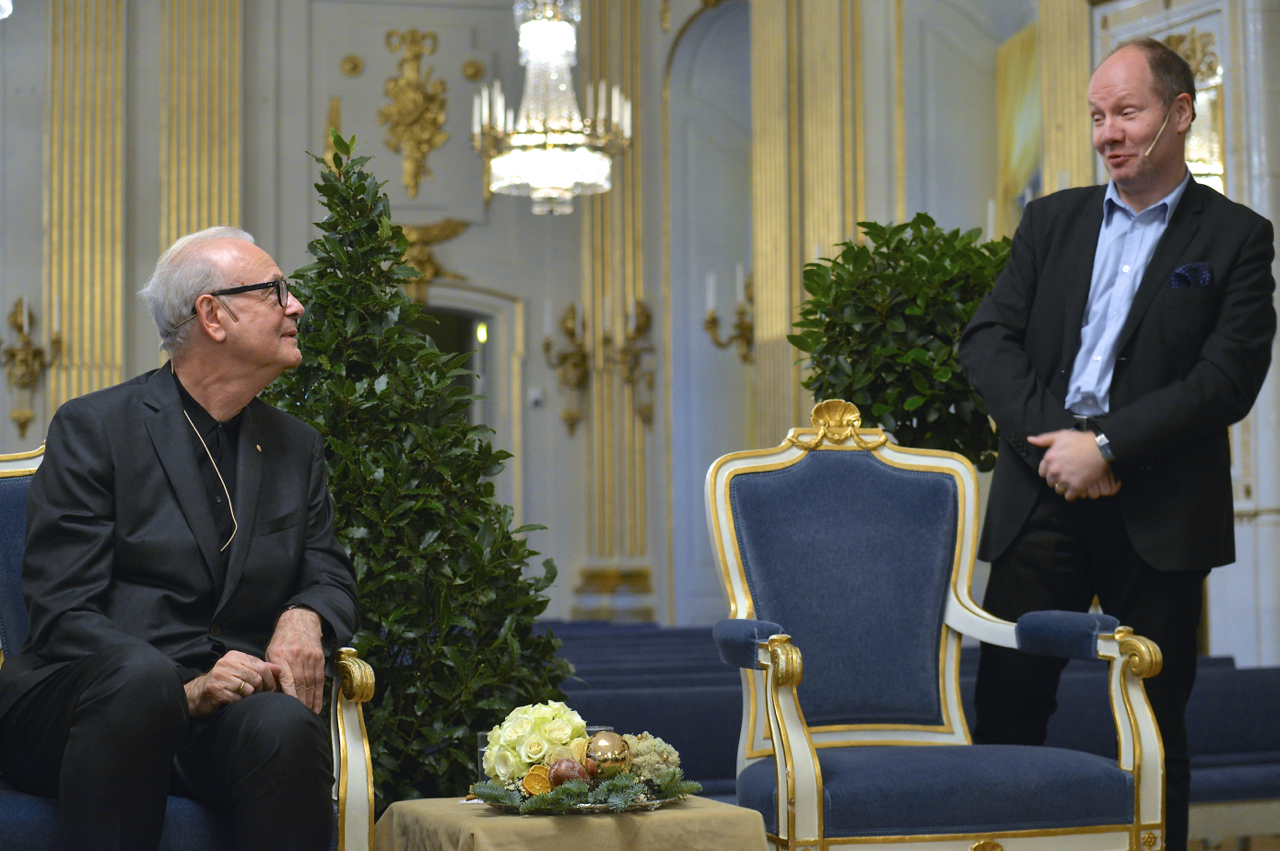
