= St. Botolph's Review =

St Botolph's Review was the student-made poetry journal from Cambridge University, England in 1956, which saw the first publication of Ted Hughes' poetry, at the launch of which Hughes met Sylvia Plath. The first issue appeared on 26 February 1956.

The journal was named after St Botolph's Church, Cambridge, as one of its founders, Lucas Myers, lived at the rectory of the church. It is considered as being amongst the earliest reactions to the perceived passionlessness and conventionality of figures such as Philip Larkin and Kingsley Amis, who were dominating the British literary scene of the time.

Plath went to the party with the express intention of meeting Hughes, having read and been impressed by his poetry in the journal earlier that day. Both poets went on to commemorate the meeting in their work, including Hughes's "St Botolph's", and Plath wrote an unfinished novel based around the meeting entitled Falcon Yard, the name of the street where the party was held.

A second edition was published in 2006. A copy of the original journal was stored in the British Library in 2010.

== Contributors ==
Along with Hughes, the other listed contributors are : David Ross, Daniel Huws, Daniel Weissbort, Lucas Myers, Nathaniel Minton and George Weissbort.
