= Tristan Egolf =

American author and activist (1971–2005)

- Born: December 19, 1971; San Lorenzo de El Escorial, Spain
- Died: May 7, 2005 (aged 33); Lancaster, Pennsylvania, U.S.
- Occupations: Novelist; author; political activist
- Children: 2
- Relatives: Gretchen Egolf (sister)
- Writing career
- Notable work: Lord of the Barnyard: Killing the Fatted Calf and Arming the Aware in the Corn Belt (1999)

Tristan Egolf (December 19, 1971 – May 7, 2005) was an American novelist, author, and political activist.

== Early life ==
Egolf was born in San Lorenzo de El Escorial, Spain. His father, Brad Evans, was a National Review journalist and his mother, Paula, a painter. His younger sister is American actress Gretchen Egolf. His younger half-brother is American/British musician Siegfried Faith-Evans. As a Roman Catholic, his godparents were Leo Brent Bozell II and Patricia Lee Buckley. His parents divorced in Egolf's childhood and he took the surname of his stepfather, Gary Egolf. It was life in Philadelphia, however, that inspired Egolf, along with summer visits to his father's new home in Indiana. He graduated from Hempfield High School in Landisville, Pennsylvania, in 1990. Egolf briefly attended Temple University, in Philadelphia.

== Music career ==
Egolf dropped out of Temple and joined a punk rock band "Freak Thing", later "Kitschchao". The band did release one 7" single on Compulsiv Records, but after the band was dissolved Egolf wanted to focus on his writing and moved to Paris, which he said was the best place to write about Kentucky, where Lord of the Barnyard was to be set. For 18 months, he wrote during the day and subsidized his rent by playing guitar in Irish bars and on the Pont des Arts as a street musician.

== Literary career ==
In Paris, Egolf struck up an acquaintance with Marie Modiano. Her father Patrick Modiano, French author and screenwriter (Lacombe Lucien) and later winner of the Nobel Prize in Literature, helped Egolf get his first novel published in France in 1998 by Gallimard after it had been rejected by more than 70 U.S. publishers. Lord of the Barnyard was subsequently published in the United Kingdom and the United States and received moderately favorable reviews – with a few raves worldwide. His second book, Skirt and the Fiddle, was published in 2002 to even better critical response; his third, Kornwolf, was published after his death. He had also been working on a screenplay for Lord of the Barnyard, left unfinished.

== Political activism ==
Outside his writing, Egolf achieved some renown as a political activist. In July 2004, he and a group of friends, later known as the Smoketown Six, were arrested outside Lancaster, Pennsylvania, for stripping down to thong underwear and piling on top of one another alongside a road that was being traveled by US President George W. Bush to protest the Abu Ghraib prison-abuse scandal.

== Death ==
On May 7, 2005, shortly after completing the manuscript for Kornwolf, Egolf shot himself in his apartment in Lancaster, Pennsylvania. He left behind a seven-year-old daughter born in France and a nine-month-old daughter born in the United States.

== Bibliography ==
- Lord of the Barnyard: Killing the Fatted Calf and Arming the Aware in the Corn Belt (1999)
- Skirt and the Fiddle (2002)
- Kornwolf (2006)
