= Valentina Polukhina =

British-Russian scholar (1936–2022)

Valentina Platonovna Polukhina (Russian: Валентина Платоновна Полухина; 18 June 1936 – 8 February 2022) was a British-Russian scholar, Emeritus Professor at Keele University, and the widow of Daniel Weissbort. She was the recipient of the A. C. Benson Medal and the Medal of Pushkin.

== Biography ==
Valentina Polukhina was born in Siberia and educated at Kemerovo, Tula and Moscow universities. From 1962 to 1973 she taught at Moscow's Lumumba University and from 1973 till 2001 was Professor at Keele University, England.

She was the author and editor of major studies of Joseph Brodsky, as well as publications on poets such as Akhmatova, Pasternak, Tsvetaeva, Khlebnikov and Mandelshtam. She had a particular interest in bringing living Russian literature to English audiences, organising the visits of many Russian writers and poets to Keele and other English universities. The post of Russian Poet in Residence at the University of Keele, as well as the Russian Poets Fund, were established thanks to her efforts.

In 1995, Polukhina – together with colleagues of the Russian Department at Keele University – established The Russian Poets Fund in order to invite Russian poets to British universities. The patrons of the fund were Prince Michael of Kent, the Bishop of Lichfield Keith Sutton, and Seamus Heaney. After Polukhina's retirement in 2001, she and her husband Daniel Weissbort ran the fund. They compiled and edited The Anthology of Russian Women Poets (2002) and invited several Russian women poets to present it at The Poetry International in London in 2002. Due to Weissbort's illness, the fund was closed in 2012 before being re-established in December 2014 with the help of poet Olga Shvarova. Rowan Williams and Andrew Motion replaced the deceased Heaney and Sutton.

Polukhina completed The Anthology of Poems Dedicated to Joseph Brodsky, under the title Iz nezabyvshikh menia ("By those who remember me") which include sixteen British and two Irish poets.

In 2014, she was awarded the A. C. Benson Medal by the Royal Society of Literature and in 2018 was awarded the Medal of Pushkin for the service to Russian and British culture and for the study and preservation of cultural heritage.

Polukhina died on 8 February 2022, at the age of 85.

== Publications ==
=== Selected books ===
- Joseph Brodsky: A Study of Metaphor: Ph.D. Dissertation, Keele University, three vols., 1985.
- Joseph Brodsky: A Poet for Our Time (Cambridge University Press, 1989, 2009), xx + 324pp.
- Brodsky’s Poetics and Aesthetics (London: The Macmillan Press, 1990, co-editor with Lev Loseff and contributor), x + 204pp.
- Brodsky Through the Eyes of his Contemporaries (New York: St. Martin's Press and Basingstoke/London: The Macmillan Press, 1992), xi + 257pp.
- Literary Tradition and Practice in Russian Culture. Papers from an International Conference on the occasion of the Seventieth birthday of Yu. M. Lotman, co-editor with Joe Andrew and Robert Reid, contributed an article (Amsterdam: Rodopi, 1993), xii + 341pp.
- Russian Culture: Semiotic and Structure, co-editor with Joe Andrew and Robert Reid, contributed an article (Amsterdam: Russian Literature, Special issue – Ju.M. Lotman, I, XXXVI–II, November 1994).
- Structure and Tradition in Russian Society, co-editor with Joe Andrew and Robert Reid (Helsinki: Slavica Helsingiensia, 1994), 186pp.
- Brodsky through the Eyes of his Contemporaries, in Russian: 6. Brodskii glazami sovremennikov (Spb: Zvezda, 1997), 335 pp.
- Joseph Brodsky: The Art of a Poem, collected, edited and introduced, with Lev Loseff, contributed an article (London: The Macmillan Press, New York: St. Martin's Press, 1999), xv + 257pp.
- Joseph Brodsky, A Book of Interviews, in Russian: Iosif Brodskii, Kniga interv’iu, Collected and edited by V. Polukhina (M: Zakharov, 2000, 2005, 20072010), 783 pp.
- Brodsky as a Critic, guest editor Valentina Polukhina, (Amsterdam: Russian Literature, XLVII-III/IV, 1 April/15 May 2000).
- How Brodsky’s Poem Works, in Russian: Kak rabotaet stikhotvorenie Brodskogo. Iz issledovatelei slavistov na Zapade, edited by Lev Loseff & V. Polukhina (M: NLO, 2002), 303 pp.
- Brodsky’s Poetics, in Russian: Poetika Brodskogo. Sbornik nauchnykh trudov, edited by V. Polukhina, I. Fomenko & A, Stepanov (Tver’, 2003), 472 pp.
- Joseph Brodsky: Strategy of Reading, in Russian: Iosif Brodskii: Strategiya chteniya, edited by V. Polukhina, A. Korchinsky & Yu. Troitsky (M: Izdatel’stvo Ippolitova, 2005), 521 pp.
- An Anthology of Russian Women Poets, eds. V. Polukhina & D. Weissbort (University of Iowa Press, 2005).
- Brodsky through the Eyes of his Contemporaries in 3 volumes. In Russian: Brodskii glazami sovremennikov (SPb: Zvezda, 1997, 2006, 2010).
- Brodsky Through the Eyes of his Contemporaries, interviews with 21 poets, in English (Brighton, MA: Academic Studies, 2008), vol. I (1989-2003), 392pp.
- Brodsky Through the Eyes of his Contemporaries, interviews with 40 poets, writers, translators, friends and relatives, in English (Brighton, MA: Academic Studies, 2008), vol. II (1996-2008), 604pp.
- More than Himself, in Russian: Bol’she samogo sebia. O Brodskom (Tomsk: ID SK-C, 2009), 416 pp.
- Evterpa and Cleo of Joseph Brodsky. Chronology of his Life (Tomsk, 2012), in Russian (Томск: ID SK-C, 2012).
- Anthology of poems dedicated to Joseph Brodsky - Ia nezabyvshikh menia. Antologiya stikhov, posviashchennykh Brodskomu (Tomsk, 2015).
- The Dictionary of Colours of Joseph Brodsky's Poetry, in Russian: Slovar’ tsveta poezii Iosifa Brodskogo (Moscow: NLO, 2016), 268 pp.

=== Selected articles, interviews, reviews ===
- A Few General Observations on Brodsky's World, Screever, (Keele, 1978), no. 1, pз. 14-16.
- The «Strange” Theme in Brodsky’s Poetry, Essays in Poetics, 1979, vol. 4, No. 1, pp. 35–54.
- A Study of Metaphor in Progress: Poetry of Joseph Brodsky, Wiener Slawisticher Almanach, 1986, Bd. 17, pp. 149–185.
- Similarity in Disparity, Brodsky's Poetics and Aesthetics (London: Macmillan Press, 1990), editor Lev Loseff & V. Polukhina, pp. 150–175.
- “The Self in Exile», Writing in Exile. Renaissance and Modern Studies, Vol. 34, 1991, University of Nottingham, pp. 9–18;
- Brodsky's Poetic Self-Portrait, New Direction in Soviet Literature. Selected papers from the Fourth Congress of Soviet & East European Studies, Harrogate, 1990 (London, NY, 1992), pp. 122–137.
- «The Myth of the Poet and the Poet of the Myth: Russian Poets on Brodsky», Russian Writers on Russian Writers, Ed. by Faith Wigzell (Oxford/Providence, USA: Berg., 1994), pp. 139–159.
- In memory of Joseph Brodsky, British East-West Journal, no. 404, Sept. 1996, pp. 10–11.
- Obituary: Joseph Brodsky 1940-1996, Slavonica, vol. 2, no. 2, 1995/96, pp. 123–128.
- A Part of Speech. Poems by Joseph Brodsky, The Reference Guide to World Literature (Detroit: St. James Press, 1995), p. 188-191.
- Brodsky's View on Translation, Modern Poetry in Translation, 1996, no. 10, pp. 26–31.
- An Interview with Sir Isaiah Berlin, in Russian: Znamia, 1996, no. 11, pp. 130–133.
- An Interview with John le Carre, in Russian: Znamia, 1996, no. 11, pp. 133–138.
- An Interview with Michael Ignatiev, in Russian: Znamia, 1996, no. 11, pp. 138–141.
- An Interview with Prof. Gerald Smith, in Russian: Znamia, 1996, no. 11, pp. 141–143.
- An Interview with Al Alvarez, in Russian: Znamia, 1996, no. 11, pp. 143–146.
- An Interview with Prof. Daniel Weissbort, in Russian: Znamia, 1996, no. 11, pp. 146–150.
- Brodsky in England, in Russian: Znamia, 1996, no. 11, pp. 126–129.
- Methamophoses of «I» in Post-Modernists Poetry: Doubles in Brodsky's Poetic World, in Russian: «Metamorfozy «ia» v poezii postmodernizma: dvoiniki v poeticheskom mire Brodskogo», Slavica Helsingiensia, vol. 16, 1996, pp. 391–407.
- An Interview with Olga Sedakova, in Russian: "Chtoby rech’ stala tvoei rech’iu", Novoe literatirnoe obozrenie, no. 17, 1996, pp. 318–254.
- An Interview with Lev Loseff, in Russian: Novoe predstavlenie o poezii, Zvezda, 1997, no. 1, pp. 159–172.
- A Noble Quixotic Sight, An Interview with Roy Fisher, in Russian: "Blagorodnyi trud Don Kikhota", Zvezda, no. 1, 1997, pp. 173–183
- Joseph Brodsky, Encyclopedia of the Essays (London: Fitzroy Dearborn, 1997), pp. 113–115.
- More than One: The Doubles in Brodsky's Poetic World, Neo-Formalist Papers. Contributions to the Silver Jubilee Conference to mark 25 years of Neo-Formalist Circle (Amsterdam: Rodopi, 1998), pp. 222–243.
- Joseph Brodsky, «A Part of Speech», The Reference Guide to Russian Literature (London, 1999), pp. 195–196.
- Essay on Joseph Brodsky's «To Urania», The Reference Guide to Russian Literature, ed. Neil Cornwell (London: Fitzroy Dearborn Publishers, 1998), pp. 196–197.
- More than One: The Doubles in Brodsky's Poetic World, Twentieth-century Russian Literature: selected Papers from the Fifth World Congress of Central and East-European Studies, Ed. Karen Ryan-Hayes (Macmillan Press, 2000), pp. 257–279.
- Pleasing the Shadows: Brodsky’s Debts to Pushkin and Dante, Semicerchio Rivista di Poesia Comparata, XXVIII (2003)/1), pp. 19–30.
- Pushkin and Brodsky: The Art of Self-deprecation, Two Hundred Years of Pushkin. Vol. I: Pushkin’s Secrets: Russian Writers Reread and Rewrite Pushkin (Amsterdam, New York, 2003), pp. 153–174.
- The Poet’s Meow, Ars Interpres, 2004, no. 3 (Stockholm), pp. 111–113.
- Seamus Heaney in conversation with Valentina Polukhina, Ars Interpres, 2004, no. 3 (Stockholm), pp. 287–293.
- Les Murray in conversation with Valentina Polukhina, Ars Interpres, 2004, no. 3 (Stockholm), pp. 297–303.
- Seamus Heaney and Valentina Polukhina in Conversation, London Magazine, August/September 2007, pp. 58–70.
- Susan Sontag and Valentina Polukhina in Conversation, London Magazine, October/November 2007, pp. 45–57.
- Obituary: Elena Shvarts, Independent, 16 June 2010.
- Valentina Polukhina's Interview with William Wadsworth on J. Brodsky, Herald of Europe, no. 7, pp. 142–150.
- Brodsky: The Last Poet in the Russian Heroic Tradition, Valentina Polukhina — David Bethea, Cardinal Points, Literary Journal, Vol. I, pp. 140–148.
- An interview with Natalya Gorbanevskaya, Natalya Gorbanevskaya, Selected Poems (M.: Carcanet, 2011), pp. 107–118.
- Liubov’ est’ predislovie k razluke. Poslanie k MK, Novoe literaturnor obozrenie, № 112, 2011.
- Valentina Polukhina in conversation with Czeslaw Milosz, in Polish: Zeszyty Literackie, 2011, Special Issue.
- On Evgeniya Uzvarina’s poetry, Anthology of contemporary Ural poetry 2004/2010 (Chelyabinsk: "Desiat' tysiach slov", 2011, pp. 312–313.
- On Natalya Starodubtseva’s poetry, Anthology of contemporary Ural poetry 2004/2010 (Chelyabinsk: "Desiat’ tysiach slov", 2011, pp. 342–343.
- Condemned to Poetry, an Interview with Valentina Polukhina by Inna Kulisheva, magazine Zvezda, no. 2, 2012, pp. 144–155.
- Ritmy Rossii v tvorchestve Brodskogo, Vestnik Novosibirskogo Poeticheskogo Marafona, no. 4, Novosibirsk, 2012, pp. 70–74.
- Vektor v nichto. Interview with Joseph Brodsky, sbornik nauchnykh trudov: «Iosif Brodsky: problemy poetiki» (M.: NLO, 2012), pp. 425–439.
- Potomkam s liubov'iu, an Interview with Valentina Polukhina by Tatiana Yufit, «Angliya», Russian newspaper in London, 7–13 December, p. 17.
- An Interview with Valentina Polukhina by Irina Chaikovskaya, magazine «Novy bereg», no. 40, 2013-11-03; reprinted in an American magazine «Chaika», no. 19, 1–15 October 2013, pp. 49–53.
- A preface to the first posthumous publication of Regina Derieva's poems. Звезда 2014, no. 4
- Taina «Pokhoron Bobo», Novoe Literaturnoe obozrenie, Moscow, 2014, no. 126, pp. 306–313.
- Tajemnica “Pogrzeba Bobo”, PRZEKTADANIEC, A Journal of Translation Studies. Brodsky, no. 30/2015 (Krakow, Wydawnictwo Uniwersytetu Jagiellonskiego, 2015), pp. 45–56
- An Interview with Valentina Polukhina by Olga Shvarova, Kiev, magazine "Sho", No 305, 2016.
- Pobegi smysla, A foreword to a poetry book by Tatiana Shcherbina, "Khroniki" (Moscow: Vremia, 2017), pp. 20–32.
- Joseph Brodsky in Great Britain in "Russian Heritage in the Contemporary world", London, May 2018, pp. 94–109.
- An open letter to Dmitry Bykov. "I ja ne prevrashus' v sud'ju", Rossiyskaya Gazeta, 10 December 2018.<ref>
- An Interview with Valentina Polukhina by Boris Fabrikant, magazine "Etazhi", no. 1 (13) March 2019, pp. 111–128.
- A Bibliography of George Kline's Published Translations of Joseph Brodsky's Poems. In Cynthia Haven "The Man Who Brought Brodsky Into English. Conversation with George.L Kline". USA, Academic Studies Press, 2021, pp. 188–194.
- Afterword to Cynthia Haven "The Man Who Brought Brodsky Into English. Conversation with George.L Kline". USA, Academic Studies Press, 2021, pp. 201–203.
- Joseph Brodsky by David Morphet and Valentina Polukhina "Poetry in isolation" No 3, Essays by Members of the Athenaeum, January–March 2021, pp. 36–54
