= La Place de l'Étoile =

La Place de l'Étoile may refer to:

- Place de l'Étoile, the historical name of Place Charles de Gaulle, a road junction in Paris
- La Place de l'Étoile (novel), a 1968 novel by Patrick Modiano
