= Regina Derieva =

Russian poet and writer (1949–2013)

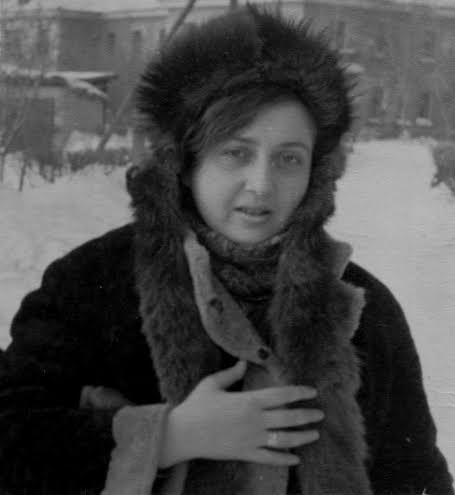
- Derieva in Karaganda, Kazakh SSR, 1972
- Born: 7 February 1949; Odessa, Ukrainian SSR, Soviet Union
- Died: 11 December 2013 (aged 64)
- Website: http://www.derieva.com/

Regina Iosifovna Derieva (Russian: Регина Иосифовна Дериева, IPA: [rʲɪˈɡʲinə ɪˈosʲɪfəvnə dʲɪˈrʲijɪvə]; 7 February 1949 – 11 December 2013) was a Ukrainian-born Russian-language poet and writer who published around thirty books of poetry, essays, and prose. From July 1999 until her death she lived in Sweden.

Joseph Brodsky called Derieva "a great poet", stressing that her poems are hers "only by name, only by her craft". "The real authorship belongs here to poetry itself, to freedom itself. I have not met anything similar for a long time, neither among my fellow countrymen nor among English-speaking poets". Tomas Venclova has stated that " Regina Derieva was, first and foremost, a Christian poet, a worthy heir of a long line of metaphysical poets, be they English, French or Russian. Far from any inflated rhetoric or didactics, her poems reached the very core of the Christian experience, which meant serious and fearless attitude to life, suffering and death. The imagery and syntax of the Gospels and the Books of Prophets was, for her, a natural element just as apocalyptic presentiments and mystical hope formed the axis of her world-outlook". Les Murray has a blurb on the back cover of Derieva's Alien Matter : ”Science teaches that eighty percent of the universe consists of dark matter, so called. Regina Derieva learned this same fact in a very hard school. She does not consent to it, though. She knows that the hurt truth in us points to a dimension where, for example, victory is cleansed of battle. Her strict, economical poems never waver from that orientation”.

Derieva's work has been translated into several languages, including English, French, Swedish, Arabic, Italian, Chinese, Thai, Greek, and other languages. A compact disc with her readings in Russian of selected poems was issued in 1999. Derieva's work has appeared in the Poetry magazine, Evergreen Review, Modern Poetry in Translation, Poetry East, The Liberal, Ars Interpres, Salt Magazine, Quadrant, Notre Dame Review, Dublin Poetry Review, Quarterly Literary Review Singapore, Words Without Borders, St. Petersburg Review, Poetry International, Artful Dodge, Atlanta Review, POEM Magazine, The Hopkins Review, The American Poetry Review, Post_Road_(magazine), The_Baffler as well as in many Russian and Swedish magazines.

She translated poetry by Thomas Merton and contemporary American, Australian, British, Polish, and Swedish poets. Regina Derieva participated in a number of Swedish and international poetry festivals.

Derieva's poetry is strongly affected by her Catholic faith. In 1996, a significant Italian composer and organist, Fra Armando Pierucci, composed a cantata for the series of Regina Derieva's poems. This cantata is titled Via Crucis. In 2003, she received the Shannon Fellowship of the International Thomas Merton Society. In 2009, the Catholic Church in Sweden awarded her the ORA ET LABORA medal for her literary work.

Regina Derieva's funeral took place on December 23, 2013, and she is buried at the Norra Begravningsplatsen (Katolska Kyrkogården) in Stockholm.

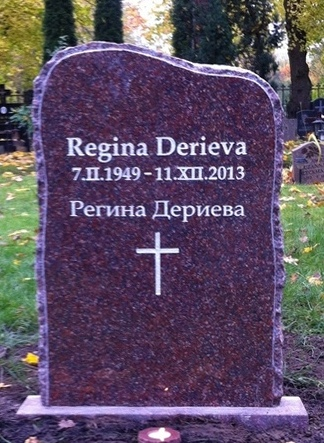
Regina Derieva's gravestone

The volume of poetry, memoirs, essays, fiction, and photographs in honor of Regina Derieva, Curator Aquarum, was published in 2015. Her papers are at Stanford University.

== Works ==
Books of Poetry

- Handwriting (Russian: Почерк). Alma-Ata: Zhazuchy, 1978.
- Life Junction (Russian: Узел жизни). Alma-Ata: Zhazuchy, 1980.
- The First Sledge Road of Winter (Russian: По первопутку). Alma-Ata: Zhazuchy, 1985.
- Two Skies (Russian: Два неба). Alma-Ata: Zhazuchy, 1990.
- Absence (Russian: Отсутствие). Tenafly, NJ: Hermitage, 1993.
- Prayer of the Day (Russian: Молитва дня). Jerusalem: Radost' Voskresenia Publishers, 1994.
- The Last War (Sound book). © 1998 by Holyland Records Ltd. Compact disk.
- De profundis (in Russian). Jerusalem: Magnificat Institute, 1998.
- Via Crucis (in English, Italian, and Russian). Jerusalem: Magnificat Institute, 1998.
- Inland Sea and Other Poems. South Shields, UK: The Divine Art, 1998.
- Winter Lectures for Terrorists (Russian: Зимние лекции для террористов). London: Horse Books, 1998.
- I nuovi fioretti di S. Francesco (in Italian and Arabic). East Jerusalem: Artistic Press, 1998.
- The Pilgrim's Star. South Shields, UK: The Divine Art, 1999.
- L'Etoile du Pelerin. South Shields, UK: The Divine Art, 1999.
- Instructions for Silence (in French, English, and Russian). Jerusalem: Abbaye de Latroun, 1999.
- In Commemoration of Monuments (in English and Russian). East Jerusalem: Art Printing Press, 1999.
- Fugitive Space (Russian: Беглое пространство). Stockholm: Hylaea, 2001.
- The Last Island (in English and Russian). Stockholm: Hylaea, 2002.
- Himmelens Geometri. Skelleftea, Sweden: Norma-Artos, 2003.
- A Collection of Roads: Selected Poems (Russian: Собрание дорог). St. Petersburg: Aletheia, 2005.
- Alien Matter. New York: Spuyten Duyvil, 2005.
- Allt som tolv kejsare inte hunnit säga (in Swedish and English). Stockholm: Ars Interpres Publications, 2006.
- Oavbrutet svarta bilder. Göteborg: Carl Forsbergs bokförlag, 2007.
- The sum total of violations. Translated by Daniel Weissbort. UK: Arc Publications, 2009.
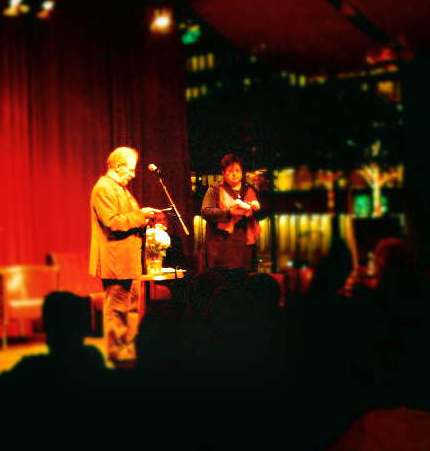
  Regina Derieva with Daniel Weissbort at the Kulturhuset in Stockholm. Ars Interpres Poetry Festival, October, 2004.
- Corinthian Copper. Translated by J. Kates. Grosse Pointe Farms, MI: Marick Press, 2010.
- Chleb i Sól. Poznań: Flos Carmeli, 2015.
- Selected poetry & prose in 2 volumes (Russian: Сочинения Регины Дериевой). St. Petersburg: Zhurnal "Zvezda", 2015.
- Den tatuerade Mnemosyne. Stockholm: AIP, 2016.
- Speglingar. Bonn: Pamphilus Press, 2020.
- Earthly Lexicon. Washington: Marick Press, 2019/2020.
- Images in Black, Continuous. Translated by Frederick Smock. Boston: M-Graphics Publishing, 2021.
- Efter Pictor. Bonn: Pamphilus Press, 2021.
- Selected Clouds (in Ukrainian). Odessa: Bondarenko M. O, 2024.
- Det ändlösa kriget(in Swedish). Stockholm: Bokförlaget Faethon, 2025.

Books of Essays

- Three Possibilities to See the Kingdom of God. Jerusalem: Alphabet Publishers, 1994.
- The Meaning of Mystery. Jerusalem: Proche-Orient Chrétien and Modex, 1998.

Books of Prose

- In the World of Awful Thoughts (Russian: В мире страшных мыслей). East Jerusalem: Art Printing Press, 1998.
- The World is Full of Fools (Russian: Придурков всюду хватает). Moscow: Tekst, 2002.
- De yttre tingens ordning. Sentenser, sarkasmer, paradoxer. Stockholm: Bokförlaget Faethon, 2020.

Books of Translation into Russian

- Smock, Frederick. Poems. New York: Ars-Interpres, 2002.
- Murray, Les. The End of Symbol. New York and Stockholm: Ars-Interpres, 2004.
- Kinsella, John. The Sky's Imperative. New York and Stockholm: Ars-Interpres, 2004.
- Weissbort, Daniel. The Name's Progress. Stockholm: Ars Interpres Publications, 2006.
- Wästberg, Per. Ortsbestämning. Stockholm: Ars Interpres Publications, 2008.

Poems and Prose Published in Anthologies

- An Hour of Poetry (Russian: Час поэзии). Moscow: Molodaya Gvardiya, 1965.
- Joking Aside! (Russian: Шутки в сторону). Alma-Ata: Zhazuchy, 1989.
- An Anthology of Russian Free Verses (Russian: Антология русского верлибра). Moscow: Prometei, 1991.
- Strophes of the Century: An Anthology of Russian Poetry (Russian: Строфы Века. Антология русской поэзии). Moscow and Minsk: Polyfact, 1995.
- Christus in der russischen Literatur. München: Verlag Otto Sagner in Kommission, 1999.
- An Anthology of Contemporary Russian Women Poets. Manchester: Carcanet Press, 2005.
- New European Poets. Minneapolis: Graywolf Press, 2008.
- The Poet and His World. Nicosia: En Tipis Publications, 2010.
- IOU: New Writing on Money. Concord, MA: Concord Free Press, 2010.
- Hamlet. Variations. Through the Pages of Russian Poetry (Russian: Гамлет. Вариации. По страницам русской поэзии). Moscow: Tsentr Knigi Rudomino, 2012.
- “From Those Who Remember Me”. Tomsk: 2015.
- “'In Holy Week”. Moscow: Art-Vision, 2021.
