= Lord of the Barnyard =

1998 novel by Tristan Egolf

- Author: Tristan Egolf
- Language: English
- Genre: Novel
- Published: 1998
- Publisher: Gallimard
- Publication date: 1998
- Publication place: United States
- English publication date: 2000
- Media type: Print (Hardback & Paperback)
- Pages: 420 p. (paperback edition)
- ISBN: 978-0-8021-3672-5 (paperback edition)

Lord of the Barnyard is a novel by Tristan Egolf.

== Plot synopsis ==
Somewhere in Kentucky, perhaps Indiana, we learn via third person narration about the life of John Kaltenbrunner.

The story follows the life of John and his unimaginably bad luck, until he meets a group that is even worse off: garbage men whom the town considers the lowest of the low. To aid them, John decides to start a trash-collection strike with major consequences.

== Critical reception ==
A review in The New York Times called the novel "both interesting and exciting without quite managing to be good." A review by Kirkus found that in the novel Egolf "too frequently fails to dramatize, indulging instead in lengthy (and, to be fair, frequently hilarious) summary jeremiads."

== Publication ==
Lord of the Barnyard, Egolf's first novel, was rejected by over 50 publishers. It was finally accepted after Egolf befriended French novelist Patrick Modiano's daughter.

The novel was first published in a French translation by Gallimard in 1998 before being picked by Grove Press (US) and Picador (UK) who published the original English text.
