= Armando Pierucci =

Italian composer

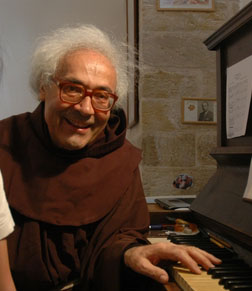
Fra Armando Pierucci

Fra Armando Pierucci (born 3 September 1935 in Moie, Italy) is an Italian Franciscan musician who lives in Jerusalem. He graduated from the Pontifical Institute of Sacred Music in Rome, from the Music Conservatories of Naples, and from the Rossini Music Conservatory in Pesaro. Some of his composition professors include Maestro Vincenzo Donato (who studied with Ottorino Respighi) and Maestro Argenzio Jorio.

== Career ==
Pierucci was an Organ professor at the Rossini Music Conservatory of Pesaro. Today many of his past students teach music at various Italian Music Conservatories. He has conducted choirs and given organ recitals in Italy, Greece, Cyprus, and the Holy Land. Since 1988, he has been the organist at the Church of the Holy Sepulchre in Jerusalem. from 1989 to 1999, he was Chief Editor of the Italian magazine La Terra Santa ("Holy Land"), quarterly published by the Franciscan Custody of the Holy Land. Presently, he is a professor of sacred music at the Studium Theologicum Hierosolymitanum and President of the Magnificat Musical Institute.

Fra Armando Pierucci has composed music for organ, choir, recorder, accordion, brass, and piano, including:

- 4 Cori su testo di Salvatore Quasimodo (Ediz. Berben),
- Callido verde (Ediz. Berben),
- Quaderno d’Organo: 14 composizioni per organo (Ediz. Armelin Musica Padova),
- Missa de Angelis Pacis,
- Missa Regina Pacis,
- Missa Magnificabant Omnes,
- Missa Regina Palestinae,
- Sonata for Organ and Choir,
- The Hymnal,
- Zahr Er-Rahm (fifteen songs for voice and piano).

Armando Pierucci's first cantata, over poems by Regina Derieva, Via Crucis was described as "a major find" and "a remarkable work" by critics. In 2001, Fra Armando Pierucci created another cantata over Derieva's poems entitled De Profundis.
