= Ars Interpres =

- Editor: Alexander Deriev
- Categories: Literature, Poetry, Translation, Arts
- Frequency: 2 per year
- Founded: 2003
- Final issue: 2012
- Country: Sweden
- Based in: Stockholm
- Website: www.arsint.com
- ISSN: 1652-6368

Ars Interpres was an online and in-print international literary journal, originating in Stockholm. It published primarily contemporary English language poetry and English translations of modern Scandinavian and European poetry, as well as articles on poetic translation and other related materials. Ars Interpres also includes reviews, review-essays, interviews, art, and photography. According to their website, it stopped publication in 2012.

The magazine featured fiction, poetry, interviews and essays by such internationally renowned writers as Les Murray, Ruth Padel, Göran Sonnevi, Eamon Grennan, Pia Tafdrup, Seamus Heaney, Giannina Braschi, Nuala Ní Dhomhnaill, Tadeusz Różewicz, Diane di Prima, Regina Derieva, Alicia Ostriker, Dennis Nurkse, Tomas Venclova, Mariela Griffor, John Kinsella, and Gunnar Harding. In addition Ars Interpres published translations of international poetry, new versions of classical poems, and translations of European and Russian poets of the past such as Giacomo Leopardi, Gerrit Achterberg, and Osip Mandelstam.

The journal's staff organised the Ars Interpres annual poetry festival.

== See also ==
- List of literary magazines
