= Modern Poetry in Translation =

UK literary magazine and publisher

- Cover of issue no. 3 (series 3), 2017
- Editor: Janani Ambikapathy
- Categories: Literary magazine
- Frequency: Three times a year
- Founded: 1965
- Country: United Kingdom
- Based in: Oxford
- Language: English
- Website: Official website

Modern Poetry in Translation is a literary magazine and publisher based in the United Kingdom. The magazine was started by Ted Hughes and Daniel Weissbort in 1965. It was relaunched by King's College London in 1992. The college published it until 2003. It publishes contemporary poetry from all around the world, in English.

Its first issue was a landmark. Writers previously unknown to the West were introduced by Hughes and Weissbort. The list included Miroslav Holub, Yehuda Amichai, Ivan Lalić, Zbigniew Herbert, Czesław Miłosz (who would later win the Nobel Prize in Literature), Andrei Voznesensky, and Vasko Popa (later written of as "one of the best European poets writing today" by literary critic John Bayley of Oxford University in an essay in The New York Review of Books on a translation of Popa by Anne Pennington with an introduction by Ted Hughes in "The Persea Series of Poetry in Translation," general editor Daniel Weissbort).

Founder and editor Weissbort headed The University of Iowa translation workshop program for decades. Of his many books, Weissbort edited Translation: Theory and Practice: A Historical Reader that was published by the Oxford University Press, edited with Astradur Eysteinsson. The London Guardian newspaper wrote that Weissbort founded Carcanet Press. The Wall Street Journal excerpted a Weissbort translation of Missing Person by Patrick Modiano after Modiano received the Nobel Prize for Literature.

On the Stanford University site of The Book Haven by Cynthia Haven, in an obituary of Daniel Weissbort, Daniel Weissbort is defined as a "master translator." Also on this Stanford University web site, Weissbort is called a champion of translation. Weissbort has genius in translation, obituary of Weissbort in Translationista.

To celebrate the magazine's 50th anniversary, a microsite was developed to present the first issue of Modern Poetry in Translation in its entirety, including high resolution scans of the original print document. The microsite was expanded to a full website at www.modernpoetryintranslation.com in 2018. The original anniversary microsite, and first issue, is available at modernpoetryintranslation.com/home-50 via the Wayback Machine.

From 2012 to 2017 Sasha Dugdale was the editor of Modern Poetry in Translation, overseeing a redesign and publishing sixteen issues of the magazine as well as its fiftieth anniversary anthology Centres of Cataclysm (Bloodaxe, 2016). Clare Pollard was editor from 2017 to 2022. From issue No. 3 2022 (Wrap It in Banana Leaves: The Food Focus) the editor has been Khairani Barokka until November 2023. Managing Editor Sarah Hesketh edited Bearing the Burden of Sameness: Focus on Care (April 2024). From July 2024 the magazine is edited by Janani Ambikapathy.

== Magazine issues ==
Salam to Gaza: Focus on Dissent and Resistance (2024 No 2)

Bearing the Burden of Sameness: Focus on Care (2024 No 1)

Fresh and Salt: Focus on Water (2023 No 3)

Call the Sea a Poet: Focus on Malta (2023 No 2)

Measureless Melodies: Focus on Vietnam (2023 No 1)

Wrap it in Banana Leaves: The Food Focus (2022 No 3)

The Previous Song: Focus on Somali Poetry (2022 No 2)

The Fingers of Our Soul: The Bodies Focus (2022 No 1)

Slap Bang: Focus on German-Language poetry (2021 No 3)

If No One Names Us: Focus on Mexico (2021 No 2)

Clean Hands: Focus on the Pandemic in Europe (2021 No 1)

Origins of the Fire Emoji: Focus on Dead [Women] Poets (2020 No 3)

The World for a Moment: Focus on Czech Poetry (2020 No 2)

Dream Colours: Focus on Japan (2020 No 1)

I Have not Known a Grief Like This: Focus on Extinction (2019 No 3)

The Illuminated Paths: Focus on Poets of the Maghreb (2019 No 2)

Our Small Universe: Focus on Languages of the United Kingdom (2019 No 1)

In a Winter City: Focus on Hungary and Ted Hughes (2018 No 3) See more

The House of Thirst: Focus on LGBTQ+ Poetry (2018 No 2 ) See more

Profound Pyromania: Focus on Caribbean Poetry (2018 No 1) See more

War of the Beasts and the Animals: Russian and Ukrainian Poetry (2017 No 3) See more

A Blossom Shroud: Focus on the Poets of Shubbak (2017 No 2) See more

Songs of the Shattered Throat: Focus on the Languages of India (2017 No 1) See more

The Blue Vein: Focus on Korean Poetry (2016 No 3) See more

One Thousand Suns: Focus on the Languages of Africa (2016 No 2) See more

The Great Flight: Refugee Focus (2016 No 1) See more

The Tangled Route: Uruguayan Focus (2015 No 3) See more

I WISH... Children's Focus: (2015 No 2)

Scorched Glass: Iranian Focus (2015 No 1)

The Singing of the Scythe: Poetry of The First World War (2014 No 3)

The Constellation: Poetry International (2014 No 2)

Twisted Angels: Brazilian Focus (2014 No 1)

Secret Agents of Sense: Polish Focus (2013 No 3)

Between Clay and Star: Romanian Focus (2013 No 2)

Strange Tracks: Focus on Dutch Poetry (2013 No 1)
