= George Weissbort =

- Born: 11 April 1928; Brussels, Belgium
- Died: 9 July 2013 (aged 85); Wye Valley
- Education: Central Saint Martins College of Art and Design
- Known for: Painting
- Website: George Weissbort's official site

George Weissbort (11 April 1928, Brussels, Belgium – 9 July 2013, Wye Valley) was a Belgian-born British artist. He lived and painted in Wye Valley, England. The critic Brian Sewell, who considered him an important exponent of an earlier style at a time not widely receptive to it, described him as having "painted the right pictures at the wrong time".

== Early development ==
George Weissbort was born into a Polish-Jewish family in Brussels, Belgium, but following Hitler's accession to the German chancellorship in 1933, moved with his family to London. Growing up in London, Weissbort's early associations and influences included the "experimental" artist and author Arthur Segal, another recent émigré, whose conversion from abstract impressionism to realism initiated Weissbort's lifelong interest in optical realism. Weissbort attended the Central Saint Martins College of Art and Design in London in the 1940s where he was taught by Ruskin Spear and Rodrigo Moynihan. While there, he studied life drawing under Bernard Meninsky.

His brother was the poet and literary academic, Daniel Weissbort.

His artistic œuvre includes life drawings, landscapes, still lifes, commissioned portraits and self-portraiture. Weissbort's art has been exhibited regularly at the Royal Academy and the Royal Academy of Portrait Painters.

== Style ==
After initial experiments in the styles of Paul Cézanne and Henri Matisse, Weissbort re-focused his energies towards the study of the "Old Masters", developing an enduring interest in the work of such artists as Johannes Vermeer, Jean-Baptiste-Siméon Chardin, Diego Velázquez, Jean-Baptiste-Camille Corot, Andrea Mantegna and Titian. The great body of Weissbort's work, which spans seven decades, constitutes a sustained exploration of figurative representation. Applying with expertise many of the techniques employed by the Old Masters, Weissbort's work is concerned with the visual interpretation and representation of the natural world through a persistent and intense examination of shapes, patterns, compositional relationships, tonal nuances and the qualities of lines and edges. Thus, rejecting the tenets of contemporary conceptual art, Weissbort's work revives an older concern with observational skills and technical mastery. "To paint in the spirit of Poussin, Chardin, Piero, Vermeer and Holbein in the 21st century", Anthony Rudolf writes, "is, for this painter, a radical project of artistic reclaimation and psychic renewal."

There have been three retrospectives of Weissbort's work:

- The Chambers Gallery, London, 2006
- Denise Yapp Gallery of Contemporary Art, Monmouth, 2008.
- Denise Yapp Gallery of Contemporary Art, Monmouth, 2015
