= Dora Bruder =

Book by Patrick Modiano

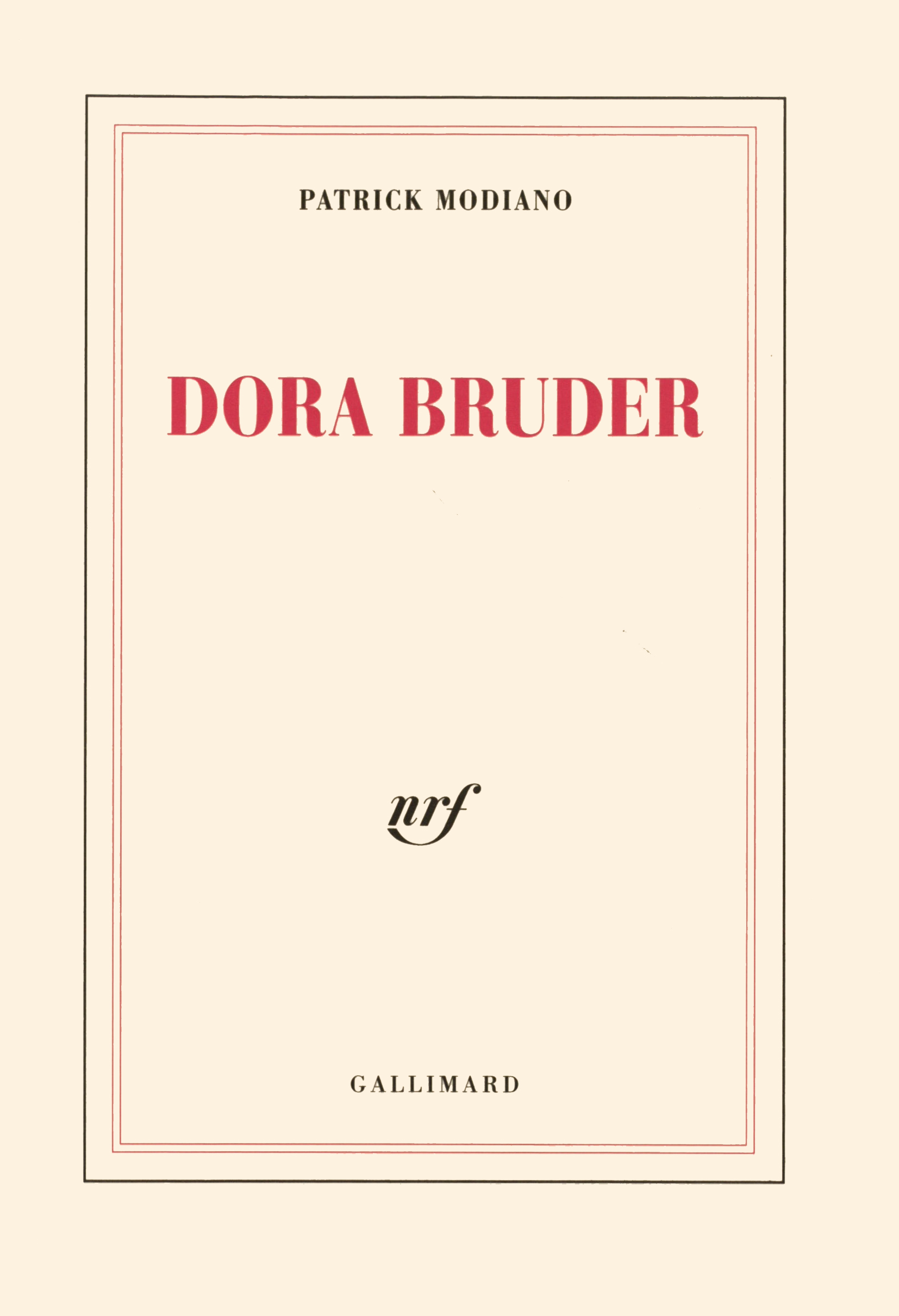

Dora Bruder is a biography, an autobiography and a detective novel by French writer Patrick Modiano about a Jewish teenage girl who went missing during the German occupation of Paris. It was first published in French on 2 April 1997 and published in English in December 1999.

The book is also entitled The Search Warrant for the British edition of the translation.

== Plot ==
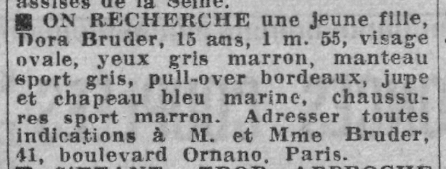

The book starts when the narrator comes across a missing person ad in the Paris Soir newspaper on 31 December 1941 looking for Dora Bruder. She is a 15-year-old Jewish girl. Modiano starts his investigations based on public records and conversations with Dora's family members. She was born in the 12th arrondissement and lives in 18th arrondissement of Paris. Her parents sent her to a catholic school in December 1941 from which she ran away. She was later found in April 1942 but her father, a Jew of Austrian background, had been arrested and sent to the internment camp of Drancy where she will also end up. Dora and her father will eventually be deported to Auschwitz on 18 September 1942.

== Themes ==
Dora Bruder is a typical example of the themes found across Modiano's work such as memory, loss, recovery, time.

The German occupation of Paris and the status of the Jews in Paris during this time is also a central theme of Modiano's work since his first novel.

Across the story, Modiano adds his personal experiences with his father through Dora's interactions with her family, his life in the same neighbourhood or his escape from school when he was 14.
