= Daniel Weissbort =

British writer

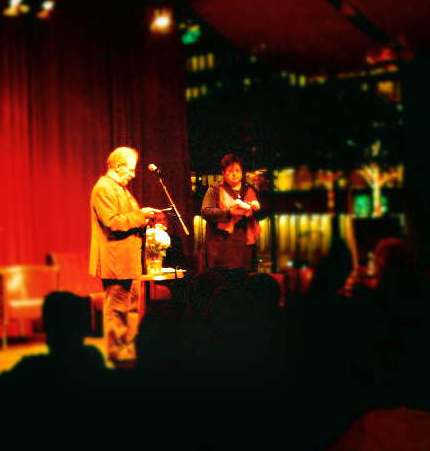
- Daniel Weissbort with Regina Derieva at the Kulturhuset in Stockholm. Ars Interpres Poetry Festival, October 2004.
- Born: Daniel Jack Weissbort; 30 April 1935
- Died: 18 November 2013 (aged 78)
- Spouse: Valentina Polukhina
- Website: http://www.mptmagazine.com/page/danielweissbort

Daniel Weissbort (30 April 1935 – 18 November 2013) was a poet, translator, multilingual academic and (together with Ted Hughes) founder and editor of the literary magazine Modern Poetry in Translation. He died at the age of 78, and was buried in the Brompton Cemetery in west London.

== Biography ==
Daniel Weissbort was born in London in 1935, to a Polish-Jewish family who had emigrated to England in 1933 following Hitler's accession to the German chancellorship. He was educated at St Paul's School and Queens' College, Cambridge, where he was a History Exhibitioner, graduating with a BA in 1956. In 1965, with Ted Hughes, Weissbort founded the magazine Modern Poetry in Translation (MPT) which he edited for almost 40 years. In the early 1970s, he went to the USA where he directed, for over thirty years, the Translation Workshop and MFA Program in Translation at the University of Iowa.

He was a Professor (Emeritus) of English and Comparative Literature at the University of Iowa, Research Fellow in the English Department at King's College, London University and Honorary Professor in the Centre for Translation and Comparative Cultural Studies at the University of Warwick.

In 1965, Ted Hughes founded with Daniel Weissbort the journal Modern Poetry in Translation. Weissbort and Hughes were instrumental in bringing to the English-speaking world the work of many poets who were hardly known from countries like Poland and Hungary which were controlled by the Soviet Union. This included bringing to the West the work of Czesław Miłosz, who would later go on to win the Nobel Prize in literature. Hughes wrote an introduction to a translation of Vasko Popa: Collected Poems in the Persea Series of Poetry in Translation under Daniel Weissbort, General Editor, which was reviewed favourably by literary critic John Bayley of Oxford University in The New York Review of Books.

Daniel Weissbort's anthologies of Russian poetry and of East European poetry are well known and he also published many collections of his own poetry. Anvil Press published his translational memoir of Joseph Brodsky, From Russian with Love. He co-edited, for Oxford University Press, a historical reader in translation theory, which was published in 2006. He wrote a book on Ted Hughes and translation and for Faber he edited the Selected Translations of Ted Hughes. The Guardian newspaper wrote that Weissbort founded Carcanet Press. Weissbort translated Missing Person by Patrick Modiano who received the Nobel Prize for Literature. His work Selected Poems of Nikolay Zabolotsky won the AATSEEL Best Translation into English prize in 2001.

Daniel Weissbort died in November 2013.

On the Stanford University site of The Book Haven by Cynthia Haven, in an obituary of Daniel Weissbort, Daniel Weissbort is defined as a "master translator." Also on this Stanford University web site, Weissbort is called a champion of translation. Weissbort has genius in translation, obituary of Weissbort in Translationista.

Ted Hughes has stated that "It's hard to imagine how anything could be more natural, relaxed and true to the writer's self, true to his secret, personal life, than Daniel Weissbort's poems. Maybe his many years of translating and sieving through translations of worldwide modern poetry have had something to do with it. He seems to have come out somewhere beyond poetic styles and mannerisms. His poems now have a peculiar, naked life. They move in a frankness and inner freedom and simplicity that seem to belong hardly at all to literature. Yet they leave an impression of intense patterns, a rich, artistic substance. In this new collection he has broken into new material, and brought his qualities to a pitch that will, for many of us, change the possibilities of English poetry. That's a large claim, but I think it can be made."

His brother was the painter George Weissbort.

== Publications ==
=== Poetry ===
- Letters to Ted, 2002, Anvil Press, London
- What Was All The Fuss About? 2000, Anvil Press, London
- The Leaseholder, Carcanet Press, 1971, Oxford.
- In an Emergency, Carcanet Press (UK) Dufour (USA), 1972.
- Soundings, Carcanet Press (UK), Dufour (USA), 1977.
- Leaseholder: New & Selected Poems, Carcanet Press (UK and USA), 1986.
- Fathers, Northern House, Newcastle upon Tyne, 1991.
- Inscription, Cross Cultural Communications, Merrick, New York, 1993.
- Lake: New & Selected Poems, Sheep Meadow Press, New York, 1993.
- Nietszche's Attaché Case, British edition of above, Carcanet, 1993
- Eretz Kelev (Dogland), selected poems, translated into Hebrew by Moshe Dor, Ariyeh Sivan, G. Leshem, Carmel Publishing House, Jerusalem, 1994.
- The Name's Progress, Peremena Imeni, translated into Russian by Regina Derieva, Ars Interpres, Stockholm, 2006

=== Anthologies ===
- Post-War Russian Poetry, Penguin Books (UK and USA) 1974.
- Russian Poetry: The Modern Period (with John Glad), U. of Iowa Press, 1978, Iowa City.
- Twentieth Century Russian Poetry (with John Glad), an update of Russian Poetry: The Modern Period, University of Iowa Press, 1992.
- Translating Poetry: The Double Labyrinth, (with introduction and contributions), Macmillan (UK) University of Iowa Press (USA), 1989.
- The Poetry of Survival: Post-War East European Poetry, Anvil Press (UK), St. Martin's (USA) 1992, Penguin, January 1993 (UK), April 1993 (USA).
- 20th Century Russian Poetry: Silver and Steel, selected by Yevgeny Yevtushenko (with Max Haywood and Albert C. Todd), Nan A. Talese, Doubleday (USA), 1993.
- Survival: An Experience and an Experiment in Translating Modern Hindi Poetry (with Girdhar Rathi), Sahitya Akademi, Delhi, 1994.
- Modern Russian Women's Poetry, co-editor Valentina Polukhina, University of Iowa Press, Carcanet Press.

=== Miscellaneous ===
- From Russian With Love, translator's memoir of Joseph Brodsky, Anvil, 2002
- Historical Reader in Translation Studies, co-edited with Astradur Eysteinsson, Oxford University Press, 2005/6
- Ted Hughes and Translation, Oxford University Press, 2008/9
- Selected Translations of Ted Hughes, Faber and Faber, 2007

=== Translations ===
- The Soviet People and their Society by Pierre Sorlin, Pall Mall (UK) Praeger (USA), 1968.
- Guerillas in Latin America: The Technique of the Counter-State by Luis Mercier Vega, Pall Mall (UK) Praeger (USA), 1969.
- Scrolls: Selected Poems of Nikolay Zabolotsky (with an introduction) Cape (UK) Grossman (USA), 1970.
- A History of the People's Democracies: Eastern Europe since Stalin by François Fejtö, Pall Mall (UK) Praeger (USA), 1971.
- The Trial of the Four: A Collection of Materials in the Case of Galanskov, Ginzburg, Dobrovolsky and Lashkova, 1967–68 compiled by Pavel Litvinov, (with Janis Sapiets and Hilary Sternberg), Longman (UK) Viking (USA), 1971.
- Natalya Gorbanevskaya: Selected Poems with a Transcript of her Trial and Papers Relating to her Detention in a Prison Psychiatric Hospital (with an introduction), Carcanet Pres (UK) Dufour (USA), 1972.
- Nose! Nose? No-se! and Other Plays by Andrei Amalrik (with an introduction), Harcourt Brace (USA), 1972.
- The Rare and Extraordinary History of Holy Russia by Gustave Doré, Alcove Press (UK) Library Press (USA), 1972.
- The War is Over, Selected Poems of Evgeny Vinokurov (with Anthony Rudolf), Carcanet (UK) International Writing Program (USA), 1976.
- East-West & Is Uncle Jack a Conformist by Andrei Amalrik (with an introduction), Eyre Methuen (UK), 1976.
- From the Night and Other Poems by Lev Mak (with an introduction), Ardis and International Writing Program (USA), 1978.
- Ivan the Terrible and Ivan the Fool (with an introduction), Gollancz (UK) Richard Marek (USA), 1979.
- Missing Person by Patrick Modiano, Cape (UK) 1980.
- The World About Us by Claude Simon, Ontario Review Press (USA), 1983.
- Red Knight: Serbian Women's Songs (with Tomislav Longinovic), Menard/King's College (UK), 1992.
- The Jews and Germany, by Enzo Traverso (with a Translator's preface), University of Nebraska Press, 1995.
- Five Russian Women Poets, Carcanet press, Manchester (UK), forthcoming.
- Selected Poems of Nikolay Zabolotsky, Carcanet Press, Manchester (UK), 1999
- Selected Poetry of Yehuda Amichai, co-editor Ted Hughes, Faber, 2001
- Far from Sodom, Selected Poems of Inna Lisnyanskaya, Arc Publications, UK, 2005
- The sum total of violations, Selected Poems of Regina Derieva (with an introduction), Arc Publications, UK, 2009
