= Missing Person (novel) =

1978 novel by Patrick Modiano

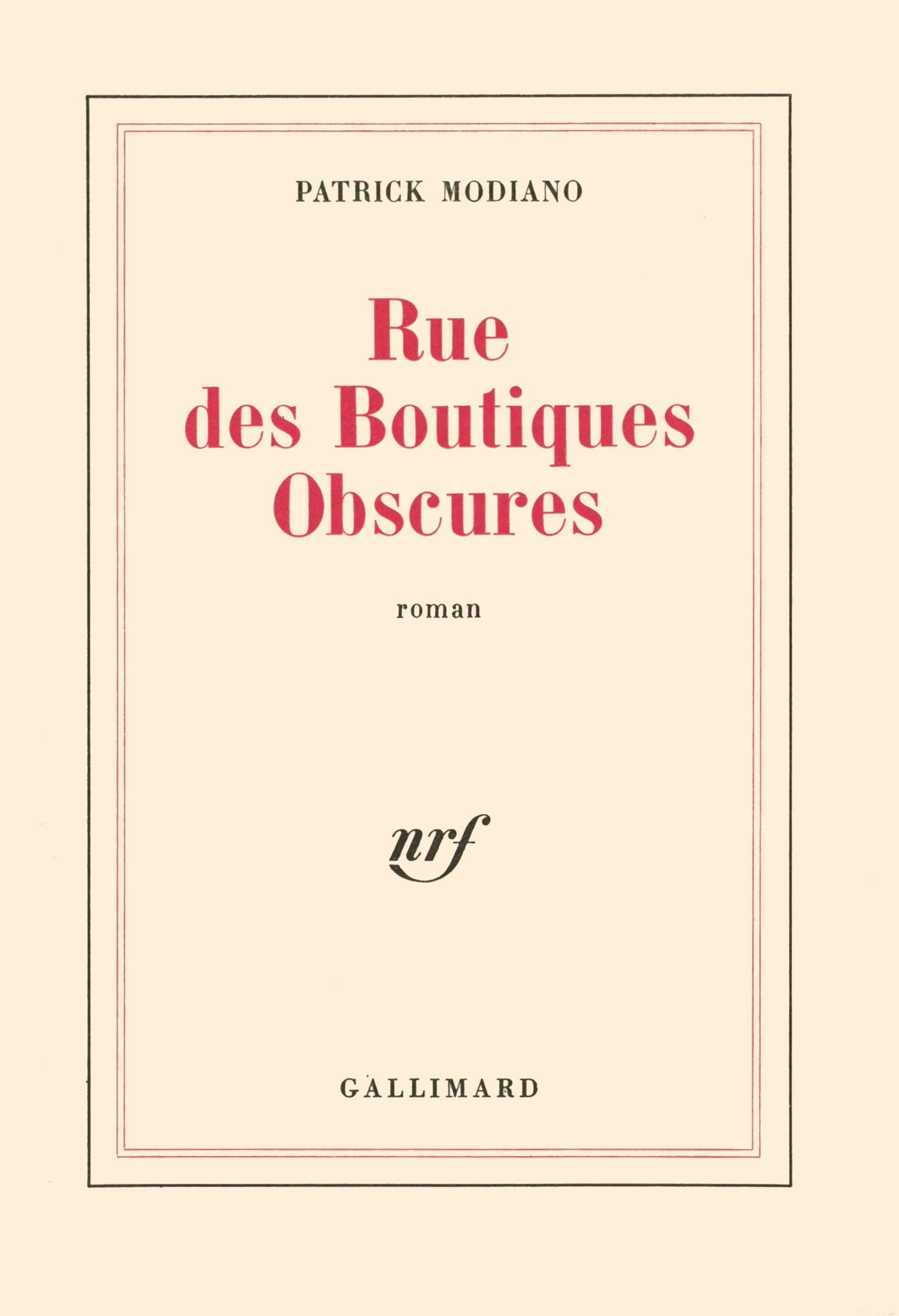
- Collection Blanche cover (first edition)
- Author: Patrick Modiano
- Original title: Rue des Boutiques Obscures
- Translator: Daniel Weissbort
- Language: French
- Published: 1978 (Éditions Gallimard)
- Publication place: France
- English publication date: 1980 (Jonathan Cape)
- Awards: Prix Goncourt
- ISBN: 2070283836 (French 1st ed.); 0224017896 (English 1st ed.)

Missing Person (French: Rue des Boutiques Obscures) is the sixth novel by French writer Patrick Modiano, published on 5 September 1978. In the same year it was awarded the Prix Goncourt. The English translation by Daniel Weissbort was published in 1980. Rue des Boutiques Obscures (lit. 'The Street Of Dark Shops') is the name of a street in Rome (La Via delle Botteghe Oscure) where one of the characters lived, and where Modiano himself lived for some time.

On 9 October 2014, Patrick Modiano was awarded the Nobel Prize in Literature.

== Plot summary ==
Guy Roland is an amnesiac detective who lost his memory ten years before the beginning of the story, which opens in 1965. When his employer, Hutte, retires and closes the detective agency where he has worked for eight years, Roland embarks on a search for his own identity. His investigations uncover clues to a life that seems to stop during the Second World War. It seems that he is Jimmy Pedro Stern, a Greek Jew from Salonica, who was living in Paris under an assumed name, Pedro McEvoy, and working for the legation of the Dominican Republic. He and several friends (Denise Coudreuse, a French model who shares his life; Freddie Howard Luz, a British citizen originally from Mauritius; Gay Orlov, an American dancer of Russian origin; and André Wildmer, an English former jockey, all of whom are enemy nationals) went to Megève to escape a Paris that had become dangerous for them during the German occupation. Denise and Pedro attempted to flee to Switzerland, and paid a smuggler who abandoned them in the mountains, separating them and leaving them lost in the snow.

Having partially recovered his memory, Guy Roland goes to look for Freddie, who went to live in Polynesia after the war. When he arrives in Bora Bora, he learns that Freddie has disappeared, either lost at sea or by choice. At the end of the novel he is about to follow the last clue that remains to his past: an address in the Via della Botteghe Oscure in Rome, where Jimmy Pedro Stern is recorded as having lived in the 1930s.

== Characters ==
- Guy Roland - The story's protagonist. He lost his memory during the war. He works as a private detective and tries to recover his past throughout the novel.
- Constantin van Hutte - The head of the detective agency who gives Guy his new identity. He retires to Nice early in the story.
- Paul Sonachidtze - Guy's starting point on his journey.
- Jean Heurteur - A restaurateur and friend of Sonachidze's.
- Mr. Styoppa de Dzhagorev - A Russian immigrant.
- Gay Orlov - Another Russian immigrant. Died of a drug overdose.
- Waldo Blunt - The pianist husband of Gay Orlov.
- Claude Howard de Luz - Cousin of Freddie Howard de Luz.
- Freddie (Alfred Jean) Howard de Luz - friend of Pedro. A confidant of John Gilbert. Second husband of Gay Orlov.
- Robert - Groundskeeper of the Howard de Luz estate.
- Denise Coudreuse - French model and the protagonist's wife, married April 3, 1939 (p. 79 and p. 120 of Weissbort translation).

== Reception ==
At the time of publication, French reviews considered Rue des Boutiques Obscures to be Modiano’s best novel to date and praised the author for his economic style comparable to Kafka or Camus’ The Stranger. As well as winning the Goncourt, the novel won le Prix des Détectives. Missing Person can be considered Modiano’s best known work in the English world and has also been described as ‘quintessential Modiano’ and the best book to start with the author.

== Editions ==
- Rue des boutiques obscures, « Blanche » collection, Gallimard, 1978, (ISBN 2070283836)
- Rue des boutiques obscures, « Folio » collection, Gallimard (nº 1358), 1982, (ISBN 2070373584)
- Missing Person, translated by Daniel Weissbort, Jonathan Cape, 1980 (ISBN 0224017896); David R. Godine, 2004 (ISBN 1567922813)
- Rue des boutiques obscures, « Folio » collection, Gallimard, 2014, (ISBN 9782070373581)
