= Marie Modiano =

French singer and writer (born 1978)

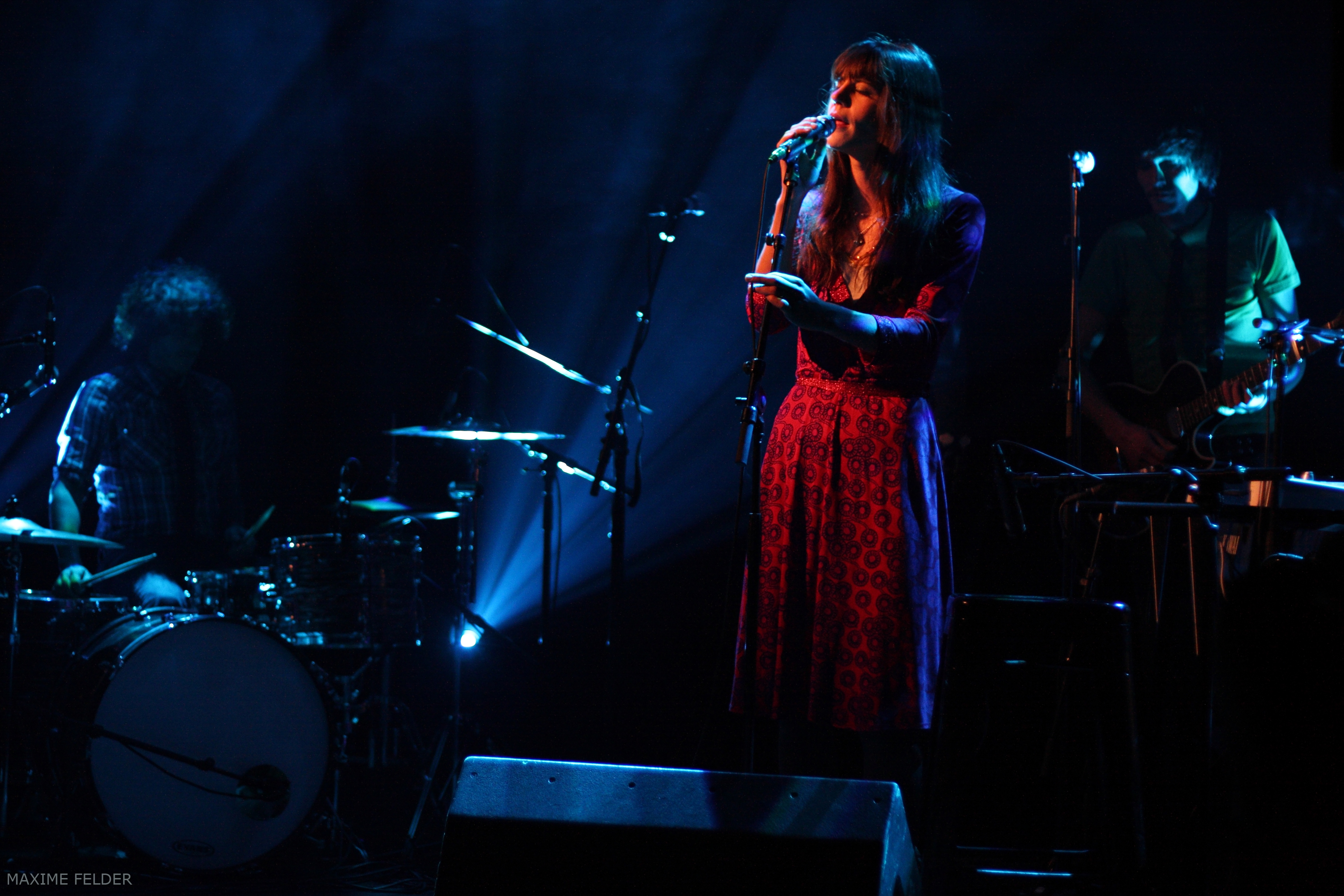
Marie Modiano during a concert in 2009

Marie Modiano (French pronunciation: [maʁi mɔdjano]; born 1 September 1978) is a French singer and writer.

== Biography ==
Marie Modiano was born on 1 September 1978 in Paris and is the second daughter of Dominique Zehrfuss and literature Nobel Prize winner Patrick Modiano and the sister of film director Zina Modiano. She was raised in Paris and studied acting at the Royal Academy of Dramatic Art in London. After studying acting – with a supporting role in the French film La vie privée (2007) directed by her sister and the role of Ismène in the play Phèdre directed by Luc Bondy (she acted in the play during a tour in Europe, United States and Japan) —, she is now a lyricist, composer and singer. Her first album I'm Not a Rose, created by composer Grégoire Hetzel was released in 2006 by Naïve. Outland, her second album was issued in 2008. In 2012 Éditions Gallimard published her book of poetry entitled Espérance mathématique. In spring 2013, Marie Modiano announced the release of two albums, Ram on a Flag and Espérance Mathématique – the second album being her poetry set to music by her life partner Peter von Poehl – as well as her first novel Upsilon Scorpii.

== Albums ==
- 2006: I'm Not a Rose
- 2008: Outland
- 2013: Ram on a Flag
- 2013: Espérance mathématique
- 2018: Pauvre chanson
- 2021: Songs from the Other Side (with Peter von Poehl)

== Literary works ==
- 2012: 28 paradis, 28 enfers in collaboration with Patrick Modiano and Dominique Zerfhuss (texts and drawings)
- 2012: Espérance mathématique (poetry) ISBN 978-2-07-013684-1
- 2013: Upsilon Scorpii (novel) ISBN 978-2-07-014286-6
