= La Place de l'Étoile (novel) =

Novel written by Patrick Modiano

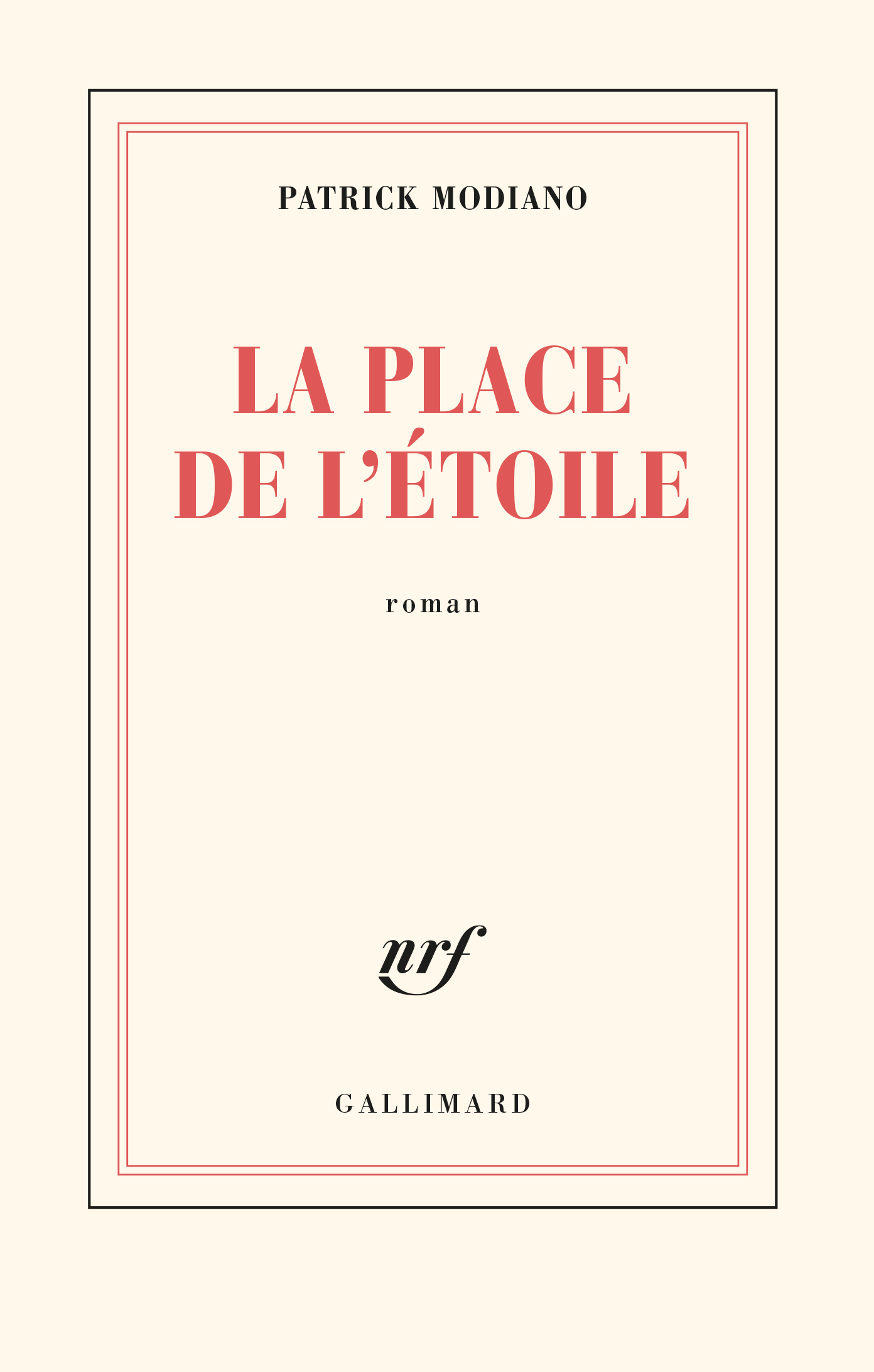
Collection Blanche cover (first edition)

La Place de l'Étoile is the first novel of the French writer Patrick Modiano. It was published by Gallimard in 1968 and won the Roger Nimier Prize and Fénéon Prize.

The novel, which draws on elements of autobiography, recounts the story of Raphael Schlemilovitch, a French Jew born just after the war, who is haunted by the war and by thoughts of persecution. The hero, who is also the narrator, tells the story in a hallucinatory manner, mixing reality and fictitious personal inventions.

He first presents himself as an antisemitic Jew belonging to the French Gestapo living in Geneva who becomes friends with Des Essarts, a French aristocrat, and Maurice Sachs, who has miraculously reappeared (Maurice Sachs was a real person, but deceased by the time of the narration). After their abrupt disappearance, he reconnects with his father, a Jewish industrialist living in New York, and gives him his entire fortune which he had previously inherited from an uncle from Venezuela. He then enrolls in an academic preparatory school (a "khâgne") in Bordeaux, where he is influenced by M. Debigorre, professor of literature, former Pétainist, who is harassed by his students, and whom the narrator successfully defends against them. He then meets Levy-Vendome, a Jewish aristocrat who is in the business of sex slave trafficking and with whom he signs on as an associate in order to kidnap young women according to specifications. By virtue of his athletic good looks, his stature and his physical strength, he is able to seduce and capture and deliver to employer several women from the French provinces, first in Savoy and then in Normandy. He then flees to Vienna, where he becomes a pimp, believing himself to be the "official Jew" of the third Reich, friend of Heydrich, the official pimp of the SS and lover of Eva Braun. We next see him in Israel in a reeducation camp that very much resembles a concentration camp where the Israeli army "reforms" European Jews into good Israelis, freed from their obsessions over Jewish misfortune, Jewish thought and Jewish intelligence. But all this appears to be simply an illusion because after a final scene where all the characters reappear, we find Schlemilovitch on a couch in Vienna in the process of being psychoanalyzed by a doctor whom he takes to be doctor Freud.

The title is a play on words, reflecting both the star that Jews were forced to wear under Nazi rule (French l’étoile jaune) and Place de l'Étoile, the traffic circle around the Arc de Triomphe in Paris. In French, the word 'place' can mean both a place (a location, in this sense specifically the location where something belongs) and a square (a piazza, plaza — an open space between houses and streets), so the title of the book can be understood as both "The Square named Étoile" and "The Place where the [yellow] star belongs".

== Editions ==
- La Place de l'Étoile, « Blanche » collection, Gallimard, 1968 (ISBN 9782070272136)
- La Place de l'Étoile, « Folio » collection, Gallimard (nº 698), 1975 (ISBN 9782070366989)
- La Place de l'Étoile, translated by Frank Wynne, Bloomsbury, 2016 (ISBN 9781408867952)
