= Patrick Modiano =

French novelist (born 1945)

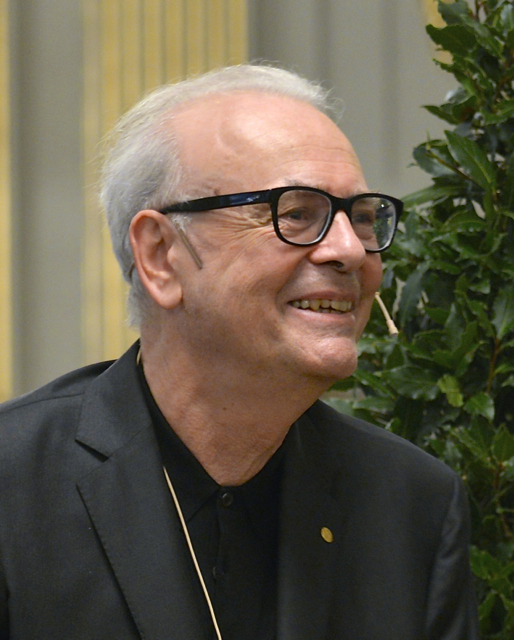
- Modiano in 2014
- Born: Jean Patrick Modiano; 30 July 1945 (age 81); Boulogne-Billancourt, France
- Occupation: Novelist
- Spouse: Dominique Zehrfuss
- Children: Zina Modiano; Marie Modiano
- Writing career
- Language: French
- Genre: Novels
- Notable awards: Grand Prix du roman de l'Académie française (1972); Prix Goncourt (1978); Prix mondial Cino Del Duca (2010); Austrian State Prize for European Literature (2012); Nobel Prize in Literature (2014)

Jean Patrick Modiano (French: [ʒɑ̃ patʁik mɔdjano]; born 30 July 1945), generally known as Patrick Modiano, is a French novelist and recipient of the 2014 Nobel Prize in Literature. He is a noted writer of autofiction, the blend of autobiography and historical fiction.

In more than 40 books, Modiano has used his fascination with the human experience of World War II in France to examine individual and collective identities, responsibilities, loyalties, memory, and loss. Because of his obsession with the past, and precisely, his own family's past, he is sometimes compared to Marcel Proust. Modiano's works have been translated into more than 30 languages and have been celebrated in and around France, but most of his novels had not been translated into English before he was awarded the Nobel Prize.

Modiano previously won the 2012 Austrian State Prize for European Literature, the 2010 Prix mondial Cino Del Duca from the Institut de France for lifetime achievement, the 1978 Prix Goncourt for Rue des boutiques obscures, and the 1972 Grand Prix du roman de l'Académie française for Les Boulevards de ceinture.

== Early and personal life ==
Jean Patrick Modiano was born in Boulogne-Billancourt, a commune in the western suburbs of Paris on July 30, 1945. His father, Albert Modiano (1912–77, born in Paris), was of Jewish-Italian origin; on his paternal side he was descended from the well known Italo-Jewish Modiano family of Thessaloniki, Greece. His mother, Louisa Colpeyn (1918–2015), was a Flemish actress. Modiano's parents met in occupied Paris during World War II and began their relationship semi-clandestinely (they separated shortly after Patrick's birth). His father had refused to wear the yellow badge that Jews were required to wear and did not turn himself in when Paris Jews were rounded up for deportation to Nazi concentration camps. He was picked up in February 1942, and narrowly missed deportation, thanks to a friend's intervention. During the war years Albert did business on the black market and was allegedly associated with the Carlingue, the Gestapo's French auxiliaries which recruited its leaders from the underworld. Albert Modiano never clearly spoke of this period to his son before his death in 1977.

Patrick Modiano's childhood took place in a unique atmosphere. He was initially brought up by his maternal grandparents who taught him Flemish as his first language. The absence of his father, and frequently also of his mother who went on tour, brought him closer to his brother, Rudy, who was two years younger and died of a disease at age 9. Patrick Modiano dedicated his works from 1967 to 1982 to Rudy. Recalling this tragic period in his memoir Un Pedigree (2005), Modiano said: "I couldn't write an autobiography, that's why I called it a 'pedigree': It's a book less on what I did than on what others, mainly my parents, did to me."

As a child, Modiano studied at the École du Montcel primary school in Jouy-en-Josas, at the Collège Saint-Joseph de Thônes in Haute-Savoie, and then at the Lycée Henri-IV high school in Paris. While he was at Henri-IV, he took geometry lessons from writer Raymond Queneau, who was a friend of Modiano's mother. He received his baccalauréat in Annecy in 1964. His father enrolled him in hypokhâgne against his will and he soon stopped attending classes. In 1965, he enrolled at the Sorbonne to qualify for a college deferment from the military draft, but did not obtain a degree.

== Marriage and family ==
In 1970, Modiano married Dominique Zehrfuss. In a 2003 interview with Elle, she said: "I have a catastrophic memory of the day of our marriage. It rained. A real nightmare. Our groomsmen were Queneau, who had mentored Patrick since his adolescence, and Malraux, a friend of my father. They started to argue about Dubuffet, and it was like we were watching a tennis match! That said, it would have been funny to have some photos, but the only person who had a camera forgot to bring the film. There is only one photo remaining of us, from behind and under an umbrella!" They had two daughters, Zina (1974) and Marie (1978).

== Writing career ==
His meeting with Queneau, author of Zazie dans le métro, was crucial. It was Queneau who introduced Modiano to the literary world, giving him the opportunity to attend a cocktail party thrown by his future publisher Éditions Gallimard. In 1968 at the age of 22, Modiano published his first book La Place de l'Étoile, a wartime novel about a Jewish collaborator, after having read the manuscript to Queneau. The novel displeased his father so much that he tried to buy all existing copies of the book. Earlier (1959) while stranded in London, Modiano had called his father to request a little financial assistance, but his father had rebuffed him. Another time (1965), his mother sent Patrick to the father's apartment to demand a tardy child-support payment, and in response the father's girlfriend called the police. From his first novel, which was awarded the Fénéon Prize and Roger Nimier Prize, Modiano has written about "the pull of the past, the threat of disappearance, the blurring of moral boundaries, 'the dark side of the soul.'"

The 2010 release of the German translation of La Place de l'Étoile won Modiano the German Preis der SWR-Bestenliste (Prize of the Southwest Radio Best-of List) from the Südwestrundfunk radio station, which hailed the book as a major post-Holocaust work. La Place de l'Étoile was published in English in August 2015 together with two other of Modiano's wartime novels, under the title, The Occupation Trilogy.

In 1973, Modiano co-wrote the screenplay of Lacombe, Lucien with Louis Malle who directed the film. It focuses on a young french man joining the fascist Milice after being denied admission to the French Resistance. The film caused controversy due to the lack of justification of the main character's political involvement.

Modiano's novels all delve into the puzzle of identity, and of trying to track evidence of existence through the traces of the past. Obsessed with the troubled and shameful period of the Occupation—during which his father had allegedly engaged in shady dealings—Modiano returns to this theme in all of his novels, book after book building a remarkably homogeneous work. "After each novel, I have the impression that I have cleared it all away," he says. "But I know I'll come back over and over again to tiny details, little things that are part of what I am. In the end, we are all determined by the place and the time in which we were born." He writes constantly about the city of Paris, describing the evolution of its streets, its habits and its people.

All of Modiano's works are written from a place of "mania". In Rue des Boutiques obscures (published in English as Missing Person), the protagonist suffers from amnesia and travels from Polynesia to Rome in an effort to reconnect with his past. The novel addresses the never-ending search for identity in a world where "the sand holds the traces of our footsteps but a few moments". In "Remise de Peine", Patrick Modiano evokes his youth in the underworld of the fifties, and among other things, his meeting with Frede, a real character who was one of Marlene Dietrich's lovers. In Du plus loin de l'oubli (Out of the Dark), the narrator recalls his shadowy love affair in 1960s Paris and London with an enigmatic woman. Fifteen years after their breakup, they meet again, but she has changed her name and initially denies their past relationship. Two of postwar London's more notorious true-life characters, Peter Rachman and Emil Savundra, befriend the narrator. What is real and what is not remain to be seen in the dreamlike novel that typifies Modiano's obsessions and elegiac prose.

The theme of memory is most clearly at play in Dora Bruder (entitled The Search Warrant in some English-language translations). Dora Bruder is a literary hybrid, fusing together several genres — biography, autobiography, detective novel — to tell the history of its title character, a 15-year-old daughter of Eastern European Jewish immigrants, who, after running away from the safety of the convent that was hiding her, ends up being deported to Auschwitz. As Modiano explains in the opening of his novel, he first became interested in Dora's story when he came across her name in a missing persons headline in a December 1941 edition of the French newspaper Paris Soir. Prompted by his own passion for the past, Modiano went to the listed address, and from there began his investigation, his search for memories. He wrote by piecing together newspaper cuttings, vague testimonies and old telephone directories, looking at outsider living on the outskirts of the city. Various documents concerning Dora were subsequently communicated to Modiano by the lawyer Serge Klasfeld, who had used them in his "Memorial to the Deportation of the Jews of France". Regarding Dora Bruder, he wrote: "I shall never know how she spent her days, where she hid, in whose company she passed the winter months of her first escape, or the few weeks of spring when she escaped for the second time. That is her secret." Modiano's quiet, austere novels, which also include La Ronde de nuit, are described as reading like "compassionate, regretful thrillers."

Modiano's 2007 novel Dans le café de la jeunesse perdue is set in 1960s Paris where a group of people, including a detective of shady background, wonder what is or was the matter with a certain young woman called Louki, who, we are told on the last page, ended her life by throwing herself out a window. Even though there are plenty of geographical details, the reader is left with a sense of vagueness as to what happened and when. For the first time throughout his oeuvre, Modiano uses various narrators who relate from their point of view what they think they know about the woman. In the third of five chapters, the protagonist herself relates episodes from her life, but she remains difficult to grasp. The author creates a number of instabilities on various levels of his text and this signifies how literary figures can(not) be created. The protagonist evades being grasped.

In Modiano's 26th book, L'Horizon (2011), the narrator, Jean Bosmans, a fragile man pursued by his mother's ghost, dwells on his youth and the people he has lost. Among them is the enigmatic Margaret Le Coz, a young woman whom he met and fell in love with in the 1960s. The two loners spent several weeks wandering the winding streets of a now long-forgotten Paris, fleeing a phantom menace. One day, however, without notice, Margaret boarded a train and vanished into the void—but not from Jean's memory. Forty years later, he is ready to look for his vanished love. The novel not only epitomizes Modiano's style and concerns but also marks a new step in his personal quest, after a mysterious walkabout in Berlin. "The city is my age," he says, describing Berlin which is almost a completely new city rebuilt from the ashes of war. "Its long, geometric avenues still bear the marks of history. But if you look at it right, you can still spot ancient wastelands beneath the concrete. These are the very roots of my generation." Besson remarks that such symbolic roots gave rise, over the years, "to one of the most wonderful trees in French literature."

Modiano is also one of the 8 members of the jury of the French literary award Prix Contrepoint.

Modiano has also written children's books.

== Nobel Prize in Literature ==
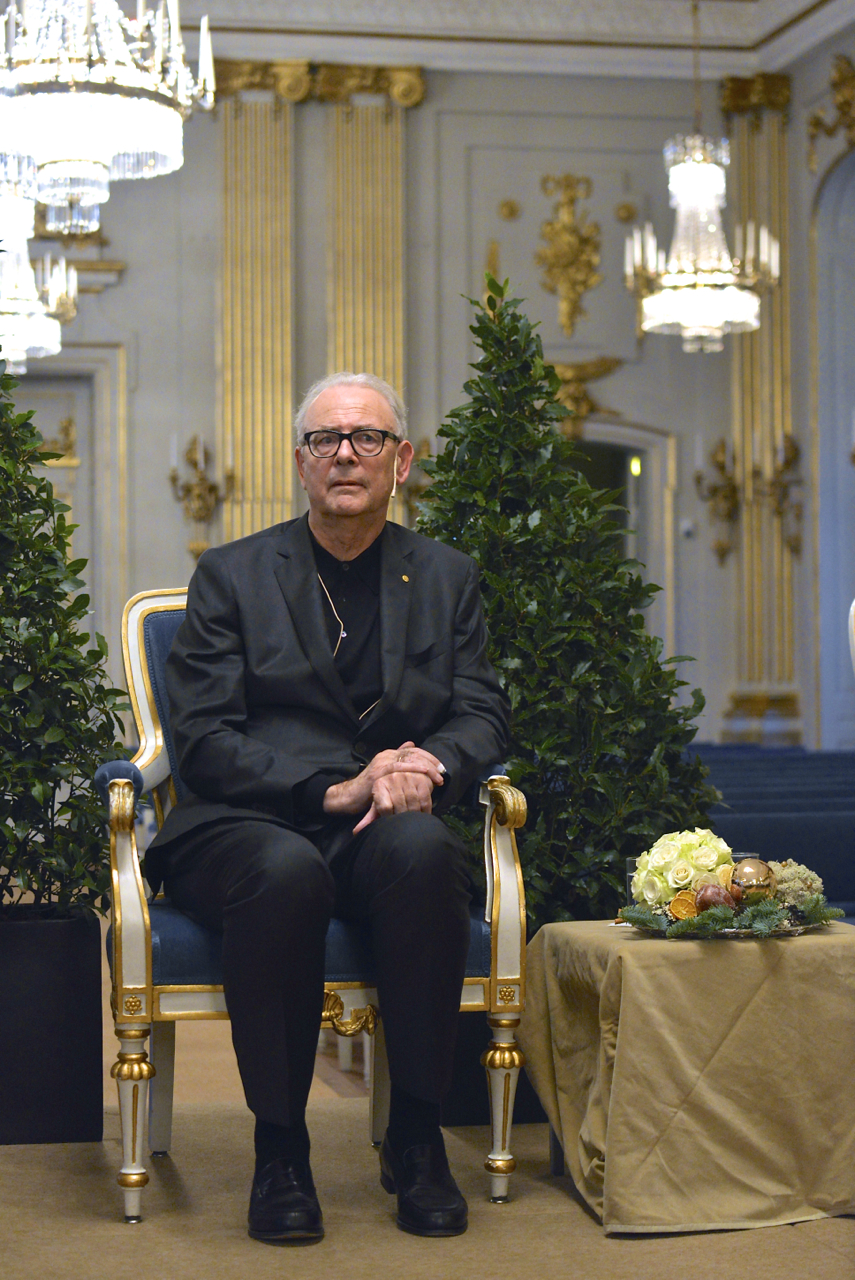
Patrick Modiano at the press conference in Stockholm, 6 December 2014

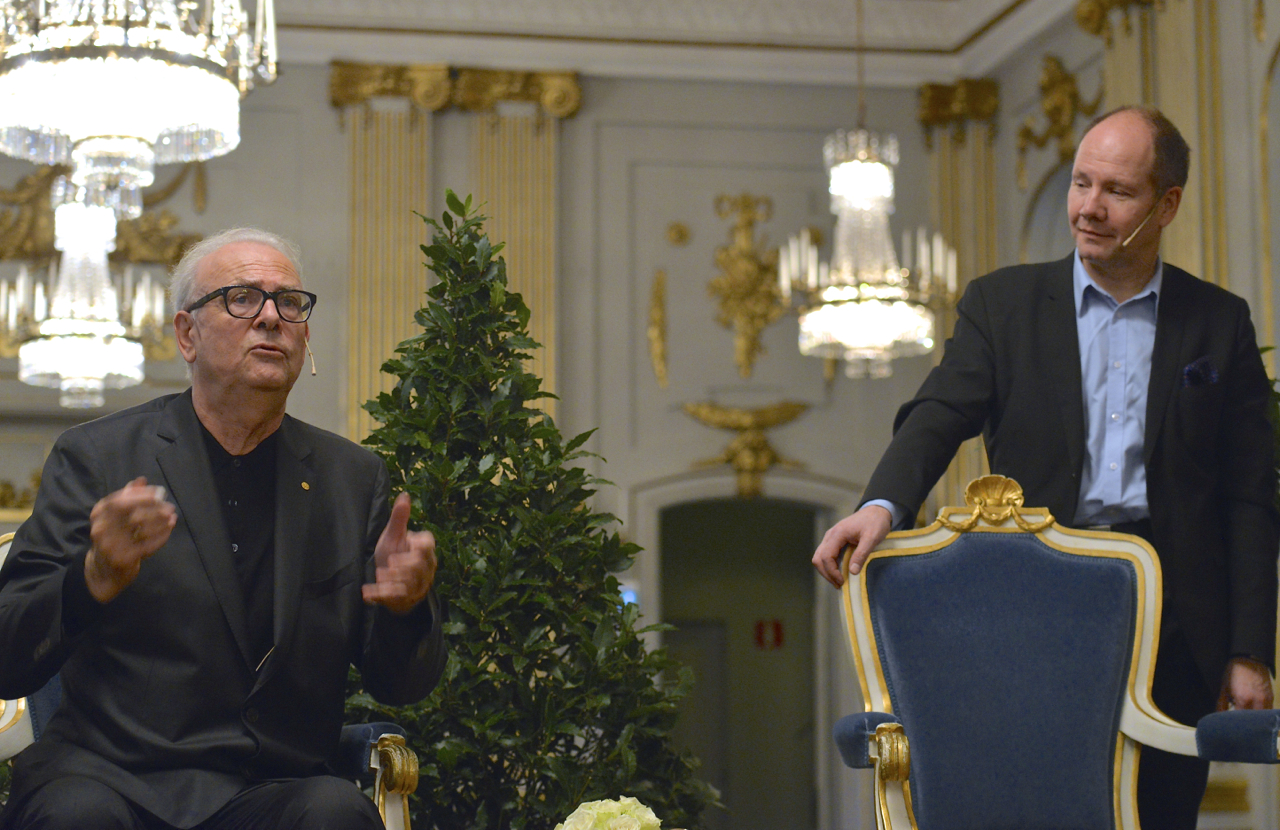
Patrick Modiano with Peter Englund, permanent secretary of the Swedish Academy at the press conference.

On 9 October 2014, the Swedish Academy announced that that year's Nobel Prize in Literature was awarded to Patrick Modiano "for the art of memory with which he has evoked the most ungraspable human destinies and uncovered the life-world of the occupation." Modiano was the 15th French writer to be awarded the prize.

Though Modiano was the fourth favourite on Ladbrokes to win the 2014 Nobel Prize, the choice of Modiano was described as unexpected. Modiano himself found it unexpected, but said he was "touched" by the recognition.

At the award ceremony in Stockholm on 10 December 2014, Jesper Svenbro of the Swedish Academy said:

In novel upon novel Modiano has developed his ability to use almost non-existent documentation – old telephone numbers, street addresses – to endow the past with entrancing life and his Parisian cityscape with a singular voice. Magnificently, his work instantiates what an earlier Nobel Laureate, Seamus Heaney, called “the poetry of place”.

== Awards and honors ==
- 1968: Prix Roger-Nimier and the Prix Fénéon for La Place de l'Étoile
- 1972: Grand prix du roman de l'Académie française for Les Boulevards de ceinture
- 1976: Prix des libraires for Villa Triste
- 1978: Prix Goncourt for Rue des Boutiques obscures
- 1984: Prix littéraire Prince-Pierre-de-Monaco for his body of work
- 1990: Prix Relay for Voyage de noces
- 2000: Grand prix de littérature Paul-Morand for his body of work
- 2002: Prix Jean-Monnet de littérature européenne du département de Charente for La Petite Bijou
- 2010: Prix mondial Cino Del Duca for his body of work
- 2011: Prix de la BnF and the Prix Marguerite-Duras for his body of work
- 2012: Austrian State Prize for European Literature
- 2014: Nobel Prize in Literature

== Bibliography ==
=== Novels and novellas ===
- La Place de l'Étoile (1968). La Place de l'Étoile, trans. Frank Wynne (Bloomsbury, 2015).
- La Ronde de nuit (1969). Night Rounds, trans. Patricia Wolf (Alfred A. Knopf, 1971); revised by Frank Wynne as The Night Watch (Bloomsbury, 2015).
- Les Boulevards de ceinture (1972). Ring Roads, trans. Caroline Hillier (Gollancz, 1974); revised by Frank Wynne (Bloomsbury, 2015).
- Villa Triste (1975). Villa Triste, trans. Caroline Hillier (Gollancz, 1977); also by John Cullen (Other Press, 2016)
- Livret de famille (1977). Family Record, trans. Mark Polizzotti (Yale University Press, 2019).
- Rue des Boutiques obscures (1978). Missing Person, trans. Daniel Weissbort (London: Jonathan Cape, 1980)
- Une jeunesse (1981). Young Once, trans. Damion Searls (New York Review Books, 2016).
- Memory Lane (1981). With drawings by Pierre Le-Tan.
- De si braves garçons (1982). Such Fine Boys, trans. Mark Polizzotti (Yale University Press, 2017).
- Quartier Perdu (1984). A Trace of Malice, trans. Anthea Bell (Aidan Ellis, 1988).
- Dimanches d'août (1986). Sundays in August, trans. Damion Searls (Yale University Press, 2017).
- Catherine Certitude (1988). Catherine Certitude, trans. William Rodarmor (David R. Godine, 2000) with illustrations by Sempé.
- Remise de peine (1988). Suspended Sentences, in Suspended Sentences: Three Novellas.
- Vestiaire de l'enfance (1989)
- Voyage de noces (1990) Honeymoon, trans. Barbara Wright (London: Harvill / HarperCollins, 1992).
- Fleurs de ruine (1991). Flowers of Ruin, in Suspended Sentences: Three Novellas.
- Un cirque passe (1992). After the Circus, trans. Mark Polizzotti (Yale University Press, 2015).
- Chien de printemps (1993). Afterimage, in Suspended Sentences: Three Novellas.
- Du plus loin de l'oubli (1995). Out of the Dark, trans. Jordan Stump (Bison Books, 1998).
- Dora Bruder (1997) trans. Joanna Kilmartin (University of California Press, 1999), also as The Search Warrant (London: Random House / Boston: Harvill Press, 2000).
- Des inconnues (1999)
- La Petite Bijou (2001). Little Jewel, trans. Penny Hueston (Yale University Press, 2016)
- Accident nocturne (2003). Paris Nocturne, trans. Phoebe Weston-Evans (Yale University Press, 2015).
- Un pedigree (2004). Pedigree: A Memoir, trans. Mark Polizzotti (Yale University Press, 2015).
- Dans le café de la jeunesse perdue (2007). In the Café of Lost Youth, trans. Euan Cameron (Quercus, 2016), as well as Chris Clarke (New York Review Books, 2016).
- L'Horizon (2010)
- L'Herbe des nuits (2012). The Black Notebook, trans. Mark Polizzotti (Mariner Books, 2016).
- Pour que tu ne te perdes pas dans le quartier (2014). So You Don't Get Lost in the Neighborhood, trans. Euan Cameron (Houghton Mifflin Harcourt, 2015).
- Souvenirs dormants (Gallimard, 2017). Sleep of Memory, trans. Mark Polizzotti (Yale University Press, 2018).
- Encre sympathique (Gallimard, 2019). Invisible Ink, trans. Mark Polizzotti (Yale University Press, 2020).
- Chevreuse (Gallimard, 2021). Scene of the Crime, trans. Mark Polizzotti (Yale University Press, 2023).
- La Danseuse (Gallimard, 2023). Ballerina, trans. Mark Polizzotti (Yale University Press, 2025).

=== Screenplays ===
- Lacombe, Lucien (1974). Screenplay co-written with Louis Malle; English translation: Lacombe, Lucien: The Complete Scenario of the Film (New York: Viking, 1975)
- Le Fils de Gascogne, directed by Pascal Aubier (1995)
- Bon Voyage (with Jean-Paul Rappeneau), 2003

=== Compilations ===
- Romans (2013). Contains a foreword by the author, some photos of people and documents, and the following 10 novels: Villa Triste, Livret de famille, Rue des Boutiques Obscures, Remise de peine, Chien de printemps, Dora Bruder, Accident nocturne, Un pedigree, Dans le café de la jeunesse perdue and L'Horizon.
- Suspended Sentences: Three Novellas, trans. by Mark Polizzotti (Yale University Press, 2014). Includes Afterimage, Suspended Sentences, and Flowers of Ruin.
- The Occupation Trilogy: La Place de l'Étoile, The Night Watch, Ring Roads (Bloomsbury USA, 2015). Trans. Caroline Hillier, Patricia Wolf and Frank Wynne.

== Adaptations ==
- Une jeunesse (from the novel of same title), directed by Moshé Mizrahi, 1983
- Le Parfum d'Yvonne (from the novel Villa Triste), directed by Patrice Leconte, 1994
- Te quiero, directed by Manuel Poirier (from the novel Dimanches d'août), 2001
- Charell, directed by Mikhaël Hers, moyen-métrage (from the novel De si braves garçons), 2006

== See also ==
- List of Jewish Nobel laureates
