= List of Sharpe series characters =

Sharpe is a series of historical fiction stories by Bernard Cornwell centred on the character of Richard Sharpe. Cornwell's series (composed of several novels and short stories) charts Sharpe's progress in the British Army during the Napoleonic Wars.

Director Tom Clegg filmed the television series Sharpe, based on the novels by Bernard Cornwell, starring Sean Bean as Sharpe. The series originally ran from 1993 to 1997. In 2006, ITV premiered Sharpe's Challenge, a two-part adventure loosely based on his time in India, with Sean Bean continuing his role as Sharpe.

In both the novels and television series, Sharpe encounters many characters, some real and some fictional. Below are some of the characters mentioned in the novels by Cornwell and the television series directed by Clegg.

== Richard Sharpe ==
Richard Sharpe
- First appearance: Sharpe's Tiger (novels) Sharpe's Rifles (series)
- Last appearance: Sharpe's Devil (novels) Sharpe's Peril (series)
- Created by: Bernard Cornwell
- Portrayed by: Sean Bean

In-universe information
- Alias: Dick Vaughn
- Nicknames: Dick, Sharpie
- Title: Lieutenant Colonel (highest rank)
- Occupation: Thief; soldier; farmer; rifleman
- Family: Father, unknown; mother, a prostitute
- Spouses: Teresa Moreno a.k.a. La Aguja; Jane Gibbons; Lucille Castineau (common-law)
- Children: Antonia (with Teresa Moreno); Patrick-Henri Lassan (with Lucille Castineau); Dominique Lassan (with Lucille Castineau)
- Nationality: English

Richard Sharpe first appears in Sharpe's Tiger as a private in the 33rd Regiment of Foot. He later earns the rank of sergeant by the end of the book. He soon gains promotion to Ensign in the 74th Regiment but is then transferred to the newly formed 95th Rifles as a second lieutenant during Sharpe's Trafalgar. He is gradually promoted through the ranks, finally becoming a lieutenant colonel in Sharpe's Waterloo.

The stories dramatise Sharpe's struggle for acceptance and respect from his fellow officers and from the men he commands. Sharpe was born as a guttersnipe in the rookeries of London but grew up in Yorkshire. He joined the army at an early age to avoid the penalty of crime.

He is a good soldier and his abilities resulted in him being commissioned as an officer on the battlefield. He overcomes class in an army where an officer's rank is often bought. Unlike many of the officers with whom he serves, Sharpe is an experienced soldier.

Sharpe is described as "brilliant but wayward" in Sharpe's Sword, and is portrayed by the author as a "loose cannon". A highly skilled leader of light troops, he takes part in a range of historical events during the Napoleonic Wars and other conflicts, including the Battle of Waterloo. The earliest books chronologically (they were published in non-chronological order) are set in India, and chronicle Sharpe's years in the ranks and as an ensign. He is known as a dangerous man to have as an enemy; he is a skilled marksman and grows to be a good swordsman. In most of the novels he is a rifle officer, armed with a 1796 pattern heavy cavalry sword and Baker rifle, although by Sharpe's Waterloo he has also acquired a pistol.

Sharpe's first command comes about through misfortune in Sharpe's Rifles. He finds himself in command of fifty riflemen after Sharpe's battalion, acting as rearguard to the army, are cut down by a squadron of French regular cavalry. The small band of surviving riflemen (from the 95th Rifles) join with Spanish major Don Blas Vivar, not realizing at first that he has his own agenda. They try to stir the Spanish in the city of Santiago de Compostela to fight for the cause of Spain against Napoleon.

In Sharpe's Eagle, Sharpe and his thirty-odd surviving riflemen are attached to the Light Company of the South Essex. It is with the South Essex, later named The Prince of Wales' Own Volunteers, that Sharpe spends the rest of his army career until he attains the rank of Lieutenant Colonel in Sharpe's Waterloo.

He is described as being six feet tall, having an angular, tanned face, long black hair and blue eyes. His most obvious physical characteristic is a deep scar on his right cheek, which pulls his right eye in such a way as to give his face a mocking expression when relaxed, but which disappears when he smiles, which is not too frequently. By the end of the series he has had three children and two wives, although not at the same time.

== 95th Rifles ==
=== Bradshaw ===
Bradshaw
- First appearance: Sharpe's Gold (series)
- Last appearance: Sharpe's Mission (series)
- Created by: Bernard Cornwell
- Portrayed by: Will Whitlam

In-universe information
- Title: Chosen Man
- Occupation: Soldier
- Nationality: English

Rifleman Bradshaw first appears in Sharpe's Gold. He was a quiet rifleman, rarely speaking. He was often seen with Rifleman Tobias Moore. He appeared in Sharpe's Battle as well, and also took part in the Franco-Spanish Border towards where Brigadier General Loup. He also helped Lord Kiley and the Irish Company be trained before the attack. Bradshaw was also friends with Hagman, Moore and Harris, he was often seen with them. He survived Loup's village along with Harper, Hagman, Harris, Moore and Millerson, unfortunately Perkins was killed at the hands of Irish Company Guardsman O'Rourke. He appeared in Sharpe's Sword, and partook at El Mirador's place, but with a stay at the town Villafranca. He stayed at Father Curtis' church for the night, then later one night he partook in the battle at the French fortress, which resulted in the deaths of half of Col. Berkeley's men and Col. Berkeley himself. He survived but Sharpe was severely wounded. After Sharpe had recovered, he partook again attacking the fortress and he survived the battle. He has a cameo in Sharpe's Regiment, but is seen only at the beginning and end. Bradshaw also appeared in Sharpe's Siege, and was there before they would head to France, took part in the battle of Bordeaux and survived it. Rifleman Bradshaw also appeared in Sharpe's Mission and participated in the Battle of France.

=== Cameron ===
Cameron
- First appearance: Sharpe's Rifles (novels)
- Last appearance: Sharpe's Rifles (novels)
- Created by: Bernard Cornwell

In-universe information
- Nickname: Cam
- Title: Rifleman
- Occupation: Soldier
- Nationality: English

Rifleman Cameron first appears in Sharpe's Rifles, in which he accompanies Sharpe in the retreat to Corunna, where he is wounded. He fought in the First Battle of Oporto and also partook in the Second Battle of Oporto which he survived. Cameron fought with Sharpe in the Battle at Talavera although he is not mentioned in Sharpe's Eagle. He also participated in the destruction of Almeida, but is not mentioned in Sharpe's Gold and also partook in Sharpe's Escape during the battle of Bussaco. He partook in the Battle of Fuentes de Oñoro, and went to fight with Sharpe in the siege of Ciudad Rodrigo and the siege of Badajoz. He goes on to fight in the Battle of Salamanca in Sharpe's Sword and alongside Sharpe in Sharpe's Enemy, but is not mentioned. In battle, Cameron partners fellow rifleman and friend Rifleman Harvey.

Cameron does not appear in the TV series adaptions.

=== Carter ===
Carter
- First appearance: Sharpe's Havoc (Novels)
- Last appearance: Sharpe's Escape (Novels)
- Created by: Bernard Cornwell

In-universe information
- Title: Rifleman
- Occupation: Soldier
- Nationality: English

Rifleman Carter first appeared in Sharpe's Havoc. He fought in the First Battle of Oporto and also partook in the Second Battle of Oporto which he survived. Carter fought with Sharpe in the Battle at Talavera although he was not mentioned in Sharpe's Eagle. He also participated in the destruction of Almeida and also partook in Sharpe's Escape during the battle of Bussaco. He partook in the Battle of Fuentes de Oñoro and fight with Sharpe in the Siege of Ciudad Rodrigo and the Siege of Badajoz. Carter was described as being a Catholic, a quiet individual who was lucky. His best friend is Rifleman Matthew Dodd who he partnered in battles.

Rifleman Carter never appeared in the TV series adaptions.

=== Francis Cooper ===
Francis Cooper
- First appearance: Sharpe's Prey (Novels) Sharpe's Rifles (Series)
- Last appearance: Sharpe's Christmas (Novels) Sharpe's Gold (Series)
- Created by: Bernard Cornwell
- Portrayed by: Michael Mears

In-universe information
- Nickname: Coops
- Title: Chosen Man
- Occupation: Soldier
- Nationality: English

Rifleman Francis Cooper was a Chosen Man who served in the 95th Rifles. He was born in the London slums, where he learned his trade in thieving and pick pocketing. While he has a reputation for being unintelligent and impulsive at times, he is one of the best shots, rarely missing an opportunity, whether its to leave the column to shoot a rabbit for supper, or to eye up any pretty lady.

In the novels Cooper first appeared in Sharpe's Prey and was one of the original men of Major Dunnett participating in the Battle of Copenhagen alongside Harper, and Harris. He made an appearance in Sharpe's Rifles and on the retreat to Corunna.

He featured in Sharpe's Havoc during the victory at Oporto and the Second Battle of Porto. He also appeared in Sharpe's Battle during the Battle of Fuentes de Oñoro and went to appear in the last novel Sharpe's Skirmish during the Defense of Tormes. He is referred to as one of Sharpe's best marksmen along with Hagman, Thompson and Harris.

In the TV Series adaption he is played by Michael Mears. He first appears in Sharpe's Rifles and goes to fight with Sharpe until Sharpe's Gold. Cooper was supposed to have appeared as a full-time Chosen Man and was originally going to be a long living member of Sharpe's Chosen Men, presumably to feature in either Sharpe's Mission or Sharpe's Waterloo. He was to have been and would have been the last of Sharpe's Chosen Men along with Harper to survive Waterloo, but plans changed when Michael Mears was called onto other films. His role-play was replaced with Richard Rutherford-Moore playing as Rifleman Moore, a new Chosen Man, who had no dialogue.

=== Christopher Cresacre ===
Christopher Cresacre
- First appearance: Sharpe's Havoc (Novels)
- Last appearance: Sharpe's Company (Novels)
- Created by: Bernard Cornwell

In-universe information
- Title: Rifleman
- Occupation: Soldier
- Nationality: English

Rifleman Christopher Cresacre first appeared in Sharpe's Havoc however he would have accompanied Sharpe in the retreat to Corunna but was he was never mentioned in Sharpe's Rifles. Cresacre fought in the First Battle of Oporto and also partook in the Second Battle of Oporto which he survived. Cresacre fought with Sharpe in the Battle at Talavera where Sharpe captured a French Eagle. He also participated in the destruction of Almeida in Sharpe's Gold and also partook in Sharpe's Escape during the battle of Bussaco. Cresacre featured in Sharpe's Battle. He partook in the Battle of Fuentes de Oñoro and went to fight with Sharpe in the Siege of Ciudad Rodrigo and the Siege of Badajoz. Cresacre was unfortunately killed in the siege of Badajoz in Sharpe's Company. Sharpe was angered by the death of Cresacre indicating he valued the rifleman. Cresacre was described as a moaner and a grumbler. He was also one of the rifleman who was considered to be troublesome.

Rifleman Cresacre never appeared in the TV Series adaptations.

=== Matthew Dodd ===
Matthew Dodd
- First appearance: Sharpe's Rifles (Novels)
- Last appearance: Sharpe's Escape (Novels)
- Created by: Bernard Cornwell

In-universe information
- Title: Corporal (highest rank achieved)
- Occupation: Soldier
- Nationality: English

Rifleman Matthew Dodd is a fictional character who appears in several of the Sharpe books by Bernard Cornwell.

Rifleman Dodd is a quiet individual of Sharpe's chosen men, based on C. S. Forester's novel Death to the French fictional character, Dodd fights along with Sharpe from Sharpe's Rifles until being promoted to corporal in Sharpe's Escape. where he goes missing in action and separated from the group; however Bernard Cornwell never mentioned Dodd returning with the company at the end of the book. However, in C. S. Forester's novel Death to the French he does find his way back to the regiment.

Matthew Dodd isn't related to William Dodd nor are they family. He never appeared in the TV Series adaptations.

=== Sean Donnelly ===
Sean Donnelly
- First appearance: Sharpe's Havoc (Novels)
- Last appearance: Sharpe's Havoc (Novels)
- Created by: Bernard Cornwell

In-universe information
- Title: Rifleman
- Occupation: Soldier
- Nationality: Irish

Rifleman Sean Donnelly is one of the original riflemen who was involved in the retreat to Corunna in Sharpe's Rifles though he was not mentioned in the novel. He was mentioned in Sharpe's Havoc but was unfortunately killed. He was born in Derry in Ireland. He is described in the novels as being a little evil person who could shoot straight when not drunk. Donnelly was one of the trouble makers in the company along with Sims, Gataker, Cresacre, Williamson and Tarrent though Sharpe regarded him as a good man.

Rifleman Donnelly never appeared in the TV Series adaptations.

=== Warren Dunnett ===
Warren Dunnet
- First appearance: Sharpe's Prey (Novels) Sharpe's Rifles (Series)
- Last appearance: Sharpe's Waterloo (Novels) Sharpe's Rifles (Series)
- Created by: Bernard Cornwell
- Portrayed by: Julian Fellowes

In-universe information
- Title: Major
- Occupation: British Officer
- Nationality: English

Major Warren Dunnett of the 95th Rifles appears in Sharpe's Prey and then in Sharpe's Rifles as Richard Sharpe's commanding officer. On the retreat to Corunna in Sharpe's Rifles, Dunnett is captured by the French in the skirmish that separates Sharpe and the fifty surviving riflemen from Sir John Moore's army. Dunnett has the misfortune to then spend the remainder of the War languishing in captivity, while the lieutenant he despised rises through the ranks. He was given the freedom of the town of Verdun, and his captivity was not harsh, but he had no money for bribes or luxuries, and he stated he'd much rather die than ever see that town again.

When he and Sharpe meet again at Waterloo, he is thin and worn, and is incredulous Harper had survived, expecting the man should have died long since, and calling him a rogue. He then apologizes to Sharpe, saying he had been wrong in his opinion of the man from the ranks, and that it was good to see him again; so few of the old battalion still lived, so many had died at New Orleans.

In the television series Dunnett was played by Julian Fellowes, who would go on to also play the Prince of Wales in Sharpe's Regiment.

The character of Dunnett did not reappear in the film adaptation of Sharpe's Waterloo as he was shown as killed in the action depicted in Sharpe's Rifles.

=== Finn ===
Finn
- First appearance: Sharpe's Battle (Novels)
- Last appearance: Sharpe's Battle (Novels)
- Created by: Bernard Cornwell

In-universe information
- Title: Rifleman
- Occupation: Soldier
- Nationality: Irish

Rifleman Finn first appeared in Sharpe's Battle; however he would have accompanied Sharpe in the retreat to Corunna in Sharpe's Rifles. He fought in the First Battle of Oporto and also partook in the Second Battle of Oporto which he survived. Finn fought with Sharpe in the Battle at Talavera although he was not mentioned in Sharpe's Eagle. He also participated in the destruction of Almeida but wasn't mentioned in Sharpe's Gold and also partook in Sharpe's Escape during the battle of Bussaco. He partook in the Battle of Fuentes de Oñoro and went to fight with Sharpe in the Siege of Ciudad Rodrigo and the Siege of Badajoz. He went on to fight in the Battle of Salamanca in Sharpe's Sword but he wasn't mentioned. Finn went onto fight alongside Sharpe in Sharpe's Enemy but he wasn't mentioned at all. Finn wasn't mentioned in Sharpe's Honour, Regiment, Christmas, Siege, Revenge, or Waterloo. Either Finn did not fight at Waterloo or he was killed prior to the battle. Finn was part of the Irish contingent of Sharpe's Riflemen along with Harper, Slattery and Donnelly.

Rifleman Finn never appeared in the TV Series adaptations.

=== Gataker ===
Gataker
- First appearance: Sharpe's Rifles (Novels)
- Last appearance: Sharpe's Eagle(Novels)
- Created by: Bernard Cornwell

In-universe information
- Title: Rifleman
- Occupation: Soldier
- Nationality: English

Rifleman Gataker is one of the original riflemen who was involved in the retreat to Corunna in Sharpe's Rifles. He was not considered for a promotion to sergeant as Sharpe saw him as being too fly [vernacular?] for his own good. He may not have been one of the best shots of the riflemen, as in Sharpe's Eagle he was asked to keep reloading for Hagman. Rifleman Gataker was mentioned in Sharpe's Havoc where he fought in the First Battle of Oporto and also partook in the Second Battle of Oporto which he survived. He also featured in Sharpe's Eagle where Gataker fought with Sharpe in the Battle at Talavera. Gataker was unfortunately killed at the beginning of the battle when a shell landed next to him and exploded.

Rifleman Gataker never appeared in the TV Series adaptions.

=== Green ===
Green
- First appearance: Sharpe's Battle (Novels)
- Last appearance: Sharpe's Company (Novels)
- Created by: Bernard Cornwell

In-universe information
- Title: Rifleman
- Occupation: Soldier
- Nationality: English

Rifleman Green first appeared in Sharpe's Battle however he would have accompanied Sharpe in the retreat to Corunna but was he was never mentioned in Sharpe's Rifles. He fought in the First Battle of Oporto and also partook in the Second Battle of Oporto which he survived. Green fought with Sharpe in the Battle at Talavera although he was not mentioned in Sharpe's Eagle. He also participated in the destruction of Almeida but wasn't mentioned in Sharpe's Gold and also partook in Sharpe's Escape during the battle of Bussaco. He partook in the Battle of Fuentes de Oñoro in and went to fight with Sharpe in the Siege of Ciudad Rodrigo and the Siege of Badajoz. He went on to fight in the Battle of Salamanca in Sharpe's Sword but he wasn't mentioned. Green went on to fight alongside Sharpe in Sharpe's Enemy but he wasn't mentioned at all. Green wasn't mentioned in Sharpe's Honour, Regiment, Christmas, Siege, Revenge, or Waterloo. Either Green did not fight at Waterloo or he was killed prior to the battle.

Rifleman Green never appeared in the TV Series adaptions.

=== Daniel Hagman ===
Daniel Hagman
- First appearance: Sharpe's Rifles (Novels) Sharpe's Rifles (Series)
- Last appearance: Sharpe's Waterloo (Novels) Sharpe's Waterloo (Series)
- Created by: Bernard Cornwell
- Portrayed by: John Tams

In-universe information
- Nickname: Dan
- Title(s): Chosen Man & Sergeant (highest rank achieved)
- Occupation: Poacher, Rifleman

Rifleman Daniel Hagman is the oldest man in Sharpe's company and, over the entire course of the novels, its best marksman. Hagman is one of the Chosen Men and appears in nearly all the original Sharpe novels and television series. Sharpe initially thought of Hagman as being too lazy to be considered for sergeant. Although he doesn't know exactly when he was born, he is described as being between forty and fifty years old, and missing most of his teeth. He has "a face like a grave-digger, hair down to his shoulder blades" (Sharpe's Skirmish). He had been a poacher in Cheshire, as had been his father. When caught, he was given the choice of prison or the army. He chose the army, leaving his wife, a "God-damned sawney mouthed bitch of a sodding witch" behind (Sharpe's Rifles). Sharpe wondered how he'd ever been caught since he had an uncanny ability to find his way in the dark and assumed he must have been drunk (Sharpe's Gold). Hagman was one of the very few who had not got insensibly drunk with the rest of the company in Sharpe's Rifles.

He was seriously wounded at a skirmish outside Barca d'Avintas in Portugal, taking a ball to the chest. Sharpe refused to leave him behind, and as luck would have it, they billeted in one of the English merchant's houses for almost a month, giving Hagman the chance to heal. While delirious he muttered the name "Amy," and was later surprised he had, since he had not thought of her in years. He explained she had been the rector's daughter - who did things no rector's daughter ought to do. He then recommended a poultice of spider webs, moss, and vinegar backed on brown paper and tied tight to the wound. Apparently it worked because he marched out with his company (Sharpe's Havoc).

While the company was under siege at San Isidro in Sharpe's Battle, he reveals that as a boy he spent a year down a coal mine in Derbyshire. He hated the mine, and was frightened from the moment he entered the shaft. He also said working girls used to come down the mine and work their trade among the men. A girl called Dwarf Babs who charged a penny, was his first woman, "And she didn't even charge me." He figured that if his father had not died about then, which had his mother moving to Handbridge to live with her sister, he'd have been there still - or dead, since life expectancy in the mines was about thirty.

In Sharpe's Enemy he offers to play valet for Sharpe, but is refused. The amused Hagman told Sharpe he was a bloody awful Major, "You have to learn to have things done for you, sir, like the nobs." That if he ate with quality, he couldn't look like a tinker. Although for himself, he could not see the point of a fork when the good Lord gave you fingers.

In Sharpe's Christmas, it was Hagman who was called upon to deliver the baby of a French camp follower, "Isn't the first baby I've done, sir.... I'll see her right." He is also apparently the alternate barber to Sally Clayton, cutting Sharpe's hair when needed (Sharpe's Havoc).

He can neither read nor write, but he is the best marksman among the Rifles. He was a careful and deliberate shot, precise, preferring using the finest loose powder to charge his weapon rather than the prepared cartridges. He often follows each shot with a softly spoken "got him."

During the battle of Waterloo, after Sharpe takes command of the Prince of Wales' Own, Hagman takes a bullet through the chest and is fatally wounded. Sharpe kneels beside him, holding his hand, as the older man bleeds out. Sharpe offers to get him to the surgeons, but Hagman's last words were, "Bugger them surgeons, Mr Sharpe." Hagman then dies in Sharpe's arms (Sharpe's Waterloo). After the Battle he is buried by Harper and Sharpe along with Sharpe's rifle (Sharpe's Assassin).

In the TV adaptations he was played by John Tams, a noted English folk musician and composer, who arranged and sang much of the music used in the series. A number of differences exist between the character in the book and the TV character, notably that in the TV adaptation he is killed at La Haye Saint rather than at Sharpe's side.

In Sharpe's Rifles it was with Hagman that Sharpe made his first inroads toward connecting with his new command. He stopped to speak with the former poacher and helped him through a boggy ground.

He served a chief midwife for Ramona when she gave birth to Harper's son in Sharpe's Honour. He was calm and cool throughout, but admitted he'd never helped a human give birth before.

In Sharpe's Siege, Matthew Robinson, a young rifleman from the 60th Rifles reckoned he was the best shot in the company, and like Hagman liked to grind his powder fine, and load with loose powder rather than the prepared cartridges when there was time. Upon observing Robinson's grind, Hagman commented drily, "If ye grind it too fine, it'll blow yer bloody head off, then nobody'll know who's best shot; thee or me." When Robinson later had the opportunity to act as sniper, his target survived, so Hagman backed him up and delivered a fatal shot. The two marksmen shook hands and agreed that Robinson was second best shot.

At Waterloo, he and Harris rejoin Sharpe and take positions as sergeants on the Prince of Orange's roster. At the defense of La Haye Sainte, they ran out of ammunition, and in his effort to abandon the location, Orange knocked Hagman to the ground. A French infantryman then shot him in the head, and he died instantly. Sharpe came near tears when he heard, and attempted to assassinate Orange to prevent any more unnecessary deaths among the men.

=== Patrick Harper ===
Patrick Harper
- First appearance: Sharpe's Prey (Novels) Sharpe's Rifles (Series)
- Last appearance: Sharpe's Devil (Novels) Sharpe's Peril (Series)
- Created by: Bernard Cornwell
- Portrayed by: Daragh O'Malley

In-universe information
- Nickname: Harps/Pat
- Title(s): Chosen Man & Sergeant Major (highest rank achieved)
- Occupation: Soldier
- Spouses: Isabella Harper (books); Ramona Harper (TV series)
- Religion: Catholic
- Nationality: Irish

Sergeant Major Patrick 'Pat' Harper is a large, fierce-seeming man from Donegal, Ireland, recruited in the early years of the 19th century into the British Army and eventually the 95th Rifle Regiment.

Harper is initially an antagonist, as he leads a mutiny against Sharpe's command and conspires to murder him in Sharpe's Rifles. Over the course of the series Harper becomes one of Sharpe's closest friends and his most reliable companion (to the point where the duo privately address each other by their first names), sharing most of his exploits and rising in rank beside him to sergeant and regimental sergeant major.

Along with Sharpe he is one of the principal protagonists of the series and appears in the majority of the books.

Patrick Harper was born in Tangaveane, an agricultural townland in County Donegal in 1784, one of many children born into a farming family in the Catholic peasantry that predominated in rural Ireland at the time. Hunger and rural poverty drove him to join the British army, despite his antipathy to the British in Ireland.

This ambivalence at his role led to frequent rebellion against authority and a reputation as troublemaker, one of the wildest men in the army. Consequently, he was transferred from regiment to regiment, until he settled in the newly formed 95th Rifles.

Rifleman Harper got his first taste of battle when, in 1806, he was part of the disastrous attempt to capture Buenos Aires and the following year saw action at the Battle of Copenhagen (Sharpe's Prey).

In 1808 the Rifles were posted to Portugal and fought in the opening campaigns of the Peninsular War, at the Battles of Roliça and Vimeiro. During the retreat to Corunna Harper was among a small group of Riflemen trapped behind enemy lines and led an unsuccessful mutiny against the only surviving officer – Richard Sharpe (Sharpe's Rifles).

Harper's friendship with Sharpe and his promotion to sergeant led him to transfer with Sharpe to the South Essex Regiment (Sharpe's Eagle) and serve throughout the Peninsular War.

Among the exploits he shares with Sharpe, Harper is credited with the capture of a French Imperial Eagle at the Battle of Talavera in 1809 and storming of one of the breaches at Badajoz in 1812 (Sharpe's Company).

He is discharged from the army in 1814, but is present at the Battle of Waterloo as a civilian (Sharpe's Waterloo).

He enjoys a successful second career in Dublin as a horse dealer (many of which are stolen) and owner of a public house.

Despite his ferocity in battle, where he seems to embody the berserker energy of legendary Irish heroes such as Cú Chulainn, Harper is a kind and gentle man, with a passion for birdwatching. His weapon of choice is a Nock gun, given to him by Sharpe as a "Christmas present" (Sharpe's Gold).

Harper is flogged during the siege of Badajoz as a result of the machinations of Sharpe's enemy Obadiah Hakeswill.

Harper protects Isabella, a young Spanish girl, through the horrific hours of rape and looting that follow the capture of Badajoz. They subsequently marry and settle in Dublin, where they raise many children.

(In the television adaptations Harper's wife is called Ramona and their meeting during the sack of Badajoz is not depicted.)

Harper speaks fluent Irish, his native tongue, in addition to English.

Five years after Waterloo in Sharpe's Devil he had grown very fat. Ironically, as Harper was not wounded throughout the Peninsular War, he is wounded for the first time in Chile while there with Sharpe attempting to locate Blas Vivar, the Spaniard who rescued them in Sharpe's Rifles.

Harper is played by Daragh O'Malley in the Sharpe TV series.

In the Sharpe novels, Harper's middle name is given as Augustine. But in the Sharpe TV series, it was changed to Michael.

=== Harris ===
Harris
- First appearance: Sharpe's Prey (Novels) Sharpe's Rifles (Series)
- Last appearance: Sharpe's Christmas (Novels) Sharpe's Waterloo (Series)
- Created by: Bernard Cornwell
- Portrayed by: Jason Salkey

In-universe information
- Title(s): Chosen Man & Sergeant ( highest rank achieved )
- Occupation: Rifleman
- Nationality: English

Rifleman Harris is a fictional character from Bernard Cornwell's Sharpe series of novels, an alcoholic scholar who enlisted because of debt.

In the TV series, he is a rifleman, one of Sharpe's Chosen Men or lance corporals and is played by Jason Salkey. In Sharpe's Rifles, he claims to be from Wheatley, Oxfordshire. This is contradicted in the novel Sharpe's Havoc, written after the television adaptations, where Harris tells Sharpe he is from Lichfield, "where Samuel Johnson came from".

He enjoys reading books, especially philosophy and is the intellectual member of the company. In the books the educated Rifleman was Isaiah Tongue, killed in Sharpe's Gold.

He was eventually promoted to sergeant but was killed alongside his friend Sergeant Daniel Hagman at the Battle of Waterloo in 1815. In the books, Harris is absent from the battle.

He first appeared in Sharpe's Prey and, including Harper, was one of the only two men remaining from Major Dunnett's original company, from the Battle of Copenhagen. He is referred to as one of Sharpe's best marksmen, along with Hagman and Thompson. Harris last appears in Sharpe's Skirmish, but he may be alive as of Sharpe's Enemy, as he is likely to be one of the last nine from the retreat to Corunna left at the time. He possibly fought with Sharpe at the Battle of Vitoria and presumably the Battle of Nivelle. He most likely fought with Sharpe at the final Battle of Toulouse, and may still be alive as of Sharpe's Revenge, though Harris is absent in Sharpe's Waterloo. He does not appear at Waterloo and is absent from the battle.

His first name is never revealed in the series and in fact a joke is made of this in his final scene, with Hagman asking him what it is.

The character was named in tribute to Benjamin Randell Harris, of the 95th Rifles, whose memoir, The Recollections of Rifleman Harris, about his experiences during the Peninsular Campaign, was a major source for Cornwell's original research for the Sharpe novels (an audio version of the book was recorded by Salkey). Mimicking his real life inspiration Salkey published his own Sharpe memoir From Crimea With Love charting the filming of the TV series shot on location in Ukraine, Portugal, Türkiye and England. An audio version of the memoir is also voiced by Salkey.

=== Harvey ===
Harvey
- First appearance: Sharpe's Eagle (Novels)
- Last appearance: Sharpe's Escape (Novels)
- Created by: Bernard Cornwell

In-universe information
- Title: Rifleman
- Occupation: Soldier
- Nationality: English

Rifleman Harvey first appeared in Sharpe's Eagle but he would have accompanied Sharpe in the retreat to Corunna in Sharpe's Rifles. He fought in the First Battle of Oporto and also partook in the Second Battle of Oporto which he survived. Harvey fought with Sharpe in the Battle at Talavera in Sharpe's Eagle where he was asked to keep reloading for Hagman, maybe indicating that he was one of the weaker shots of the riflemen. He also participated in the destruction of Almeida but wasn't mentioned in Sharpe's Gold and also partook in Sharpe's Escape during the battle of Bussaco. He partook in the Battle of Fuentes de Oñoro in and went to fight with Sharpe in the Siege of Ciudad Rodrigo and the Siege of Badajoz. He went on to fight in the Battle of Salamanca in Sharpe's Sword but he wasn't mentioned. Harvey went onto fight alongside Sharpe in Sharpe's Enemy but he wasn't mentioned at all. Harvey wasn't mentioned in Sharpe's Honour, Regiment, Christmas, Siege, Revenge, or Waterloo. Either Harvey did not fight at Waterloo or he was killed prior to the battle. Harvey was best friends with Rifleman Cameron, with whom he partnered in battle.

Rifleman Harvey never appeared in the TV Series adaptations.

=== Nicholas Hine ===
Nicholas Hine
- First appearance: Sharpe's Havoc (novels)
- Last appearance: Sharpe's Battle (novels)
- Created by: Bernard Cornwell

In-universe information
- Nickname: Nick
- Title: Rifleman
- Occupation: Soldier
- Nationality: English

Rifleman Nicholas Hine is one of the original 50 riflemen cut off from Sir John Moore's army during the retreat to Corunna though he was not mentioned in Sharpe's Rifles. Rifleman Hine was first mentioned in Sharpe's Havoc where he fought in the First Battle of Oporto and also partook in the Second Battle of Oporto which he survived. In Sharpe's Eagle it is revealed that just over 30 rifleman survived the retreat to Corunna and Hine would have been one of them. He would have fought with Sharpe in the Battle at Talavera although he was not mentioned in Sharpe's Eagle. He also participated in the destruction of Almeida but also was not mentioned in Sharpe's Gold, where it states that there are 20 surviving riflemen. Hine also partook in the battle of Bussaco in Sharpe's Escape where it is mentioned that Sharpe only has 18 riflemen left. Hine was mentioned in Sharpe's Battle where he was involved in the Battle of Fuentes de Oñoro. In Sharpe's Company Sharpe has 11 surviving riflemen and in Sharpe's Enemy he has ten which included Harper. Hine wasn't mentioned in Sharpe's Honour, Regiment, Christmas, Siege, Revenge, or Waterloo. Either Hine did not fight at Waterloo or he was killed prior to the battle. He is described as being born in Staffordshire, over six feet tall, and popular with the other men. Despite being a very competent and reliable rifleman, Hine is also known to be over-confident and on occasions arrogant.

Rifleman Nicholas Hine never appeared in the TV series adaptations.

=== Hobbes ===
Hobbes
- First appearance: Sharpe's Revenge (Series)
- Last appearance: Sharpe's Revenge (Series)
- Created by: Bernard Cornwell

In-universe information
- Title: Rifleman
- Occupation: Soldier
- Nationality: English

Rifleman Hobbes is one of the original riflemen who was involved in the retreat to Corunna though he was not mentioned in Sharpe's Rifles. Hobbes would have fought in the First Battle of Oporto and also partook in the Second Battle of Oporto which he survived. He would have been with Sharpe in the Battle at Talavera although he was not mentioned in Sharpe's Eagle. He also participated in the destruction of Almeida but also was not mentioned in Sharpe's Gold and also partook in the battle of Bussaco in Sharpe's Escape. Hobbes wasn't mentioned in Sharpe's Honour, Regiment, Christmas or Siege. He however featured in Sharpe's Revenge. He was killed in the Battle of Toulouse while creating an opportunity for the South Essex to attack the French.

=== Jedediah Horrell ===
Jebediah Horrell
- First appearance: Sharpe's Eagle (Novels)
- Last appearance: Sharpe's Battle (Novels)
- Created by: Bernard Cornwell

In-universe information
- Nickname: Jed
- Title: Rifleman
- Occupation: Soldier
- Nationality: English

Rifleman Jedediah Horrell first appeared in Sharpe's Eagle however he would have accompanied Sharpe in the retreat to Corunna but he was never mentioned in Sharpe's Rifles. He fought in the First Battle of Oporto and also partook in the Second Battle of Oporto which he survived. Horrell fought with Sharpe in the Battle at Talavera in Sharpe's Eagle. He also participated in the destruction of Almeida but wasn't mentioned in Sharpe's Gold and also partook in Sharpe's Escape during the battle of Bussaco. Horrell featured in Sharpe's Battle. He partook in the Battle of Fuentes de Oñoro in and went to fight with Sharpe in the Siege of Ciudad Rodrigo and the Siege of Badajoz. He went on to fight in the Battle of Salamanca in Sharpe's Sword but he wasn't mentioned. Horrell went onto fight alongside Sharpe in Sharpe's Enemy but he wasn't mentioned at all. Horrell wasn't mentioned in Sharpe's Honour, Regiment, Christmas, Siege, Revenge, or Waterloo. Either Horrell did not fight at Waterloo or he was killed prior to the battle. He is described as a good man, a sturdy labourer from the Midlands.

Rifleman Horrell never appeared in the TV series adaptations.

=== Parry Jenkins ===
Parry Jenkins
- First appearance: Sharpe's Rifles (Novels)
- Last appearance: Sharpe's Sword (Novels)
- Created by: Bernard Cornwell

In-universe information
- Title: Chosen Man
- Occupation: Soldier
- Nationality: Welsh

Rifleman Parry Jenkins was a Welsh rifleman and chosen-man that served in the 95th Rifles. He was five feet and four inches tall and he was one of the best fishers amongst the men. He was considered in Sharpe's Rifles as a candidate for Sergeant but Sharpe thought he lacked the necessary ruthlessness. He got on well with Sharpe and the rest of the men.

Jenkins first appeared in Sharpe's Rifles, he was one of the original men from the retreat to Corunna. After the death of the senior officers leaves Sharpe in charge, Jenkins was one of those willing to listen to Sharpe. Jenkins partook in the battle of St. Jones, Santiago de Compostela, and managed to survive the battle and become one of the new Chosen Men with Sharpe.

In Sharpe's Gold Jenkins was one of only twenty rifleman out of the thirty-one survivors from Corunna remaining at the time. He participated in the Siege of Almeida in search of Claud Hardy, however they were too late and he was already dead. During the mission, one of Jenkins's closest friends, Rifleman Isaiah Tongue, was killed by a French sharpshooter. Jenkins blamed himself for Tongue's death and had to be reassured by Sharpe. Jenkins survived the Siege of Almeida.

In Sharpe's Company Jenkins participated in the Siege of Ciudad Rodrigo and the Siege of Badajoz. Jenkins survived the assault.

His final appearance was in Sharpe's Sword where he had a minor role but participated in the Battle of Salamanca and survived. Jenkins presumably went on to fight with Sharpe during the Defence of Tormes, where it is mentioned that only nine from the retreat to Corunna were left at this time. He may have fought in the Battle of Vitoria in Sharpe's Honour and followed Sharpe during the Invasion of France, perhaps even up to the final battle of Toulouse as of Sharpe's Revenge. Jenkins wasn't mentioned in Sharpe's Skirmish, Enemy, Honour, Regiment, Christmas, Siege, Revenge, or Waterloo. Either Jenkins did not fight at Waterloo or he was killed prior to the battle.

Parry Jenkins never appeared in the TV Series adaptions.

=== Latimer ===
Latimer
- First appearance: Sharpe's Battle (Novels)
- Last appearance: Sharpe's Company (Novels)
- Created by: Bernard Cornwell

In-universe information
- Title: Sergeant
- Occupation: Soldier
- Nationality: English

Sergeant Latimer first appeared in Sharpe's Battle. Although he would have accompanied Sharpe in the retreat to Corunna, was he was never mentioned in Sharpe's Rifles. He fought in the First and Second Battles of Oporto, which he survived. Latimer fought with Sharpe in the Battle at Talavera, although he was not mentioned in Sharpe's Eagle. He also participated in the destruction of Almeida but wasn't mentioned in Sharpe's Gold; he also partook in Sharpe's Escape during the battle of Bussaco. He fought in the Battle of Fuentes de Oñoro and went on to fight with Sharpe in the Siege of Ciudad Rodrigo and the Siege of Badajoz (Sharpe's Company). He went on to fight in the Battle of Salamanca in Sharpe's Sword but he wasn't mentioned. Latimer went on to fight alongside Sharpe in Sharpe's Enemy but he wasn't mentioned at all. [please explain how the character could be present in literature in which he was not mentioned] Latimer wasn't mentioned in Sharpe's Honour, Regiment, Christmas, Siege, Revenge, or Waterloo. Either Latimer did not fight at Waterloo or he was killed prior to the battle. It is unknown when Latimer became a sergeant, as in Sharpe's Rifles Sharpe only saw Harper as a suitable replacement for Williams. It may be fair to assume that when the Rifles were drafted into the South Essex, Sharpe needed more sergeants, and as such Rifleman Latimer was suitable for the role.

Sergeant Latimer never appeared in the TV series adaptations.

=== McDonald ===
McDonald
- First appearance: Sharpe's Battle (Novels)
- Last appearance: Sharpe's Company (Novels)
- Created by: Bernard Cornwell

In-universe information
- Title: Rifleman
- Occupation: Soldier
- Nationality: Scottish

Rifleman McDonald first appeared in Sharpe's Battle. He would have accompanied Sharpe in the retreat to Corunna but was he was never mentioned in Sharpe's Rifles. He fought in and survived the First and Second Battles of Oporto. McDonald fought with Sharpe in the Battle at Talavera although he was not mentioned in Sharpe's Eagle. He also participated in the destruction of Almeida but wasn't mentioned in Sharpe's Gold and also partook in Sharpe's Escape during the battle of Bussaco. He partook in the Battle of Fuentes de Oñoro in and went to fight with Sharpe in the Siege of Ciudad Rodrigo and the Siege of Badajoz. McDonald wasn't mentioned in Sharpe's Enemy, Sword, Honour, Regiment, Christmas, Siege, Revenge, or Waterloo. Either McDonald did not fight at Waterloo or he was killed prior to the battle.

Rifleman McDonald is not to be confused with Ensign McDonald in Sharpe's Sword. He never appeared in the TV series adaptations.

=== McNeill ===
Nicholas Hine
- First appearance: Sharpe's Havoc (Novels)
- Last appearance: Sharpe's Havoc (Novels)
- Created by: Bernard Cornwell

In-universe information
- Title: Rifleman
- Occupation: Soldier
- Nationality: Scottish

Rifleman McNeill first appeared in Sharpe's Havoc but would have accompanied Sharpe in the retreat to Corunna in Sharpe's Rifles. He fought in the First Battle of Oporto and also partook in the Second Battle of Oporto which he survived. McNeill fought with Sharpe in the Battle at Talavera although he was not mentioned in Sharpe's Eagle. He also participated in the destruction of Almeida but wasn't mentioned in Sharpe's Gold and also partook in Sharpe's Escape during the battle of Bussaco. He partook in the Battle of Fuentes de Oñoro in and went to fight with Sharpe in the Siege of Ciudad Rodrigo and the Siege of Badajoz. He went on to fight in the Battle of Salamanca in Sharpe's Sword but he wasn't mentioned. McNeill went onto fight alongside Sharpe in Sharpe's Enemy but he wasn't mentioned at all. McNeill wasn't mentioned in Sharpe's Honour, Regiment, Christmas, Siege, Revenge, or Waterloo. Either McNeill did not fight at Waterloo or he was killed prior to the battle. He is described in the novels as being a Catholic.

Rifleman McNeill never appeared in the TV series adaptations.

=== Millerson ===
Millerson
- First appearance: Sharpe's Gold (Series)
- Last appearance: Sharpe's Mission (Series)
- Created by: Bernard Cornwell

In-universe information
- Title: Rifleman
- Occupation: Soldier
- Nationality: English

Rifleman Millerson first appeared in Sharpe's Gold when Rifleman Skillicorn was accused by provosts of stealing a chicken. He appeared in Sharpe's Battle as well, and also took part in the Franco-Spanish Border towards where Brigadier General Loup operated. He also helped Lord Kiley and the Irish Company train before the attack. He survived Loup's village along with Harper, Hagman, Harris, Moore and Bradshaw. He appeared in Sharpe's Sword, and partook at El Mirador's place, but with a stay at the town Villafranca. He stayed at Father Curtis's church for the night, but then later one night he partook in the battle at the French fortress, which resulted in the deaths of half of Col Berkeley's men and Berkeley as well. He survived but Sharpe was severely wounded. After Sharpe had recovered, Millerson partook again in attacking the fortress, and he survived the battle. He had a cameo appearance in Sharpe's Regiment but didn't get seen through the whole story, only in the beginning and the end. Millerson also appeared in Sharpe's Siege, and was there before they would head to France, where he fought in the battle of Bordeaux and survived. Rifleman Millerson also appeared in Sharpe's Mission and partook in the Battle of France.

=== Tobias Moore ===
Tobias Moore
- First appearance: Sharpe's Company (Series)
- Last appearance: Sharpe's Mission (Series)
- Created by: Bernard Cornwell
- Portrayed by: Richard Rutherford-Moore

In-universe information
- Title: Chosen Man
- Occupation: Soldier
- Nationality: English

Rifleman Tobias Moore first appeared in Sharpe's Company with the forlorn hope at the siege of Badajoz which he survived and was rewarded a laurel wreath. He then appeared in Sharpe's Honour and partook in the Battle of Vitoria, he was hiding in the bushes and gave Sergeant Harper his 7 barrel gun to him who also offered him a rifle, he welcomed him aboard, possibly meaning he was one of the new Chosen Men, he survived and managed to take the cannons and the Battle of Vitoria was won, he was seen later with an unnamed girlfriend at camp dancing with her for the victory of Vitoria as well. He appeared in Sharpe's Battle as well, and also took part in the Franco-Spanish Border towards where Brigadier General Loup. He also helped Lord Kiley and the Irish Company be trained before the attack, he was friends with Hagman, Bradshaw and Harris because he was often seen at times with them. He survived Loup's village along with Harper, Hagman, Harris, Bradshaw and Millerson, unfortunately Perkins was killed in the hands of Irish Company Guardsman O'Rourke. He appeared in Sharpe's Sword, and partook at El Mirador's place, but with a stay at the town Villafranca. He stayed at Father Curtis's church for the night, but then later one night he partook in the battle at the French fortress, which resulted in the deaths of half of Col Berkeley's men and Berkeley as well. He survived but Sharpe was severely wounded. After Sharpe had recovered, he partook again attacking the fortress and he survived the battle. He cameoed in Sharpe's Regiment but didn't get seen through the whole story, only in the start and end. Moore also appeared in Sharpe's Siege, and was there before they would head to France, partaken in the battle of Bordeaux and survived it. Rifleman Moore also appeared in Sharpe's Mission and partook in the Battle of France.

=== John Murray ===
John Murray
- First appearance: Sharpe's Prey (Novels) Sharpe's Rifles (Series)
- Last appearance: Sharpe's Rifles (Novels) Sharpe's Rifles (Series)
- Created by: Bernard Cornwell
- Portrayed by: Tim Bentinck

In-universe information
- Title: Captain
- Occupation: British Officer
- Nationality: English

Captain John Murray of the 95th Rifles first appears in Sharpe's Prey. He is Sharpe's immediate superior and was mortally wounded during the Corunna retreat. Before he dies, he gives Sharpe his heavy cavalry sword, hoping the men will accept Sharpe, thinking Murray favored him. Sharpe eventually manages to do this, and the two men form a bond becoming the most effective team in the battalion. When the sword Murray gave to Sharpe broke in Sharpe's Sword, it was Harper who found and modified a replacement blade.

In the television movie Sharpe's Rifles, he was played by actor Tim Betinck (who is also the actual 12th Earl of Portland, Viscount Woodstock and Baron Cirenceste).

=== Pendleton ===
Pendleton
- First appearance: Sharpe's Havoc (Novels)
- Last appearance: Sharpe's Eagle (Novels)
- Created by: Bernard Cornwell

In-universe information
- Title: Rifleman
- Occupation: Soldier
- Nationality: English

Rifleman Pendleton is one of the original riflemen who was involved in the retreat to Corunna in Sharpe's Rifles though he was not mentioned in the novel. Rifleman Pendleton was mentioned in Sharpe's Havoc where he fought in the First Battle of Oporto and also partook in the Second Battle of Oporto which he survived. He also featured in Sharpe's Eagle where Pendleton fought with Sharpe in the Battle at Talavera. Pendleton was unfortunately killed during the battle. Pendleton was the youngest in the company being only seventeen years of age. He was a thief, pick pocket and a purse snatcher from Bristol.

Rifleman Pendleton never appeared in the TV Series adaptions.

=== Ben Perkins ===
Ben Perkins
- First appearance: Sharpe's Havoc (Novels) Sharpe's Rifles (Series)
- Last appearance: Sharpe's Christmas (Novels) Sharpe's Battle (Series)
- Created by: Bernard Cornwell
- Portrayed by: Lyndon Davies

In-universe information
- Title: Chosen Man
- Occupation: Soldier
- Spouses: Miranda (lover and possible future wife) (Alive: novels) (television: deceased)
- Nationality: English

Rifleman Ben Perkins is a fictional character in the Richard Sharpe stories written by Bernard Cornwell. Rifleman Ben Perkins also appeared in episodes of the Sharpe television series, played by Lyndon Davies.

Rifleman Ben Perkins first appeared in Sharpe's Havoc however he would have accompanied Sharpe in the retreat to Corunna but was he was never mentioned in Sharpe's Rifles. Perkins was from London and was an unappealing street rat who swept horse manure out of the way for pedestrians in hope of a coin. He was the second youngest of the riflemen however neither Perkins nor Rifleman Pendleton knew the day or the year of their birth. Both were young enough to not yet need to shave. Perkins was only a young rookie alongside Pendleton at the time of Havoc. He fought in the First Battle of Oporto and also partook in the Second Battle of Oporto which he survived. Perkins fought with Sharpe in the Battle at Talavera although he was not mentioned in Sharpe's Eagle. He also participated in the destruction of Almeida but wasn't mentioned in Sharpe's Gold and also partook in Sharpe's Escape during the battle of Bussaco. He returned again in Sharpe's Fury, alongside, Sharpe, Harper, Hagman, Harris, and Slattery, however in the Battle at Barrosa it cost the life of Slattery. He partook in the Battle of Fuentes de Oñoro and his major role in Sharpe's Battle was he had a romantic relationship with Miranda after she was raped by the French soldiers in Grey uniform led by Brigadier-General Guy Loup. He was also accused when his green coat was missing when Juanita stole his jacket. perkins was touchy about the loss of his jacket and the loss of his armband denoting he was a chosen man, a compliment that was paid to the most reliable and best riflemen. He also survived the battle of Fuentes de Oñoro, and went to fight with Sharpe in the Siege of Ciudad Rodrigo and the Siege of Badajoz. Perkins was not mentioned in the novel Sharpe's Company however he went on to fight in the Battle of Salamanca in Sharpe's Sword but he wasn't mentioned. He reappears in Sharpe's Skirmish in the defence of the Tormes. He survived the defence of the Alba de Tormes, and he went onto fight alongside Sharpe in Sharpe's Enemy but he wasn't mentioned at all. Perkins wasn't mentioned in Sharpe's Honour, Regiment, Christmas, Siege, Revenge, or Waterloo. In Sharpe's Waterloo it is noted that Rifleman Hagman is Sharpe's only remaining riflemen left from the retreat to Corunna, suggesting that Perkins did not fight at Waterloo or that he was killed prior to the battle or whether he survived the Peninsular War possibly to marry Miranda is concurrently unknown.

Riflemen Ben Perkins appears in the TV adaptation played by Lyndon Davies. Like the Novels, Perkins is the youngest of the Sharpe's Riflemen. He appeared in all the Sharpe films until he was eventually killed off in Sharpe's Battle.

=== Sims ===
Sims
- First appearance: Sharpe's Rifles (Novels)
- Last appearance: Sharpe's Escape (Novels)
- Created by: Bernard Cornwell

In-universe information
- Title: Rifleman
- Occupation: Soldier
- Nationality: English

Rifleman Sims appeared in Sharpe's Rifles where he accompanied Sharpe in the retreat to Corunna. He fought in the First Battle of Oporto and also partook in the Second Battle of Oporto which he survived. Sims fought with Sharpe in the Battle at Talavera in Sharpe's Eagle where he was asked to keep reloading for Hagman indicating that he may have been one of the weakest shots of Sharpe's rifleman. He also participated in the destruction of Almeida but wasn't mentioned in Sharpe's Gold and also partook in Sharpe's Escape during the battle of Bussaco. He partook in the Battle of Fuentes de Oñoro in and went to fight with Sharpe in the Siege of Ciudad Rodrigo and the Siege of Badajoz. He went on to fight in the Battle of Salamanca in Sharpe's Sword but he wasn't mentioned. Sims went onto fight alongside Sharpe in Sharpe's Enemy but he wasn't mentioned at all. Sims wasn't mentioned in Sharpe's Honour, Regiment, Christmas, Siege, Revenge, or Waterloo. Either Sims did not fight at Waterloo or he was killed prior to the battle. Sims was often referred to in the novels as the usual grumbler and a troublemaker along with his friends Williamson, Tarrant, Cresacre, Donnelly, Gataker and once upon a time Harper.

Rifleman Sims never appeared in the TV series adaptations.

=== Skillicorn ===
Skillicorn
- First appearance: Sharpe's Gold (Series)
- Last appearance: Sharpe's Gold (Series)
- Created by: Bernard Cornwell
- Portrayed by: Philip Dowd

In-universe information
- Title: Rifleman
- Occupation: Soldier
- Nationality: English

Rifleman Skillicorn appears in Sharpe's Gold. Skillicorn was born in Liverpool and had a distinctive scouse accent.

In the novels, the role of Skillicorn stealing a chicken is given to Private Batten.

In the TV episode Sharpe's Gold, the role of Skillicorn was portrayed by Philip Dowd. Rifleman Skillicorn was executed by hanging for the stealing of a chicken by the Provost under Lieutenant Ayres.

=== Fergus Slattery ===
Fergus Slattery
- First appearance: Sharpe's Havoc (Novels)
- Last appearance: Sharpe's Fury (Novels)
- Created by: Bernard Cornwell

In-universe information
- Nickname: Slatts
- Title: Rifleman
- Occupation: Soldier
- Nationality: Irish

Rifleman Fergus Slattery is one of the original riflemen who was involved in the retreat to Corunna in Sharpe's Rifles though he was not mentioned in the novel. Rifleman Slattery was mentioned in Sharpe's Havoc where he fought in the First Battle of Oporto and also partook in the Second Battle of Oporto which he survived. He also featured in Sharpe's Eagle where Slattery fought with Sharpe in the Battle at Talavera. He also participated in the destruction of Almeida but wasn't mentioned in Sharpe's Gold and also appeared in Sharpe's Escape where he was almost put under arrest for looking at Captain Slingsby funny. In Sharpe's Fury Slattery along with Sharpe, Harper, Hagman, Harris and Perkins were involved in the battle of Barrosa where Slattery was shot in the throat and died. Slattery was described as being a quiet and softly spoken man from County Wicklow. The novels also described him as a very capable rifleman who attended Mass on a regular basis even though he was not Catholic. He previously served in the 48th Northamptonshire regiment as a servant to Captain Murray. When Murray transferred to the 95th Rifles, he took Slattery with him.

Rifleman Slattery never appeared in the TV series adaptations.

=== Smith ===
Smith
- First appearance: Sharpe's Battle (Novels)
- Last appearance: Sharpe's Company (Novels)
- Created by: Bernard Cornwell

In-universe information
- Nickname: Smithy
- Title: Rifleman
- Occupation: Soldier
- Nationality: English

Rifleman Smith first appeared in Sharpe's Battle however he would have accompanied Sharpe in the retreat to Corunna but was he was never mentioned in Sharpe's Rifles. He fought in the First Battle of Oporto and also partook in the Second Battle of Oporto which he survived. Smith fought with Sharpe in the Battle at Talavera although he was not mentioned in Sharpe's Eagle. He also participated in the destruction of Almeida but wasn't mentioned in Sharpe's Gold and also partook in Sharpe's Escape during the battle of Bussaco. He partook in the Battle of Fuentes de Oñoro in and went to fight with Sharpe in the Siege of Ciudad Rodrigo and the Siege of Badajoz. He went on to fight in the Battle of Salamanca in Sharpe's Sword but he wasn't mentioned. Smith went onto fight alongside Sharpe in Sharpe's Enemy but he wasn't mentioned at all. Smith wasn't mentioned in Sharpe's Honour, Regiment, Christmas, Siege, Revenge, or Waterloo. Either Smith did not fight at Waterloo or he was killed prior to the battle.

Rifleman Smith never appeared in the TV series adaptations.

=== Ned Tarrant ===
Ned Tarrant
- First appearance: Sharpe's Havoc (Novels)
- Last appearance: Sharpe's Havoc (Novels)
- Created by: Bernard Cornwell

In-universe information
- Title: Rifleman
- Occupation: Soldier
- Nationality: English

Rifleman Ned Tarrant is one of the original riflemen who was involved in the retreat to Corunna in Sharpe's Rifles though he was not mentioned in the novel. Rifleman Tarrant was mentioned in Sharpe's Havoc where he was wounded in action after the French victory at Oporto. He was shot in the hip and was unable to walk. Sharpe made the decision to leave him behind believing Tarrant would slow them down. Tarrant's fate is unknown either being killed or captured by the enemy or left to die. Ned Tarrant was described as being a trouble maker and a sullen man from Hertfordshire who never lost a chance to become drunk or vicious, but when he was sober he was a good marksmen who did not lose his head in battle. It is noted that Tarrent was the ring leader of the troublemakers which included Sims, Williamson, Donnelly, Cresacre, Gataker and once upon a time Harper.

Rifleman Tarrant never appeared in the TV series adaptations.

=== Thompson ===
Thompson
- First appearance: Sharpe's Battle (Novels)
- Last appearance: Sharpe's Battle (Novels)
- Created by: Bernard Cornwell

In-universe information
- Title: Rifleman
- Occupation: Soldier
- Nationality: English

Rifleman Thompson first appeared in Sharpe's Battle however he would have accompanied Sharpe in the retreat to Corunna but was he was never mentioned in Sharpe's Rifles. Thompson fought in the First Battle of Oporto and also partook in the Second Battle of Oporto in Sharpe's Havoc which he survived. Thompson fought with Sharpe in the Battle at Talavera where Sharpe captured a French Eagle. He also participated in the destruction of Almeida in Sharpe's Gold and also partook in Sharpe's Escape during the battle of Bussaco. Thompson was killed in Sharpe's Battle where he was shot in the head by a sharpshooter whilst on watch at a fort. Sharpe classed Thompson as one of his four best marksmen along with Hagman, Cooper and Harris.

Rifleman Thompson never appeared in the TV series adaptations.

=== Isaiah Tongue ===
Isaiah Tongue
- First appearance: Sharpe's Rifles (Novels) Sharpe's Rifles (Series)
- Last appearance: Sharpe's Gold (Novels) Sharpe's Eagle (Series)
- Created by: Bernard Cornwell
- Portrayed by: Paul Trussel

In-universe information
- Title: Chosen Man
- Occupation: Soldier
- Nationality: English

Rifleman Isaiah Tongue first appeared in Sharpe's Rifles where he accompanied Sharpe in the retreat to Corunna. He is described as being from London, educated but the worst drunkard in the company; expressed once as "educated in books and alcohol." Tongue fought in the First Battle of Porto and also partook in the Second Battle of Porto in Sharpe's Havoc which he survived. Tongue fought with Sharpe in the Battle at Talavera where Sharpe captured a French Eagle. He also appeared in Sharpe's Gold where he was killed during an ambush by the French; while trying to shout a warning to Sharpe and the rest of the rifles, he was shot in the ribs. His best friend and partner in battle Parry Jenkins felt awful about Tongue's death, however Sharpe did his best to tell Jenkins it was not his fault. In the TV series, Tongue was played by Paul Trussell, appearing in the first two episodes, Sharpe's Rifles and Sharpe's Eagle.

=== Williams ===
Williams
- First appearance: Sharpe's Rifles (Novels) Sharpe's Rifles (Series)
- Last appearance: Sharpe's Rifles (Novels) Sharpe's Rifles (Series)
- Created by: Bernard Cornwell
- Portrayed by: Richard Ireson

In-universe information
- Title: Sergeant
- Occupation: Soldier
- Nationality: English

Sergeant Williams is one of the original riflemen who was involved in the retreat to Corunna in Sharpe's Rifles. He was killed in action being shot in the eye during the retreat (unlike in the book, where he is strangled). He is described as being nervous, unable to assert authority, and caring too much about being liked. Sharpe believed he did not possess the qualities to be sergeant. After his death, Rifleman Patrick Harper was promoted to sergeant to replace him.

In the television adaption Sergeant Williams was played by Richard Ireson.

=== John Williamson ===
Williamson
- First appearance: Sharpe's Havoc (Novels)
- Last appearance: Sharpe's Havoc (Novels)
- Created by: Bernard Cornwell

In-universe information
- Title: Rifleman
- Occupation: Soldier
- Nationality: English

Rifleman John Williamson is one of the original riflemen who was involved in the retreat to Corunna in Sharpe's Rifles though he was not mentioned in the novel. Rifleman Williamson was mentioned in Sharpe's Havoc where he disagreed with Sharpe's decision to leave behind his friend Rifleman Tarrant who has been wounded and unable to walk. This left Williamson resenting Sharpe and eventually deserting. Williamson was eventually killed by Sharpe for his betrayal. Rifleman Williamson was described as a grumbler and a troublemaker alongside his friend Ned Tarrant.

Rifleman Williamson never appeared in the TV series adaptations.

== 60th Royal American Rifles ==
=== Cross ===
Cross
- First appearance: Sharpe's Enemy (Novels)
- Created by: Bernard Cornwell

In-universe information
- Title: Captain
- Occupation: Army Officer
- Nationality: English

Captain Cross was a junior captain in the 60th Royal Americans. He was burlier than his senior, Captain Frederickson, but lacked confidence. In Sharpe's Enemy, Cross' company joined with Captain Frederickson's company on a mission to The Gateway of God outside Adrados. After the convent was captured, Cross' company helped secure the building, even constructing a ramp up to the lookouts on the rooftops. His company would then take part in the defense of the Gateway against a larger French force.

=== William Frederickson ===
William Frederickson
- First appearance: Sharpe's Enemy (Novels) Sharpe's Enemy (Series)
- Last appearance: Sharpe's Revenge (Novels) Sharpe's Revenge (Series)
- Created by: Bernard Cornwell
- Portrayed by: Philip Whitchurch

In-universe information
- Nickname: "Sweet William"
- Title: Captain
- Occupation: Army Officer
- Nationality: Half English, half German

William Frederickson comes from Westphalia. Nicknamed 'Sweet William' by his men, Frederickson has suffered a serious facial wound which has destroyed his left eye, broken his jaw, knocked out several teeth, and caused nerve damage giving him an uncontrollable and permanently smug look. When fighting he takes out his false teeth (taken from dead French soldiers) and removes his wig and eye patch, to terrifying effect. He is however a cultured and sensitive man, with an informed knowledge of European architecture. He is of German and English descent and speaks both languages fluently, as well as competent French in Sharpe's Siege and Sharpe's Revenge and passable Italian in Sharpe's Revenge. Of his company of the 60th Royal American Rifles, half are German like himself, along with a quarter from Spain, and the remainder British with one sole American.

Frederickson is a close and loyal ally of Sharpe until the fallout over the affections of Lucille Castineau, who rejects Frederickson's proposal of marriage before taking Sharpe as a lover, as she is carrying his child in Sharpe's Revenge. This makes Frederickson angry at Sharpe, and ends their friendship, so he ends up leaving Sharpe. A discussion between Sharpe and Harper in the lead-up to the Battle of Waterloo indicates that Sweet William has been posted to Canada to serve in the War of 1812.

In the Sharpe adaptation, Frederickson was played by Philip Whitchurch. Instead of leaving Sharpe, he forgives him at the end of the episode.

=== Robinson ===
Robinson
- First appearance: Sharpe's Siege (Series)
- Last appearance: Sharpe's Siege (Series)
- Created by: Bernard Cornwell
- Portrayed by: Danny Cunningham

In-universe information
- Title: Rifleman
- Occupation: Soldier
- Nationality: English

Rifleman Robinson only appeared in the television series and was not mentioned by Cornwell in the novels. Sharpe's Siege Rifleman Robinson is distraught when his friend rifleman Reilly is killed by an intruder in the camp when they are on guard duty. Robinson is later found with a local French girl. Sharpe is required to hang him by Wellington's standing orders, but when the girl says she had been willing, Sharpe reduces the sentence to a beating from Sergeant Harper. Robinson is a keen rifleman and a crack shot. He boasts he is the best shot in the brigade but Hagman proves him wrong. When Sharpe asked his men their opinions before defending the fort, Robinson replied 'fight them to the death' still angered by the death of his friend Reilly.

=== Reilly ===
Reilly
- First appearance: Sharpe's Siege (Series)
- Last appearance: Sharpe's Siege (Series)
- Created by: Bernard Cornwell
- Portrayed by: J. D. Kelleher

In-universe information
- Title: Rifleman
- Occupation: Soldier
- Nationality: Irish

Rifleman Reilly first appeared in Sharpe's Siege when trying to fake illness so he did not have to march. He was friends with rifleman Robinson and partnered each other in battle. Reilly was unfortunately killed whilst on guard duty when Robinson took badly. Reilly was not mentioned by Cornwell in the novels.

=== Rossner ===
Rossner
- First appearance: Sharpe's Enemy (Novels) Sharpe's Enemy (Series)
- Last appearance: Sharpe's Siege (Novels) Sharpe's Enemy (Series)
- Created by: Bernard Cornwell
- Portrayed by: Iain Glass

In-universe information
- Title: Sergeant
- Occupation: Soldier
- Nationality: Half English, half German

Sergeant Rossner was a rifleman in the 60th Royal American Rifles. He was a reliable soldier often accompanying Frederickson into battle. He was huge and tall and a good fighter. Like Frederickson he was half German, half English. In the television series he was played by Iain Glass.

=== Thomas Taylor ===
Thomas Taylor
- First appearance: Sharpe's Enemy (Novels) Sharpe's Enemy (Series)
- Last appearance: Sharpe's Siege (Novels) Sharpe's Enemy (Series)
- Created by: Bernard Cornwell

In-universe information
- Title: Rifleman
- Occupation: Sailor, Soldier
- Nationality: American

Rifleman Thomas Taylor is an American rifleman from Tennessee. During the events of Sharpe's Siege he leaves the 60th Rifles to join the American privateer Captain Cornelius Killick. In the television series he beats Rifleman Perkins in a shooting competition.

== South Essex (Prince of Wales Own Volunteers) ==
=== Angel ===
Angel
- First appearance: Sharpe's Honour (Novels)
- Last appearance: Sharpe's Regiment (Novels)
- Created by: Bernard Cornwell

In-universe information
- Title: Private
- Occupation: Guide, Soldier
- Nationality: Spanish

Private Angel is a Spanish boy who acts as Sharpe's guide on his dangerous mission in Sharpe's Honour. His consuming hatred for the French leads him to join the South Essex Light Company and fight until the French are finally driven out of Spain.

=== Batten ===
Batten
- First appearance: Sharpe's Gold (Novels)
- Last appearance: Sharpe's Sword (Novels)
- Created by: Bernard Cornwell

In-universe information
- Title: Private
- Occupation: Soldier
- Nationality: English

Private Batten is a soldier in the South Essex Regiment, later renamed The Prince of Wales Own Volunteers. He is in the Light Company commanded by Sharpe. Batten first appeared in Sharpe's Gold, where he is caught by a provost for stealing a chicken. He is described as a useless soldier known for his grumbling and whining, and complains about Sharpe in Sharpe's Sword.

=== Berkeley ===
Berkeley
- First appearance: Sharpe's Sword (Series)
- Last appearance: Sharpe's Sword (Series)
- Portrayed by: Stephen Moore

In-universe information
- Title: Colonel
- Occupation: British Officer
- Nationality: English

Colonel Berkeley is the commanding officer of the South Essex in Sharpe's Sword, during the early stages of the attack on Villafranca. Berkeley is friendly towards Sharpe, a reasonable and amiable man if occasionally overly officious. He grants parole to Philippe Leroux, who poses as a French captain. Sharpe, suspicious, attempts to convince Berkeley to revoke Leroux's parole and hold him in custody until Munro can investigate his identity. Berkeley is almost convinced by Sharpe pointing out the uniform supposedly belonging to a dead colonel fits Leroux better than the one he wears, but is fooled when Leroux, with Jack Spears acting as his advocate, claiming he could not afford a uniform that fit.

Approaching Villafranca, French cannon fire causes a distraction as Leroux is being escorted away by Ensign McDonald. Leroux kills McDonald and escapes to the fort. Furious at Leroux's violation of his parole, Berkeley vows to take the fortress that night and see Leroux dead by morning.

After spending the rest of the day at the British-allied town, Berkeley leads a night assault on the French fort. Simmerson, however, who trades with the French, warns them they are coming. Berkeley, leading from the front, is killed almost immediately with Sharpe at his side.

The character of Berkeley was created for the television adaptation, taking the place of Brian Windham from the novel. He survives slightly longer than Windham, who is killed during Leroux's escape.

=== John Berry ===
John Berry
- First appearance: Sharpe's Eagle (Novels) Sharpe's Eagle (Series)
- Last appearance: Sharpe's Waterloo (Novels)
- Created by: Bernard Cornwell
- Portrayed by: Daniel Craig

In-universe information
- Title: Lieutenant
- Occupation: Officer
- Nationality: English

Lieutenant John Berry only appeared in Sharpe's Eagle both in the novels and television series. In the novel, he is described as "overweight, with fleshy lips" and "petulant", whereas in the TV series he is reasonably fit and, although "not exactly top-drawer" (probably meaning that he's not an upper-echelon aristocrat but actually upper-middle class or even possibly a bastard son) far more worldly than his friend Gibbons, a far better gambler and far less scrupulous in getting what he wants. In the novel, Sharpe deliberately kills him the night before the Battle of Talavera in retaliation for his and Gibbons' rape of Josefina LaCosta, while in the television series he ambushes Sharpe the night before the battle in an attempt to murder him but while taunting Sharpe is himself killed by Harper; in both cases, he is presumed to have been killed by the French.

In the television series, he is portrayed by Daniel Craig.

=== Jack Bullen ===
Jack Bullen
- First appearance: Sharpe's Escape (Novels)
- Last appearance: Sharpe's Fury (Novels)
- Created by: Bernard Cornwell

In-universe information
- Title: Ensign
- Occupation: Officer
- Nationality: English

Ensign Jack Bullen first appeared in Sharpe's Escape, where he is transferred to the Light Company from Lawford's 9th Company as a replacement for Ensign Iliffe. Bullen's father is a judge and his brothers are barristers, but Bullen does not shine at school, so he is allowed to join the army. He is described as a tough, cheerful youngster. He proves himself to be a reliable officer. In Sharpe's Fury he translates for Sharpe in a parley with the French. Unfortunately, Bullen is made a prisoner by the French, violating the flag of truce and angering Sharpe. It is assumed that Bullen survives the war as a French prisoner or is part of a prisoner exchange.

=== Philip Carline ===
Philip Carline
- First appearance: Sharpe's Regiment (Novels) Sharpe's Regiment (Series)
- Last appearance: Sharpe's Waterloo (Novels) Sharpe's Regiment (Series)
- Created by: Bernard Cornwell
- Portrayed by: Adam James

In-universe information
- Title: Captain
- Occupation: Officer
- Nationality: English

Captain Philip Carline first appeared in Sharpe's Regiment. He hides the fact he is one of the officers at the recruitment camp of the South Essex, a secret and brutal training camp in Foulness, run by the second battalion's commanding officer Lieutenant-Colonel Girdwood and the regiment's disgraced founder Sir Henry Simmerson.

=== Clayton ===
Clayton
- First appearance: Sharpe's Company (Novels) Sharpe's Company (Series)
- Last appearance: Sharpe's Waterloo (Novels) Sharpe's Company (Series)
- Created by: Bernard Cornwell
- Portrayed by: Peter Gunn

In-universe information
- Title: Private
- Occupation: Soldier
- Spouse: Sally Clayton
- Nationality: English

Private Clayton is a soldier in the South Essex Regiment, later to be known as The Prince of Wales Own Volunteers. A former footman at a country estate, he is part of the light company commanded by Sharpe, often assisting with company bookwork. Clayton first appeared in Sharpe's Company when Sharpe's riflemen were attach to the Light Company of the South Essex. He would have fought with Sharpe in the Battle at Talavera in Sharpe's Eagle. He also participates in the destruction of Almeida but is not mentioned in Sharpe's Gold and also partakes in Sharpe's Escape during the Battle of Bussaco. Clayton is involved in the sieges of Ciudad Rodrigo and Badajoz and goes on to fight in the Battle of Salamanca in Sharpe's Sword. In the novels, he is killed at the Battle of Waterloo alongside Rifleman Hagman.

=== Jack Collett ===
Jack Collett
- First appearance: Sharpe's Company (Novels) Sharpe's Company (Series)
- Last appearance: Sharpe's Company (Novels) Sharpe's Company (Series)
- Created by: Bernard Cornwell
- Portrayed by: Robert Morgan

In-universe information
- Title: Major
- Occupation: British Officer
- Nationality: English

Major Jack Collett is described as a small man with a clipped mustache, cropped grey hair, with bowed horseman's legs, and leathery skin, but lacking his colonel's shrewdness. As a friend of the South Essex's new commanding officer, Brian Windham, he takes the vacant majority that otherwise would have gone to senior captain, Thomas Leroy. He agrees with Major Forrest's decision to leave Sharpe in temporary command of the Light Company after the arrival of Rymer, leaving Windham the job of demoting Sharpe to lieutenant.

Collett is often seen at Windham's side, organising parades for him. He loses a watch and a silver shaving mirror when Hakeswill robs the baggage train. He led half the battalion - later increased to six companies by reinforcements - in protecting engineers making a failed attempt to blow the dam near Badajoz. He is killed early on during the assault on Badjoz, his neck severed by roundshot (Sharpe's Company).

In the television adaptation of Sharpe's Company, there is no significant difference to Collett's character. Like Windham, he is friendly towards Sharpe but unsure how to treat an officer who rose from the ranks. He shakes hands with Sharpe when he is temporary assigned away from the battalion. He quickly picks up on Price's fondness for drink.

During the assault on the breach at Badajoz, he is shot dead by one of the French defenders, grieving Windham.

=== Collip ===
Collip
- First appearance: Sharpe's Honour (Novels)
- Last appearance: Sharpe's Honour (Novels)
- Created by: Bernard Cornwell

In-universe information
- Title: Ensign
- Occupation: Officer
- Nationality: English

Ensign Collip first appeared in Sharpe's Honour as Sharpe's new quartermaster. Sharpe is not impressed with Collip's abilities as quartermaster, having to watch over him constantly. Collip is described as an inexperienced plump officer.

=== Peter D'Alembord ===
Peter D'Alembord
- First appearance: Sharpe's Honour (Novels) Sharpe's Honour (Series)
- Last appearance: Sharpe's Waterloo (Novels) Sharpe's Honour (Series)
- Created by: Bernard Cornwell
- Portrayed by: Edward Atterton

In-universe information
- Nickname: "Dally"
- Title: Major (highest rank achieved)
- Occupation: British Army Officer
- Religion: Protestant (Huguenot)
- Nationality: British, of French descent

Major Peter D'Alembord, nicknamed "Dally," joins the British Army after killing a man in a duel over a woman's favours. He is of French Huguenot extraction and enters the South Essex Regiment as one of Sharpe's many Light Company subalterns. D'Alembord becomes Captain of the South Essex Light Company after Sharpe's promotion to major. He helps Sharpe during Sharpe's Regiment, helping Sharpe find the missing Second Battalion, and again in Sharpe's Revenge, finding and talking to Jane Sharpe in London. After Napoleon's return from Elba, D'Alembord returns to the Prince of Wales' Own Volunteers on the hope of being promoted to major. Just prior to the Battle of Waterloo, he has a strong premonition of his death. After receiving his hoped-for promotion, Dally is badly injured in the fighting and has to have his leg amputated, but survives and is granted command of the battalion after Sharpe's retirement at the end of the war despite his "gammy leg."

In the Sharpe television series, his only appearance is in Sharpe's Honour, where he was portrayed by the uncredited Edward Atterton.

=== Christopher Denny ===
Christopher Denny
- First appearance: Sharpe's Eagle (Novels) Sharpe's Company (Series)
- Last appearance: Sharpe's Eagle (Novels) Sharpe's Company (Series)
- Created by: Bernard Cornwell

In-universe information
- Title: Ensign
- Occupation: Officer
- Nationality: English

Ensign Christopher Denny first appeared in Sharpe's Eagle. He accompanied Sharpe and Harper when they broke through the French lines to capture the eagle, and was killed during the fighting.

In the Sharpe television series, his only appearance is in Sharpe's Eagle, where he is portrayed by Nolan Hemmings.

=== Dobbs ===
Dobbs
- First appearance: Sharpe's Eagle (Series)
- Last appearance: Sharpe's Eagle (Series)
- Created by: Bernard Cornwell
- Portrayed by: Paul Bigley

In-universe information
- Title: Private
- Occupation: Soldier
- Nationality: English

Private Dobbs was a soldier in the South Essex Regiment, later to be known as The Prince of Wales' Own Volunteers, first appearing in Sharpe's Eagle. He was part of the light company commanded by originally by Major Lennox, then by Captain Leroy and finally by Sharpe, where he was flogged on Simmerson's orders for collapsing from exhaustion while on parade. He later proved his worth by being able (while still recovering from his flogging) to fire four shots a minute in Sharpe's special musket drill and surviving the battle of Talavera while assisting in capturing the Eagle. Sharpe acknowledged Dobbs' abilities by asking if he would like to join the Rifles; while Dobbs accepted Sharpe's offer, he did not appear in any other episodes.

=== Joseph Ford ===
Joseph Ford
- First appearance: Sharpe's Waterloo (Novels) Sharpe's Waterloo (Series)
- Last appearance: Sharpe's Waterloo (Novels) Sharpe's Waterloo (Series)
- Created by: Bernard Cornwell
- Portrayed by: Shaughan Seymour

In-universe information
- Title: Lieutenant Colonel
- Occupation: British Army Officer
- Nationality: British

Lieutenant Colonel Joseph Ford is not a military man, but a wealthy landowner who purchases a commission as lieutenant colonel of the Prince of Wales Own Volunteers in the peace of 1814–1815, which he subsequently commands during the engagement at Quatre Bras and at the Battle of Waterloo. He is not confident in command and relies on the support of other under-experienced senior officers, Major Micklethwaite and Major Vine, both of whom are killed in the course of the campaign. Only the timely intervention of Richard Sharpe and his fellow Peninsula veteran, Major Peter d'Alembord saves the regiment from the twin threats of the incompetent command of the Prince of Orange and an attack by Napoleon's Imperial Guard.

In the television adaptation, he was portrayed by Shaughan Seymour.

=== Christian Gibbons ===
Christian Gibbons
- First appearance: Sharpe's Eagle (Novels) Sharpe's Eagle (Series)
- Last appearance: Sharpe's Eagle (Novels) Sharpe's Eagle (Series)
- Created by: Bernard Cornwell
- Portrayed by: Neil Dudgeon

In-universe information
- Title: Lieutenant
- Occupation: British Army Officer
- Nationality: British

Christian Gibbons is a British Army officer in the South Essex as a lieutenant, and Sir Henry Simmerson's nephew. In the novel Sharpe's Eagle, he appears to be the senior of the two lieutenants of the South Essex that Sir Henry Simmerson brings with him (the other being his friend Berry). In the television series, his character appears to be that a slack-jawed dilettante with a weak vaccilating character and he constantly loses when gambling with Berry. forcing him to go to his uncle to help pay off his losses. He and Berry rape Josefina LaCosta as a way of getting back at Sharpe, and in the book he seems to guess that Sharpe killed Berry, In the novel, he is killed by Patrick Harper after the Battle of Talavera when Gibbons ambushes Sharpe in an attempt to kill him and steal the captured Eagle, and Sharpe takes a locket from him which contains a picture of his sister Jane Gibbons whom Sharpe later marries; in the television series, he flees after his uncle at the start of the battle and is not seen or heard of again throughout the series.

In the television series, he is played by Neil Dudgeon.

=== Bartholomew Girdwood ===
Bartholomew Girdwood
- First appearance: Sharpe's Regiment (Novels) Sharpe's Regiment (Series)
- Last appearance: Sharpe's Regiment (Novels) Sharpe's Regiment (Series)
- Created by: Bernard Cornwell
- Portrayed by: Mark Lambert

In-universe information
- Title: Lieutenant Colonel
- Occupation: British Army Officer
- Religion: Protestant
- Nationality: British

Bartholomew Girdwood is a British Army officer, the nominal commander of the South Essex Regiment's Second Battalion and later the first commanding officer of the regiment after its renaming as the "Prince of Wales' Own Volunteers."

Girdwood served as a captain in Ireland during the United Irish rebellion of 1798. While on patrol he became lost and was ambushed. The court of inquiry at Dublin Castle dismissed him on half pay, effectively ending his military career. Some 10 years later Girdwood was recruited by Sir Henry Simmerson, whom he had taken his reprimand to, and Lord Simon Fenner, who promoted him to Major, and then to Lieutenant Colonel and appointed him to command Second Battalion of the South Essex Regiment, a cover for an extensive financial fraud and crimping scheme. Girdwood is also betrothed to Simmerson's orphaned niece, Jane Gibbons. The scheme is discovered in 1813 by, Major Richard Sharpe, when he returns to England seeking reinforcements for the Regiment's First Battalion in Spain. With the help of Regimental Sergeant Major Patrick Harper, Sharpe, under an assumed identity, tracks the South Essex's recruiting parties to a secret training camp on Foulness Island, where he observes the new recruits being brutalised, cheated and auctioned to other, less popular regiments. When Harper intervenes to protest the summary execution of a deserter, he and Sharpe are hunted through the Foulness marshes by Girdwood and his fellow officers. Sharpe returns to the camp and removes Girdwood from command. Girdwood escapes and Sharpe attempts to follow his trail to evidence that will implicate Simmerson and his allies in Government. After discrediting Simmerson and saving the battalion, Sharpe retains Girdwood as the nominal commander of the South Essex. On his first experience of battle, a relatively minor engagement in the Pyrenees, Girdwood suffers a complete mental breakdown and is invalided home.

Girdwood is punctilious in his dress and military protocol, modelling himself on the reforming military king Frederick the Great of Prussia, to the extent of stiffening his moustache with hot pitch. He harbours irrational fears of the Irish and of dogs and writes poetry which glorifies the art of war. The contrast between his image of himself as a great military leader and the reality of battle leads to his breakdown.

In the TV adaption, Girdwood was played by Mark Lambert.

=== Gutteridge ===
Gutteridge
- First appearance: Sharpe's Eagle (Novels)
- Last appearance: Sharpe's Company (Novels)
- Created by: Bernard Cornwell

In-universe information
- Title: Private
- Occupation: Soldier
- Nationality: English

Private Gutteridge was a soldier in the South Essex Regiment, later to be known as The Prince of Wales' Own Volunteers. He is part of the Light Company commanded by Sharpe. Gutteridge first appeared in Sharpe's Eagle when Sharpe's riflemen were attached to the Light Company of the South Essex and would have fought with Sharpe in the Battle at Talavera in Sharpe's Eagle. He also participated in the destruction of Almeida but wasn't mentioned in Sharpe's Gold and also partook in Sharpe's Escape during the battle of Bussaco. Gutteridge was involved in the Siege of Ciudad Rodrigo and the Siege of Badajoz and went on to fight in the Battle of Salamanca in Sharpe's Sword. Gutteridge wasn't mentioned in Sharpe's Enemy, Honour, Regiment, Christmas, Siege, Revenge or Waterloo.

=== Obadiah Hakeswill ===
Obadiah Hakeswill
- First appearance: Sharpe's Tiger (Novels) Sharpe's Company (Series)
- Last appearance: Sharpe's Enemy (Novels) Sharpe's Enemy (Series)
- Created by: Bernard Cornwell
- Portrayed by: Pete Postlethwaite

In-universe information
- Title: Sergeant
- Occupation: Soldier
- Family: Biddy Hakeswill (mother)
- Children: Barabbas Hakeswill (TV series only)
- Nationality: English

Obadiah Hakeswill is a fictional character who appears in several of the Sharpe books by Bernard Cornwell.

Hakeswill's early history is related in every novel in which he appears. He was raised by his mother, Biddy, in an unknown "dale" town in England, where he sexually assaulted a parson's daughter. To protect the girl's reputation, he was charged and convicted of stealing a sheep and sentenced to death by public hanging. On the day of his execution, the hangman hoisted the numerous victims into the air to die by strangulation, for the amusement of the crowd, and paid little attention to the small boy struggling at the far end of the scaffold. When a heavy rainstorm scattered both executioner and crowd, Hakeswill's uncle was able to cut the boy from the scaffold "for his mother's sake". Hakeswill fled south and enlisted in the 33rd Regiment of Foot as a drummer boy.

As a result of this close encounter with death, Hakeswill was convinced that he was unkillable and protected by God and the spirit of his mother. He extended this reverence to mothers in general, "Mothers were sacred... Mothers were Obadiah Hakeswill's guardian angels" (Sharpe's Tiger) and in Sharpe's Enemy, he protects his hostage Josefina LaCosta when she lies that she came to a church in the town of Adrados to pray for the health of her own mother. Sharpe's Enemy also hints that Hakeswill's mother was actually abusive of him before his hanging, but those memories have been eclipsed by his belief that she sent his uncle to save him.

The hanging left him with a thick dark scar around his neck and uncontrollable facial tics.

Hakeswill gains promotion to sergeant by brutalising the lower ranks and pandering to the whims and vanity of less experienced officers. Outwardly he is punctilious in his military routine and obsequious towards officers, who find him very useful for keeping order among their soldiers. Thus protected, Hakeswill is free to terrorize the soldiers in his units, forcing them to bribe him to avoid floggings for imaginary infractions and forcing their wives to have sex with him to protect their husbands.

In the early 1790s he recruits the young Richard Sharpe into the 33rd from a public house in Sheffield.

In subsequent campaigns in Flanders and India, Hakeswill torments Sharpe, until in 1799 he conspires with Captain Charles Morris to have Sharpe flogged to death (Sharpe's Tiger).

Although Sharpe escapes with "only" 202 of the assigned 2000 lashes after an intervention by Sir Arthur Wellesley, Hakeswill continues to pursue a vendetta against him for the next three years, during which he betrays Sharpe and Lawford to Tipoo Sultan (Sharpe's Tiger), falsifies a second assault charge and murders Sharpe's friend and mentor Hector McCandless (Sharpe's Triumph). He later kidnaps Sharpe and sells him to a corrupt merchant and finally deserts to join the turncoat William Dodd at Gawilghur in Sharpe's Fortress. After Gawilghur is captured by Major General Arthur Wellesley, Hakeswill rejoins the British forces. At one point, he also serves in the Fever Islands, where he contracts Yellow fever, the result of which stains his skin yellow.

Hakeswill reappears in Sharpe's life in 1812, in the novel Sharpe's Company, as a sergeant in the new draft of the South Essex Regiment, in which Sharpe has risen to the rank of captain. He is quick to resume the vendetta, conspiring to have Sharpe's friend and ally Patrick Harper flogged and demoted and disarming Sharpe's remaining riflemen. He also attempts to rape Sharpe's wife, Teresa Moreno and plots to assault her during the sack of Badajoz, murdering Captain Robert Knowles in the process. He has also stolen the portrait of the Colonel's wife, strangely believing it to be his mother, and constantly talks into the portrait, stored in the top of his shako.

His evil finally exposed, Hakeswill deserts from the army once again, joining a band of cross-national deserters on the Portuguese border, led by the Frenchman Deron, known as "Marshal Pot-au-Feu". He is captured by the now Major Sharpe during an operation to release hostages, but escapes to shoot and kill Teresa. Hakeswill surrenders to a French officer, Colonel Alexandre Dubreton who, disgusted by his actions, hands him back to Sharpe.

Hakeswill is finally executed by firing squad, while Sharpe looks on.

The novels record at least four unsuccessful attempts by Sharpe and/or Harper to kill Hakeswill, which lend weight to the latter's conviction that he cannot die:

- Confining him in a courtyard with six tigers (Sharpe's Tiger)
- Ordering an elephant trained as an executioner to trample him (Sharpe's Triumph)
- Throwing him into a pit inhabited by venomous snakes (Sharpe's Fortress)
- Harper shooting him through a window in Badajoz, with a seven-barrelled Nock gun (Sharpe's Company)

However, it can be argued that the first three incidents are not serious attempts at murder; Sharpe is aware that the Tipoo's tigers are not invariably savage after seeing Colonel Gudin stroke one some days earlier; does not give the elephant the final command needed to crush Hakeswill; and is not familiar with the snake pit at Gawilghur. He is not aware at this time that Hakeswill has murdered McCandless and seems to prefer to torment the living Hakeswill with his own continued survival.

Only after the murder of Knowles and Hakeswill's threat to kill his infant daughter does Sharpe seek Hakeswill's death, and even then chooses to bring him to justice within the formal structures of the British Army. He feels that Hakeswill has victimised so many people that their families deserve to know that Hakeswill died after a fair legal process.

Author Bernard Cornwell has admitted that he regrets finishing the character off, as he has struggled since to create an antagonist of equal depravity and energy.

In the TV adaptations, Sergeant Obadiah Hakeswill was played by Pete Postlethwaite. His character follows a similar arc to the later novels, including his framing of Harper, attack on Teresa, desertion and eventual capture and execution. It is revealed in Sharpe's Peril that he has a son – Corporal Barabbus Hakeswill (portrayed by Amit Behl) – whom Sharpe initially distrusts but eventually proves to be a useful ally.

In the popular post-apocalyptic role playing game Fallout 2, a character by the name of Obidiah Hakeswill resides in the town of Redding. In the side quest to aid the sheriff, the player can choose to bring Obadiah to justice for cutting up the face of a prostitute. Besides their somewhat sociopathic nature, Obadiah and Obidiah share a scar around their necks and obsession with their mothers and a belief in their own invincibility.

=== Huckfield ===
Huckfield
- First appearance: Sharpe's Eagle (Novels)
- Last appearance: Sharpe's Waterloo (Novels)
- Created by: Bernard Cornwell

In-universe information
- Title: Colour Sergeant
- Occupation: Soldier
- Nationality: English

Colour Sergeant Huckfield was a soldier in the South Essex Regiment, later to be known as The Prince of Wales Own Volunteers. He was part of the light company commanded by Sharpe. Huckfield first appeared in Sharpe's Eagle as a private soldier when Sharpe's riflemen were attached to the light company of the South Essex. He would have fought with Sharpe in the Battle at Talavera in Sharpe's Eagle. He also participated in the destruction of Almeida but wasn't mentioned in Sharpe's Gold and also partook in Sharpe's Escape during the battle of Bussaco. Huckfield was involved in the Siege of Ciudad Rodrigo and the Siege of Badajoz and went on to fight in the Battle of Salamanca in Sharpe's Sword where by then he had made the rank of sergeant. By the time of the Battle of Waterloo, Huckfield had achieved the rank of Colour Sergeant Major. Huckfield was described in the novels as being educated, previously being employed as a clerk in a foundry that made iron. He was from Shropshire and volunteered to join the army to escape encroaching industrialisation of his native Midlands.

=== Iliffe ===
Iliffe
- First appearance: Sharpe's Escape (Novels)
- Last appearance: Sharpe's Escape (Novels)

In-universe information
- Title: Ensign
- Occupation: British Officer
- Nationality: English

Ensign Iliffe was an officer in the Light Company of the South Essex. He was the son of an Essex gentleman. To begin with Sharpe had not liked Iliffe, however Iliffe proved himself in battle by showing courage after previously being sick before battle. Ensign Iliffe was killed in Sharpe's Escape getting shot in the forehead.

=== Kirby ===
Kirby
- First appearance: Sharpe's Eagle (Novels)
- Last appearance: Sharpe's Escape (Novels)
- Created by: Bernard Cornwell

In-universe information
- Title: Private
- Occupation: Soldier
- Nationality: English

Private Kirby was a soldier in the South Essex Regiment, later to be known as The Prince of Wales Own Volunteers. He part of the light company commanded by Sharpe. Kirby first appeared in Sharpe's Eagle when Sharpe's riflemen were attach to the light company of the South Essex. He would have fought with Sharpe in the Battle at Talavera in Sharpe's Eagle. He also participated in the destruction of Almeida but wasn't mentioned in Sharpe's Gold and also partook in Sharpe's Escape during the battle of Bussaco. Kirby would have been involved in the Siege of Ciudad Rodrigo and the Siege of Badajoz. He went on to fight in the Battle of Salamanca in [Sharpe's Sword] but he wasn't mentioned. Kirby wasn't mentioned in Sharpe's Enemy, Honour, Regiment, Christmas, Siege, Revenge, or Waterloo. Kirby was described as a small man who had lost most of his teeth.

=== Robert Knowles ===
Robert Knowles
- First appearance: Sharpe's Eagle (Novels)
- Last appearance: Sharpe's Company (Novels)
- Created by: Bernard Cornwell

In-universe information
- Occupation: British Army Officer
- Nationality: British

Captain Robert Knowles first appears in Sharpe's Eagle as an inexperienced lieutenant in the Light Company of the South Essex Regiment. He is one of the handful of officers who sides with Lieutenant Richard Sharpe in his feud with Sir Henry Simmerson, quickly recognising Sharpe's abilities as a soldier and adopting him as a role model.

Knowles plays a significant role in the recovery of stolen Spanish gold behind enemy lines in Sharpe's Gold and is shortly afterwards appointed as Adjutant to Lt Colonel William Lawford, the South Essex's senior officer (Sharpe's Escape).

By early 1812 Knowles has purchased a captaincy in an unnamed Fusilier regiment, but is on hand to assist Lawford when the latter is seriously injured during the storming of Ciudad Rodrigo (Sharpe's Company). Knowles sympathises with Sharpe when he learns that his mentor has been demoted from captain to lieutenant and promises to protect Sharpe's lover, Teresa Moreno, who is trapped with her young child in the besieged city of Badajoz. Subsequently, Knowles takes part in a successful escalade of the castle at Badajoz (in this Cornwell has borrowed the real life achievement of a lieutenant James MacPherson). He then seeks out Teresa, but is shot and killed by Obadiah Hakeswill.

Cornwell has Knowles' unit as part of Picton's 3rd Division during the storming of Badajoz and has Knowles commanding a Light Company which Fusilier Regiments did not have. The two Fusilier Regiments involved in the battle - the 7th and the 23rd were both in the 4th Division so Knowles' "Fusilier Battalion" must be a fictitious regiment.

Knowles does not appear in the TV adaptations of the Sharpe series; his role in Sharpe's Gold was abandoned when the script was revised following an injury to the actor originally cast as Richard Sharpe, Paul McGann. In Sharpe's Company the character is combined with that of Lieutenant Harry Price and it is Price who is shot in the last minutes of the film, though his character re-appears in Sharpe's Waterloo.

=== William Lawford ===
William Lawford
- First appearance: Sharpe's Tiger (Novels) Sharpe's Rifles (Series)
- Last appearance: Sharpe's Regiment (Novels) Sharpe's Regiment
- Created by: Bernard Cornwell
- Portrayed by: Martin Jacobs, Benedict Taylor

In-universe information
- Title: Lieutenant Colonel
- Occupation: British Army Officer
- Family: Hector McCandless (uncle)
- Spouse: Jessica
- Religion: Protestant
- Nationality: Anglo-Scottish

Sir William Lawford is a fictional British officer and a character in Bernard Cornwell's Sharpe books.

Lawford is the son of a Scottish mother and English father and raised near Portsmouth in Hampshire. He is a member of the gentry and is able, with the help of his maternal uncle, Hector McCandless, to purchase a commission as a lieutenant in the 33rd Regiment of Foot. As McCandless is an officer in the East India Company, it is probable that Lawford joins the regiment, then under the command of Lieutenant Colonel Arthur Wellesley sometime after its arrival in India in 1796. He is posted to the light company under Captain Charles Morris and there meets Private Sharpe for the first time.

When McCandless, who acts as an exploring officer for the company, is captured by the forces of the Tipoo Sultan, Lawford is tasked with his rescue and chooses Sharpe to accompany him, thus saving the latter from execution by flogging.

The pair infiltrate the city of Seringapatam and, posing as deserters, are recruited into the Tipoo's army. Lawford learns to rely on and trust Sharpe's instincts and experience as a soldier to ensure the success of their mission. Unfortunately they are betrayed by Sergeant Obadiah Hakeswill and thrown into prison, where Lawford teaches Sharpe to read, using a single page of the Bible.

During the British assault on the city, Lawford and Sharpe escape and successfully detonate a mine built into the city walls, saving many British lives and ensuring a British victory.

As a result of this both men are promoted, Sharpe as a sergeant, Lawford as captain. Lawford is still in India at least as late as 1803, when his uncle is killed in the closing stages of the Battle of Assaye, but he returns at some point in the next six years.

In 1809 Lawford is part of the garrison of Dublin Castle in Ireland, but purchases a lieutenant colonelcy and transfers to Wellesley's staff in Portugal (Sharpe's Eagle). There he is reunited with Sharpe, now a lieutenant in the 95th Rifles. During the Battle of Talavera Lawford is given command of the South Essex Regiment when its commander Sir Henry Simmerson attempts to flee the field, thus once again becoming Sharpe's commanding officer.

Lawford continues in that role until early 1812, when he is gravely wounded in the assault on Ciudad Rodrigo, loses his left arm and is invalided back to Britain (Sharpe's Company).

Back in England Lawford dedicates himself to his family and political career. He is knighted and elected to parliament, seeking advancement through alliance with the ruling Tory administration. He attempts to use these contacts to extricate Sharpe from the scandals that threatens to destroy their old regiment (Sharpe's Regiment). He is mentioned by D'Alembord in Sharpe's Revenge, having spoken to him about Jane Sharpe and Lord John Rossendale, and claims they are "intimate".

Lawford is the South Essex's second commanding officer, preceded by Sir Henry Simmerson and succeeded by Colonel Brian Windham.

=== Lennox ===
Lennox
- First appearance: Sharpe's Eagle (Novels) Sharpe's Eagle (Series)
- Last appearance: Sharpe's Eagle (Novels) Sharpe's Eagle (Series)
- Created by: Bernard Cornwell
- Portrayed by: David Ashton

In-universe information
- Title: Captain (Novels) Major (Series)
- Occupation: British Army Officer
- Nationality: Scottish

Captain Lennox is an officer of the South Essex Light Company in Sharpe's Eagle. Lennox was a Scotsman, who retired after returning from India. But after losing his wife, and because a pension on half pay wasn't enough, he rejoined the army as an officer of the South Essex then being raised by Sir Henry Simmerson.

General Wellesley dispatches the South Essex, alongside Sharpe's Riflemen and the engineers of Major Hogan, to blow up the bridge at Valdelacasa, so as to protect the army's flank as they march.

During an unnecessary action against the French ordered by Simmerson, Lennox was mortally wounded, and the King's Colour was lost. As a dying request, Lennox asks Sharpe to take a French Eagle, to erase the shame of losing their own standard.

In the television adaption Lennox was a major.

=== Thomas Leroy ===
Thomas Leroy
- First appearance: Sharpe's Eagle (Novels) Sharpe's Eagle (Series)
- Last appearance: Sharpe's Honour (Novels) Sharpe's Eagle (Series)
- Created by: Bernard Cornwell
- Portrayed by: Gavan O'Herlihy

In-universe information
- Title: Lieutenant Colonel
- Occupation: British Army Officer
- Nationality: American

Lieutenant Colonel Thomas Leroy is a fictional character in the Richard Sharpe series of novels by Bernard Cornwell. He is an American Loyalist serving as an officer in the British Army during the Peninsular War.

Thomas Leroy was born in Virginia to a gentry class planter family at some point prior to the American War of Independence. As Leroy's family support the Crown, they fled first to Canada and then to Britain on the defeat of loyalist forces. In 1809, Leroy purchased a captain's commission in the fictional South Essex Regiment, where he first meets Richard Sharpe in the novel Sharpe's Eagle. During Sharpe's first mission with the South Essex, its officers quickly place themselves into one of two categories: inept, cowardly dilettantes, such as the regiment's Colonel, Sir Henry Simmerson and his nephew, Lt. Christian Gibbons and professional, or at least competent officers, such as Leroy, Major Forrest and the regiment's only veteran officer Lennox (a captain in the novel, but a major in the television adaptation).

Leroy remains with the South Essex throughout his military career, rising steadily in ranks through the Peninsular Campaign. He is present at the loss of the regiment's colours at the fictional engagement at Torrecastro and at the subsequent capture of a French Imperial Eagle at the Battle of Talavera in 1809. (Sharpe's Eagle), is severely injured in the breach at Siege of Badajoz in 1812, (Sharpe's Company), but recovers to take command of the regiment after the death of Colonel Windham shortly before the Battle of Salamanca in the same year (Sharpe's Sword). He dies in action at the Battle of Vitoria in 1813, leading the assault on the village of Gamarra-Mayor.

Leroy is the last commanding officer of the South Essex, before its change of name to the Prince of Wales' Own Volunteers, commanded by Lt. Col Bartholomew Girdwood (Sharpe's Regiment).

In the TV Adaptations, Leroy was played by Gavan O'Herlihy. The character appears only in the episode based on Sharpe's Eagle.

=== MacLaird ===
MacLaird
- First appearance: Sharpe's Honour (Novels) Sharpe's Sword (Series)
- Last appearance: Sharpe's Regiment (Novels) Sharpe's Regiment (Series)
- Created by: Bernard Cornwell

In-universe information
- Title: Regimental Sergeant Major
- Occupation: Soldier
- Nationality: Scottish

Regimental Sergeant Major MacLaird was a soldier in the South Essex Regiment. MacLaird would have fought with Sharpe in the Battle at Talavera in Sharpe's Eagle. He also participated in the destruction of Almeida but wasn't mentioned in Sharpe's Gold and also partook in Sharpe's Escape during the battle of Bussaco. MacLaird was involved in the Siege of Ciudad Rodrigo and the Siege of Badajoz and went on to fight in the Battle of Salamanca in Sharpe's Sword. MacLaird wasn't mentioned in Sharpe's Enemy but appeared at the battle of Vitoria in Sharpe's Honour. He died in Sharpe's arms a week later as the South Essex fought off a French attempt to break up the line of march to Pasajes in Sharpe's Regiment. Sharpe promoted Harper to take his place.

=== William Matthews ===
William Matthews
- First appearance: Sharpe's Company (Novels) Sharpe's Company (Series)
- Last appearance: Sharpe's Company (Novels) Sharpe's Company (Series)
- Created by: Bernard Cornwell

In-universe information
- Title: Ensign
- Occupation: Officer
- Nationality: English

Ensign William Matthews appeared in Sharpe's Company when the South Essex received reinforcements. He was killed during the siege of Badajoz by a gunpowder charge detonated by Sharpe, intended to destroy a dam to allow for an easier attack on Badajoz. He was of a rich family, and was himself a viscount.

His replacement, Ensign McDonald, was killed by Colonel Leroux when he broke his parole to escape to the French-held forts in Salamanca after being captured by Sharpe and his men.

=== McGovern ===
McGovern
- First appearance: Sharpe's Eagle (Novels)
- Last appearance: Sharpe's Honour (Novels)
- Created by: Bernard Cornwell

In-universe information
- Title: Sergeant
- Occupation: Soldier
- Nationality: Scottish

Sergeant McGovern was a sergeant in the South Essex Regiment, later The Prince of Wales Own Volunteers, as part of the Light Company commanded by Sharpe. McGovern first appeared in Sharpe's Eagle when Sharpe's riflemen were attached to the Light Company of the South Essex. He would have fought with Sharpe in the Battle at Talavera in Sharpe's Eagle. He also participated in the destruction of Almeida but wasn't mentioned in Sharpe's Gold and also partook in Sharpe's Escape during the battle of Bussaco. McGovern would have been involved in the Siege of Ciudad Rodrigo and the Siege of Badajoz. He went on to fight in the Battle of Salamanca in Sharpe's Sword but he wasn't mentioned. McGovern wasn't mentioned in Sharpe's Enemy, Honour, Regiment, Christmas, Siege, Revenge, or Waterloo. McGovern was described as a strong but slow man from Scotland with children.

=== Mellors ===
Mellors
- First appearance: Sharpe's Company (Novels)
- Last appearance: Sharpe's Sword (Novels)
- Created by: Bernard Cornwell

In-universe information
- Title: Private
- Occupation: Soldier
- Nationality: English

Private Mellors was a soldier in the South Essex Regiment, later to be known as The Prince of Wales Own Volunteers. He part of the light company commanded by Sharpe. He would have fought with Sharpe in the Battle at Talavera in Sharpe's Eagle. He also participated in the destruction of Almeida but wasn't mentioned in Sharpe's Gold and also partook in Sharpe's Escape during the battle of Bussaco. Mellors would have been involved in the Siege of Ciudad Rodrigo and the Siege of Badajoz. He went on to fight in the Battle of Salamanca in Sharpe's Sword. Mellors wasn't mentioned in Sharpe's Enemy, Honour, Regiment, Christmas, Siege, Revenge, or Waterloo. He was described as being one of the useless members of the light company along with private Batten.

=== Peters ===
Peters
- First appearance: Sharpe's Eagle (Novels)
- Last appearance: Sharpe's Company (Novels)
- Created by: Bernard Cornwell

In-universe information
- Title: Private
- Occupation: Soldier
- Nationality: English

Private Peters was a soldier in the South Essex Regiment, later to be known as The Prince of Wales Own Volunteers. He part of the light company commanded by Sharpe. Peters first appeared in Sharpe's Eagle when Sharpe's riflemen were attach to the light company of the South Essex. He would have fought with Sharpe in the Battle at Talavera in Sharpe's Eagle. He also participated in the destruction of Almeida but wasn't mentioned in Sharpe's Gold and also partook in Sharpe's Escape during the battle of Bussaco. Peters was involved in the Siege of Ciudad Rodrigo and the Siege of Badajoz guarding the gates of the chapel where Teresa was being held. He and went on to fight in the Battle of Salamanca in Sharpe's Sword. Peters wasn't mentioned in Sharpe's Enemy, Honour, Regiment, Christmas, Siege, Revenge or Waterloo. Peters is described as a huge sensible man who was older than most. Sharpe saw Peters as a sensible man and a trust worthy reliable soldier.

=== Harry Price ===
Harry Price
- First appearance: Sharpe's Company
- Last appearance: Sharpe's Assassin
- Created by: Bernard Cornwell (Series)
- Portrayed by: Scott Cleverdon; Nicholas Irons

In-universe information
- Occupation: Soldier
- Nationality: English

Harry Price is a fictional character in the Richard Sharpe stories written by Bernard Cornwell. Characters named Harry Price appeared in two episodes of the Sharpe television series, played by different actors.

Price makes his first appearance in the novel Sharpe's Company (although he has a small role in Sharpe's Battle, a novel written after but set before Sharpe's Company). He is a new lieutenant in the South Essex Regiment, serving as Sharpe's second-in-command in the light company, replacing Robert Knowles from the earlier books. He is fond of alcohol but affable and well liked by the men. He was born in Portsmouth, the son of a ship builder, but gambling debts and unwanted pregnancies with local women made his father sent him to the army, purchasing an ensign's commission, and four years later, paid £550 to promote him to Lieutenant.

Price has minor roles in the next few novels. In Sharpe's Sword, he is briefly placed in command of the light company after Sharpe is believed killed during the capture of Salamanca. He is involved in the action on the Portuguese/Spanish border in Sharpe's Enemy and is present at the Battle of Vitoria in Sharpe's Honour.

He is given a larger role in the next novel, Sharpe's Regiment, where he accompanies Sharpe, Harper and D'Alembord back to England to try to find recruits to bolster the depleted regiment. He plays a part in helping Sharpe take control of the battalion's training camp and expose a plan by corrupt officers to sell the recruits to other regiments. He then returns to Spain with the regiment, now known as the Prince of Wales' Own Volunteers, and is promoted to captain and given command of a company after Captain Thomas is killed at the Battle of Nivelle.

In Sharpe's Waterloo, he is still with the regiment and, after they suffer casualties at Quatre Bras and Waterloo, the most senior officer after Colonel Ford to escape uninjured. When Sharpe takes command of the battalion, he promotes Price to major and places him in command of the light company. Despite this, the novel Sharpe's Assassin, set immediately afterwards, portrays him as still being a captain. He accompanies Sharpe to Paris and takes part in his battle with a rogue French battalion attempting to avenge Napoleon's defeat.

Price appears in the TV adaptation Sharpe's Company, played by Scott Cleverdon. He is given a similar role to that in the book but he is shot and apparently killed by Sergeant Hakeswill during the storming of Badajoz while trying to protect Teresa, a fate that befell Captain Knowles in the book.

However, a character named Harry Price appears in Sharpe's Waterloo, played by Nicholas Irons. He talks to Sharpe and Harper and it is clear they know him quite well and that he is a veteran, possibly indicating that this is meant to be the same Harry Price from Sharpe's Company. When several soldiers are killed as a result of the Prince of Orange's incompetent orders at Quatre Bras, Price worries that his brother, who has just joined up, is among the dead. He is last seen in the closing seconds of the episode, standing alongside Sharpe as he turns back the French advance at Waterloo.

=== Read ===
Read
- First appearance: Sharpe's Eagle (Novels)
- Last appearance: Sharpe's Company (Novels)
- Created by: Bernard Cornwell

In-universe information
- Title: Sergeant
- Occupation: Soldier
- Nationality: English

Sergeant Read was a soldier in the South Essex Regiment. He part of the light company commanded by Sharpe. Read first appeared in Sharpe's Eagle when Sharpe's riflemen were attach to the light company of the South Essex. He would have fought with Sharpe in the Battle at Talavera. He also participated in the destruction of Almeida but wasn't mentioned in Sharpe's Gold and also partook in Sharpe's Escape during the battle of Bussaco. Read was involved in the Siege of Ciudad Rodrigo and the Siege of Badajoz. He was unfortunately blinded in the siege of Badajoz in Sharpe's Company. He was unable to continue as a soldier due to losing his sight and was presumably sent back home to England. Huckfield took his place as Sergeant in the light company. Read was described as a Methodist who worried about the souls of others. He never swore or drank.

=== Roach ===
Roach
- First appearance: Sharpe's Gold (Novels)
- Last appearance: Sharpe's Company (Novels)
- Created by: Bernard Cornwell

In-universe information
- Title: Private
- Occupation: Soldier
- Nationality: English

Private Roach was a soldier in the South Essex Regiment, later to be known as The Prince of Wales Own Volunteers. He part of the light company commanded by Sharpe. Roach first appeared in Sharpe's Gold when Sharpe's riflemen were attach to the light company of the South Essex. In Sharpe's Gold it mentioned that Roach pimped his wife for a shilling. He would have fought with Sharpe in the Battle at Talavera in Sharpe's Eagle. He also participated in the battle of Bussaco in Sharpe's Escape. Roach was involved in the Siege of Ciudad Rodrigo and the Siege of Badajoz and went on to fight in the Battle of Salamanca in Sharpe's Sword. Roach wasn't mentioned in Sharpe's Enemy, Honour, Regiment, Christmas, Siege, Revenge or Waterloo.

=== Sir Henry Simmerson ===
Henry Simmerson
- First appearance: Sharpe's Eagle (novels) Sharpe's Eagle (series)
- Last appearance: Sharpe's Regiment (novels) Sharpe's Peril (series)
- Created by: Bernard Cornwell
- Portrayed by: Michael Cochrane

In-universe information
- Title: Colonel
- Occupation: Officer
- Nationality: English

Colonel Sir Henry Simmerson is a recurring villain, portrayed as a stereotypical snobbish, petty and tyrannical minor English aristocrat. He is narrow-minded, militarily inept and cowardly; while he is not presented as a clever man, he does display a certain cunning and deviousness.

In his first appearance in the novels, he is described as short, squat, and red-faced giving the impression of "a pig sitting on horseback".

Simmerson first appears in Sharpe's Eagle, as commanding officer of the South Essex Regiment of the British Army, during the Talavera Campaign. Captain Michael Hogan briefly sketches Simmerson's background as a Justice of the Peace, Member of Parliament for Paglesham (a rotten borough), and a colonel in the Militia. He is also a distant cousin of General Sir Banastre Tarleton and thus has some influence at Horse Guards which serves to protect him, to a considerable extent, from the full consequences of his cowardice and military ineptitude. His considerable (inherited) wealth has allowed him to not only purchase his commission in the army, but also raise the regiment at his own expense.

Simmerson is thus portrayed as the archetype of the military dilettante allowed to hold rank and responsibility in the British Army, a type which is the constant bane of professional soldiers like Sharpe. Throughout the first novel, he consistently ignores the advice of the few professional soldiers among his officers, and blames the often disastrous consequences of his own blunders on them. He also displays blatant nepotism in favouring his nephew, Christian Gibbons, as his aide.

The South Essex is assigned the relatively easy mission of linking up with an allied Spanish regiment and escorting Hogan to a point on the River Tagus to destroy a bridge that the French could use. In a minor skirmish with a French cavalry patrol, however, Simmerson's appalling judgement leads to the loss of a substantial number of men, and the loss of one of his regiment's two colours (presented by the king and representing the regiment's honour).

At the end of the novel, when the South Essex is positioned on the British flank during the Battle of Talavera, Simmerson panics and starts to withdraw the regiment, before he is ignominiously relieved from his post by William Lawford.

He is mentioned in passing in the subsequent novels as having returned to England and resumed his political activities, in particular helping to implement the new income tax, and becomes "Commissioner of the Excise".

In 1813, (Sharpe's Regiment) Simmerson, with Lord Simon Fenner, and Lieutenant Colonel Batholomew Girdwood (whom he had promoted), uses the second battalion of the South Essex in an illegal crimping operation, recruiting men for the South Essex then selling them to posts overseas. Sharpe exposes him and presumably this is the end of his military career (Simmerson was (legally) crimping long before this and the historical notes to Sharpe's Regiment reveal this is how he obtained his commission). Sharpe also snubs Simmerson by eloping with his niece, Jane Gibbons.

In the first run of the television adaptations, Simmerson, played by Michael Cochrane, appears in Sharpe's Eagle (1993), Sharpe's Sword (1995) and Sharpe's Regiment (1996). His appearances in Eagle and Regiment remain faithful to the novel versions, while his appearance in Sword is a creation of the show's writers, since that story was largely re-vamped from the novel.

Simmerson proved to be a popular character with the viewers, and was brought back for several subsequent appearances.

In Sword he has renounced his military rank in favour of being a political commissar with the British Army in Spain (and reports that a court of inquiry found him innocent of losing the colour in Eagle). Simmerson takes a licentious interest in "Lass" (Emily Mortimer), a novice nun under Sharpe's protection, rendered mute by the trauma of watching her sisters tortured for information by a French spy. Simmerson tries, on two occasions, to rape Lass, but fails both times, due both to Lass's pluck, and the intervention of an Irish priest, who thrashes Simmerson in a sword fight. It is also implied that Simmerson betrayed a night attack attempted by the South Essex to the French, in the hopes that Sharpe would be killed.

In the revival series, Cochrane returns as Simmerson, now an officer in the army attached to the British East India Company, in the 2006 revival, Sharpe's Challenge and its 2008 sequel Sharpe's Peril.

In Peril, Simmerson is found naked, staked to the ground and is saved by Sharpe, and whether it is the severe sunstroke he has suffered or an offer of genuine friendship, becomes Sharpe's ally and commands a section of musketeers during the final assault by the 3rd Native Horse. At the end of the episode, a seemingly normal Simmerson offers his gratitude to Sharpe, with the two men shaking hands before parting ways.

=== Cornelius Slingsby ===
Cornelius Slingsby
- First appearance: Sharpe's Escape (Novels)
- Last appearance: Sharpe's Escape (Novels)
- Created by: Bernard Cornwell

In-universe information
- Title: Captain
- Occupation: Officer
- Nationality: English

Lieutenant (later brevet Captain) Cornelius Slingsby appeared in Sharpe's Escape. At 31, he is old for a lieutenant, but inexperienced, having served most of his army career in the East Indies. He is the brother-in-law of Col. Lawford's wife, Jessica, who pressures her husband to advance Slingsby's career in the South Essex (Sharpe's friend, Robert Knowles, confides that Jessica's sister was impregnated by a lover who abandoned her, and Slingsby was hastily "recruited" by her family to marry her and avoid scandal). He is assigned as second-in-command of the Light Company under Sharpe, who detests him. At Bussaco, after Sharpe rescues a detachment of the Light Company from one of Slingsby's blunders, Slingsby demands an apology for Sharpe using harsh language towards him. When Sharpe refuses, Lawford reluctantly reassigns Sharpe as a quartermaster and puts Slingsby in temporary command of the Light Company. Even Lawford quickly becomes annoyed with Slingsby, silently comparing him to a dog that barks too often, just to ensure that people are still paying attention to him. Under the pressures of his new position, Slingsby quickly breaks down, getting drunk on duty with hoarded rum. After another brief skirmish with the French in which Sharpe rescues the Light Company (again), Lawford quietly reinstates him to command, while leaving Slingsby's fate ambiguous.

=== Smith ===
Smith
- First appearance: Sharpe's Regiment (novels) Sharpe's Regiment (series)
- Last appearance: Sharpe's Waterloo (novels) Sharpe's Regiment (series)
- Created by: Bernard Cornwell
- Portrayed by: Tristram Wymark

In-universe information
- Title: Captain
- Occupation: Officer
- Nationality: English

Captain Smith first appeared in Sharpe's Regiment. He is one of the officers at the recruitment camp of the South Essex, a secret and brutal training camp in Foulness, run by the second battalion's commanding officer Lieutenant-Colonel Girdwood and the regiment's disgraced founder Sir Henry Simmerson.

=== Michael Trumper-Jones ===
Trumper-Jones
- First appearance: Sharpe's Honour (Novels) Sharpe's Honour (Series)
- Last appearance: Sharpe's Honour (Novels) Sharpe's Honour (Series)
- Created by: Bernard Cornwell
- Portrayed by: Benjamin Soames

In-universe information
- Title: Lieutenant
- Occupation: Officer
- Nationality: English

Lieutenant Michael Trumper-Jones first appears in Sharpe's Honour as an inexperienced lieutenant in the South Essex. He is one of the handful of officers who sides with Major Richard Sharpe. Trumper-Jones acts as Sharpe's legal representative when he is accused of murder.

=== Charlie Weller ===
Charlie Weller
- First appearance: Sharpe's Regiment (Novels) Sharpe's Regiment (Series)
- Last appearance: Sharpe's Assassin (Novels) Sharpe's Regiment (Series)
- Created by: Bernard Cornwell
- Portrayed by: Steve Chambers

In-universe information
- Title: Sergeant
- Occupation: Soldier
- Nationality: English

Sergeant Charlie Weller first appears in Sharpe's Regiment when he is recruited into the South Essex's second battalion by Sergeant Horatio Havercamp.

In the brutal conditions at the training camp under Col. Bartholomew Girdwood, however, he finds army life is not how expected it. He was the rarest of recruits, something respected by fellow undercover recruit, Richard Sharpe, a man who joined the army out of patriotism rather than desperation. Sharpe and Harper, disguised as fellow recruits, can see in Charlie the makings of a good soldier, and try their best to look out for him. Weller had been promised by Havercamp that his small terrier, Buttons, would be welcome at camp, but Girdwood, who hates and fears dogs, orders it killed, earning Weller's eternal enmity.

When Major Sharpe finally takes the new recruits and Col. Girdwood back with him to Spain to fill out the depleted ranks of the newly named Prince of Wales' Own Volunteers, he tells the men that they may all keep dogs as pets in the ranks, making it clear who actually is in command of the regiment.

Weller survives the remainder of the war, and appears in Sharpe's Waterloo, where he is asked by Private Clayton to watch out for his wife Sally, should he fall. When Clayton does indeed die in the final hour of the battle, Weller is as good as his word. After the battle Sharpe notices Weller and Sally together and tells the young man he can be a sergeant if only he'd fetch Sharpe a cup of tea.

After accompanying Sharpe on his mission to Paris in Sharpe's Assassin, Weller and Sally marry and take up employment on the Sharpe-Lassan farm in Normandy, where they are expecting their first child.

=== Brian Windham ===
Brian Windham
- First appearance: Sharpe's Company (Novels) Sharpe's Company (Series)
- Last appearance: Sharpe's Sword (Novels) Sharpe's Company (Series)
- Created by: Bernard Cornwell
- Portrayed by: Clive Francis

In-universe information
- Title: Colonel
- Occupation: British Officer
- Nationality: English

Colonel Brian Windham first appears in Sharpe's Company as the new commander of the South Essex, replacing the injured Colonel William Lawford. He is described as a bluff man, not unkind, with cropped grey hair. Sharpe thought his was a face one might expect to see sitting on the bench in a county court; a knowing face, experienced. He is obsessed with hunting and brought both hunters and hounds with him to Spain. He is utterly devoted to his wife Jessica, whose portrait shows a rather stern, somewhat chinless woman. Initially he wants a regular inspection of the wives attached to the South Essex, saying he wants no girls like the one he'd seen Sharpe arguing over. Sharpe, anticipating future events, named Teresa his wife. That the wedding had been private nearly 16 months previously, and that they had a seven month old daughter. He further informed the Colonel that his wife was employed outside the Regiment - as a partisan. Flustered, Windham apologized for mistaking Sharpe's wife. He then, however, fell back on accepted lore. That officers from the ranks never succeeded except in administration. Taking pains to ease Sharpe into the reality of his situation, he informs him that the captaincy he'd been hoping for had been purchased by another, and his gazette rank denied. He then sends Lieutenant Sharpe back to quartermaster duties, so that the new captain of the Light Company would not have to compete with Sharpe for the men. When Sharpe then immediately asks for the Forlorn Hope at Badajoz, Windham calls him unbalanced, that there will be vacancies a plenty after the attack. When his wife's portrait is stolen, the silver frame for it is found in Harper's kit. The furious Windham demands to know where the portrait was, but Harper, innocent of the crime, could not tell him. Windham, in his fury, breaks Harper back to private and sentences him to 100 lashes. After the intervention of Michael Hogan, Windham reduces the sentence to 60 lashes. After Badjoz, Sharpe returns Jessica Windham's portrait to him, and explains where it had been found. That Harper had been innocent. Windham, to his credit, offers Harper an apology. Harper brushed off the need by telling him a striped back was very attractive to the ladies. He returns the command of the Light Company to Sharpe after the death of the new captain.

In Sharpe's Sword, he was murdered by a Philippe Leroux, a man he thought was a paroled French officer, who then broke parole, killed his ensign and then the Colonel before escaping into the forts outside Salamanca.

== British ==
=== Ayres ===
Ayres
- First appearance: Sharpe's Gold (Novels) Sharpe's Gold (Series)
- Last appearance: Sharpe's Gold (Novels) Sharpe's Gold (Series)
- Portrayed by: Ian Shaw

In-universe information
- Title: Lieutenant
- Occupation: British Army Provost Officer
- Nationality: English

Lieutenant Ayers was a British Army provost officer, military police responsible for military discipline among British troops in Portugal and Spain.

He was one of three provosts on duty in a small deserted Portuguese village. Their equipment was new, and their faces burned red, indicating that they had newly arrived on the Peninsula. After some verbal sparring with Captain Sharpe, Lieutenant Ayes and the two other provosts went to examine Sharpe's men, and he caught Private Batten with a stolen chicken. Ayers determined that Private Batten must hang and only armed intervention by Sharpe and Harper stopped it happening (Sharpe's Gold).

Subsequently, Sharpe was forced to apologize to an embarrassed Lieutenant Ayers, in the company of the Provost Marshal and Colonel Williams. Sharpe's smart apology caused Ayers to agree to his own regret over the incident, to the confusion of Colonel Williams (Sharpe's Gold : Chapter 3). But the matter was dropped.

In the television movie of the same name, but of a wildly divergent plot, it was a private Skillicorn who had the chicken, and things played out exactly the same – save that Ayers re-arrested the rifleman after the incident was over, and apparently hanged him. He then accompanied Sharpe on a mission to trade rifles to the partisans for deserters in their camp. He was killed during a raid into the partisan's lair by a knife that was thrown at him.

=== Horace Bampfylde ===
Horace Bampfylde
- First appearance: Sharpe's Siege (Novels) Sharpe's Siege (Series)
- Last appearance: Sharpe's Revenge (Novels)
- Portrayed by: Christopher Villiers

In-universe information
- Title: Captain of HMS Vengeance (Novels) Expeditionary force commander (Series)
- Occupation: British Naval Officer (Novels) British Army officer (Series)
- Nationality: English

In the novel series, Horace Bampfylde is the captain of HMS Vengeance. Sharpe first meets him at the officers' club in St Jean de la Luz during the events of Sharpe's Siege. He is described as young, plump, and confident, but wisely backs down from confrontation with Sharpe. Afterwards, both Sharpe and Bampfylde become involved in an expedition into Bordeaux near the Bassin d'Arcachon. While Sharpe and his forces try to take the Teste de Buch fortress guarding the mouth of the Bassin d'Arcachon, Bampfylde is tasked with capturing three dozen chasee-marées to be used as a boat bridge for crossing the Adour River, and stirring up a monarchist rebellion. Upon arrival at the Teste de Buch, Bampfylde changes strategy, instead using the Royal Marines under his command to attack the fortress, while Sharpe's men ambush a military convoy on the south road. However, Bampfylde's attack on the fortress is countered by American auxiliaries led by Captain Cornelius Killick in a nearby wood, leading to numerous casualties. In the end, Sharpe's forces manage to take the fort via a ruse, while Captain Frederickson's 60th Rifles capture the Americans.

Bampfylde planned to have the Americans executed as pirates and Royal Navy deserters, ignoring Killick's letter of marque. Sharpe, however, releases the Americans under an oath of non-aggression, infuriating Bampfylde. Nonetheless, Bampfylde dictates a report for the Admiralty in London over-glorifying himself and ignoring the pivotal role played by Major Sharpe. He then sent Sharpe's men and Marine Captain Palmer's forces on reconnaissance further inland and track down Killick's Americans. While Sharpe and Palmer were out, Bampfylde arranged for the chasse-marées to sail for St Jean de la Luz. The loyalist Comte de Maquerre (secretly an agent of Major Pierre Ducos) met with Bampfylde during this time, and claimed Sharpe and the Royal Marines were defeated and captured in battle with a larger French brigade. With Sharpe's forces supposedly killed or captured, and a fierce storm on the way, Bampfylde abandoned the Teste de Buch with only his wounded men inside, bombarded it with his ships' cannon, and sailed back to St Jean de la Luz.

Some time later, Bampfylde was shocked to find that Sharpe was alive, well, and not captured. Sharpe reprimanded Bampfylde for his cowardice, and at the start of the next novel, Sharpe's Revenge, had already challenged Bampfylde to a duel. During the duel, Bampfylde fired first, but his bullet missed Sharpe. Sharpe aimed at Bampfylde to kill, but instead shot Bampfylde through the buttocks. Back in Portsmouth, a Royal Navy inquiry found Bampfylde derelict in his duties for abandoning the Teste de Buch and failing to return to check on the shore party. This led Bampfylde to leave the Royal Navy for good.

In the television series episode Sharpe's Siege, Horace Bampfylde is portrayed as a young colonel, the son of an old general, although he retains many of the qualities of his novel counterpart. General Wellington gives him command of the expeditionary force sent into Bordeaux to aid with a supposed monarchist uprising. Much like in the novel, Colonel Bampfylde's first attempts at scaling the Teste de Buch fail, Sharpe's men take the fortress, and Bampfylde later abandons the fortress after being fed false information about Major Sharpe's defeat from the Comte de Maquerre and Major Pierre Ducos (disguised as the mayor of a nearby community). While delivering his report to Wellington, Sharpe's men return to camp. Captain Palmer lists his grievances against Bampfylde in front of Wellington, assaults him, and Wellington orders Bampfyldes arrest for cowardice, desertion, and conspiracy with the enemy. He was played in the TV series by Christopher Villiers.

=== Joel Chase ===
Joel Chase
- First appearance: Sharpe's Trafalgar (Novels)
- Last appearance: Sharpe's Storm (Novels)

In-universe information
- Title: Captain of HMS Pucelle
- Occupation: British Naval Officer
- Nationality: English

Captain Joel Chase is the captain of HMS Pucelle. Sharpe first encounters Chase in Calcutta, shortly before he is due to sail back to England to join his new regiment. The captain informs Sharpe that he is thirty-five and later gives his birthday as 21 October, which places 1769 as the year of his birth. From Devon speaking in a Devonshire accent. Chase followed in his father's footsteps by joining the Royal Navy. Given that he is a post captain at the age of thirty-five, it may be surmised that he had a moderately successful career and probably entered the service as a young adolescent. He was a highly rated midshipman, and gained the necessary experience required for the lieutenant's examination. Chase's first command was apparently a twenty-eight-gun frigate by the name of HMS Spritely, in which he captured a French frigate. His ship, HMS Pucelle, a seventy-four-gun (third-rate) ship. Chase is married to a woman named Florence, has an unspecified number of children, and owns a small farm/estate somewhere in Devonshire. Chase is attached to the East Indian fleet, under the command of Sir Edward Pellew in Trafalgar but, having chased a French ship of the line halfway around the world in order to intercept a dangerous French politico, he finds himself under the command of Lord Nelson at Trafalgar. Needless to say, Sharpe too takes part in the battle, having been rescued by Chase after his ship was taken prize by the very third-rater that Chase was chasing. Captain Chase makes up part of the fleet that sails to Denmark, under Admiral Gambier, to help persuade the Danish to hand over their fleet for "protection" in 1807. While in Copenhagen he meets Sharpe again aiding him in his mission. Chase seems to represent the very best of the Royal Navy: he is good-natured, enthusiastic, seamanlike, possesses easy authority, and is readily accepting of Sharpe, despite Sharpe's humble origins. He is a devoted husband though he does have a weakness for gambling and has to pay off quite a large debt to Lord William Hale at the beginning of Trafalgar. He is clearly loved by his men, as attested to by one of his midshipmen, Harry Collier and his Bosun John Hopper. Chase is not a supporter of harsh discipline and dislikes flogging, though he does employ it when necessary and he is apt to reward his men generously, once giving oarsmen a double tot of rum after a stiff bout of towing in becalmed waters.

=== Harry Collier ===
Harry Collier
- First appearance: Sharpe's Trafalgar (Novels)
- Last appearance: Sharpe's Prey (Novels)

In-universe information
- Title: Midshipman
- Occupation: British Naval Officer
- Nationality: English

Midshipman Harry Collier served under Joel Chase who was captain of HMS Pucelle. He was very fond of Chase and also made a good impression on Sharpe. He was a young, enthusiastic and very able sailor.

=== William Dodd ===
William Dodd
- First appearance: Sharpe's Triumph (Novels) Sharpe's Challenge (Series)
- Last appearance: Sharpe's Fortress (Novels) Sharpe's Challenge (Series)
- Portrayed by: Toby Stephens

In-universe information
- Title: Major (highest rank achieved)
- Occupation: East India Company Officer
- Nationality: English

William Dodd appears in the novels set in India near the start of Sharpe's army career. Although he is based on a real historical figure, his involvement in the Sharpe novels is entirely fictional. Dodd appears in the 2006 television revival Sharpe's Challenge, portrayed by Toby Stephens. He also appears in the Simon Scarrow novel The Generals as the actual historical character.

The real William Dodd was a lieutenant in the East India Company. In 1803, he was responsible for beating a native worker to death and was fined by the company. Arthur Wellesley was outraged by the leniency of the sentence and demanded his dismissal, aiming to have him tried as a civilian for murder. Instead Dodd deserted to the Maratha army. Despite the offer of a seven hundred guinea reward for his capture, he was never seen again.

Cornwell uses this backstory, adding the desertion of Dodd's entire sepoy company. Dodd is charged by the mercenary commander of the Mahratta army, Anthony Pohlmann, with raiding the British fort at Chasalgoan, where he massacres the entire garrison, with the single exception of Richard Sharpe. He is rewarded with a promotion to major and command of a battalion, which he christens "Dodd's Cobras". Dodd escapes the British capture of Ahmednuggur. Shortly afterwards he encounters Sharpe with his mentor Colonel Hector McCandless and offers Sharpe a commission in his battalion. Sharpe is tempted to desert, but chooses instead to remain with McCandless when the Colonel is wounded during the theft of his horses by Dodd. Dodd survives Pohlmann's defeat at Assaye taking his Cobras with him.

In Sharpe's Fortress Dodd has allied with Manu Bappoo and has been promoted to colonel. Once again he survives defeat at the Battle of Argaum and withdraws to the mountain fortress of Gawilghur. There he makes plans to usurp power from his Indian employers. He welcomes Obadiah Hakeswill, an old antagonist of Sharpe's, when the former deserts, making him an officer in the Cobras. When the fortress is stormed by the British, Dodd betrays the Indian commander and locks the gates of the inner keep against both the retreating Indian defenders and the British assault force. Newly commissioned Ensign Sharpe leads a small force over the walls and traps Dodd on the ramparts. Dodd first kills Sharpe's young Arab servant, Ahmed, then almost defeats Sharpe in single combat, inflicting the facial scar which becomes Sharpe's most noted feature in later novels. He is only defeated and killed after the intervention of Sharpe's companion Sergeant Lockhart.

The Dodd of the television series is a British deserter but makes no reference to the real Dodd's back story. The film begins with the massacre at Chasalgaon in 1803 before skipping forward to the post-Waterloo period, circa 1817. By now, Dodd is the effective ruler of the region, being the lover of the regent Madhuvanthi. Dodd meets Sharpe and Patrick Harper when they arrive at his fort posing as deserters and offers them places in his army until he learns their true allegiance. He has arranged a mine to take care of the attacking British force but Sharpe and Harper manage to escape during the attack and set off the mine prematurely. Seeing his cause lost, Dodd kills Madhuvanthi and attempts to flee with the royal treasury but is confronted by Sharpe. A sword fight between the two men sees Dodd disarmed after which Sharpe forces him to sit on the throne he had coveted and skewering him through the chest with his sword, pinning him to it.

=== Simon Doggett ===
Simon Doggett
- First appearance: Sharpe's Waterloo (Novels)
- Last appearance: Sharpe's Waterloo (Novels)
- Created by: Bernard Cornwell

In-universe information
- Title: Captain
- Occupation: Officer
- Nationality: English

Simon Doggett first appeared in Sharpe's Waterloo. As a lieutenant he was an aide attached to the Prince of Orange, but couldn't abide the Prince's incompetence. During the Battle of Waterloo he publicly insults the Prince and calls him a murderer for repeatedly ordering battalions facing cavalry to form line rather than square, calling him a "silk stocking full of shit". After his tirade, he joins Sharpe with the Prince of Wales' own Volunteers. After the Battle of Waterloo, Sharpe promotes him to captain in the Prince of Wales' own Volunteers, as nearly all the officers in the battalion were killed.

=== Thomas Garrard ===
Thomas Garrard
- First appearance: Sharpe's Tiger (Novels)
- Last appearance: Sharpe's Battle (Novels)
- Created by: Bernard Cornwell

In-universe information
- Title: Captain
- Occupation: Soldier
- Nationality: English

Thomas Garrard (Tom Garrard) first appeared in Sharpe's Tiger, where he is a private soldier in the 33rd, and a friend of Sharpe's. He returns during the Peninsular War, having accepted a commission in the Portuguese army who looked for experienced British soldiers for their junior officers. He survives Sharpes' blowing up the gunpowder storage in Burgos cathedral and surrenders to the French. Later joins a Portuguese Caçadore regiment and bravely thwart an attack by Brigadier Loup, by blowing up an ammunition wagon, unfortunately killing himself in the action, saving Sharpe and his men.

=== Jane Gibbons ===
Jane Gibbons
- First appearance: Sharpe's Eagle (Novels) Sharpe's Regiment (Series)
- Last appearance: Sharpe's Waterloo (Novels) Sharpe's Waterloo (Series)
- Created by: Bernard Cornwell
- Portrayed by: Abigail Cruttenden

In-universe information
- Family: Christian Gibbons (brother, deceased), Henry Simmerson (uncle)
- Spouse: Richard Sharpe (separated)
- Nationality: English

Jane Gibbons (later Sharpe) is the second wife of Richard Sharpe. She is first mentioned in the very first Sharpe novel, Sharpe's Eagle, in which Sharpe encounters her sadistic brother Christian. After Gibbons' death (at the hands of Sharpe's friend Patrick Harper), Sharpe finds he is wearing a locket containing a miniature of Jane, signed "God keep you. Love, Jane" and wonders if she knows what her brother was like. (Sharpe would wear the locket himself for some time afterwards before losing it while he was a prisoner of Ducos in Sharpe's Honour.)

At some point in between Sharpe's Gold and Sharpe's Company, Sharpe and Harper met Jane off-page during a visit to England. She makes her full debut in the series in Sharpe's Regiment where Sharpe and Harper encounter her again while back in England investigating the apparent disappearance of the South Essex Regiment's Second Battalion. The battalion is being used for illegal soldier auctions by Jane's uncle Henry Simmerson, an old enemy of Sharpe's. Jane herself is eking out a miserable existence in Simmerson's country house, unwillingly engaged to the battalion's arrogant and incompetent commander Bartholomew Girdwood. She explains to Sharpe that her parents died when she was thirteen and she went to live with Simmerson and his wife, her mother's sister. Since her father was a commoner, Simmerson considers her an embarrassment and keeps her away from high society. After Sharpe puts an end to the auctions, he takes Jane back to Spain with them where they marry.

Jane plays only a small role in the following novel, Sharpe's Siege in which Sharpe is alarmed to discover she has been visiting his friend Lieutenant-Colonel Michael Hogan, who is sick with fever and fears she has been infected. When he returns from the mission that is the main focus of the book, he finds he was mistaken, and only had a cold.

The following book, Sharpe's Revenge, sees a major change in Jane's character. With the Peninsular War nearing an end, Sharpe sends Jane back to England to procure a house in the country. Disliking the idea, she instead buys an expensive and gaudy London town house and is seduced by the wealth of high society previously denied her. She also becomes disillusioned with Sharpe's lack of ambition for peacetime and prestige (promotions, living in London, knighthood). When she hears Sharpe has been arrested on suspicion of theft, she initially tries to help him but when it appears he has murdered Commandant Lassan, a man who might have given evidence against him, she sees it as license to begin an affair with Lord John Rossendale. The affair is discovered by Harper and Peter D'Alembord when they come to Jane with a message from Sharpe, during which Jane gleefully watches as Rossendale horsewhips Harper. When Sharpe's name is cleared, Jane and Rossendale are fearful he will come looking for him, not least because Jane has withdrawn a large sum of money from his account.

Jane accompanies Rossendale to Belgium in Sharpe's Waterloo but finds herself shunned by society since she is only Rossendale's mistress. She attends the Duchess of Richmond's ball with him where they have a violent encounter with Sharpe. She then encourages Rossendale to kill Sharpe using the confusion of battle so that they may marry. She has not told anyone that she is pregnant with Rossendale's child, an idea that appalls her. At the end of the book, she is left to await the news of Rossendale's death at Waterloo.

The fate of Jane and her child is unknown, although she is referred to as still being alive at the time of Sharpe's Devil. In his book The Sharpe Companion, Mark Adkin claims Jane died in 1844, presumably of natural causes, but this has not been confirmed in any novel.

In the Sharpe's television series, Jane is played by Abigail Cruttenden (then wife of Sean Bean). Her character arc stays very close to that of the novels. She and Sharpe are familiar with each other in Sharpe's Regiment but she has not been mentioned previously and how they met before is never stated: although her brother appeared in the television version of Sharpe's Eagle he is not mentioned there and indeed their relationship is never explicitly confirmed (although it can be inferred from their shared surname and uncle in Simmerson). In Sharpe's Siege, Jane does contract fever, rather than Sharpe merely fearing she has and is already ill when he leaves (here she visits Major-General Ross rather than Hogan, who had already left the series). When he returns he finds she has recovered thanks to Wellington acquiring some quinine from the Spanish. In this episode she is also seen working as an assistant to the regimental surgeon, Kenefick and her wedding to Sharpe, unlike in the books, occurs onscreen towards the beginning. In Sharpe's Revenge, Jane's betrayal of Sharpe is partly motivated by his breaking a promise to not fight again after Toulouse when he challenges Colonel Wigram to a duel after the Colonel insulted Jane.

In addition to the television adaptations of the four novels she appeared in, Jane is present in two stories unique to the television series. In Sharpe's Mission, set after Sharpe's Siege, she is shown to already be disenchanted with the soldier's life that seems destined to always be Sharpe's lot and is easily seduced by the arrival of the superficially cultured poet Shellington. She appears to contemplate an affair with him in Sharpe's absence but sees through him when Harris reveals that the poem he has supposedly written about her is plagiarised and reconciles with Sharpe at the end. In Sharpe's Justice, Jane accompanies Rossendale to a property left for him by a recently deceased aunt and in doing so encounters Sharpe, who is in the area commanding the Scarsdale Yeomanry (ironically, a position assigned to him by Rossendale's connivance in order to keep him away from London). Jane and Rossendale seem eager to take advantage of Sir Willoughby Parfitt's schemes to bankrupt and buy out mills but fail when Sharpe exposes his methods. Afterwards, Jane tells Sharpe that Rossendale will obtain him release from his post in exchange for him leaving them alone.

In Sharpe's Waterloo, as in the novel, Jane travels to Belgium with John. She is shunned for being the wife of another man and when Sharpe turns up, he disgraces her at a ball, calling her a whore. Jane convinces John to kill Sharpe at Waterloo but he is killed before he can do so.

=== Michael Hogan ===
Michael Hogan
- First appearance: Sharpe's Rifles (Novels) Sharpe's Rifles (Series)
- Last appearance: Sharpe's Siege (Novels) Sharpe's Eagle (Series)
- Created by: Bernard Cornwell
- Portrayed by: Brian Cox

In-universe information
- Title(s): Captain (to 1809); Major (1809-c 1814); Lieutenant Colonel (1814)
- Occupation: British Army Officer
- Religion: Catholic
- Nationality: Irish

Michael Hogan is a fictional character in the Sharpe series of novels by Bernard Cornwell, loosely based on the career of the historical Colquhoun Grant.

Hogan is a Royal Engineers officer — while the Purchase System still allowed many British infantry and cavalry officers to buy commissions in the early 19th century, all other British military branches, including the engineers, the Royal Navy and the Royal Artillery, promoted by seniority or merit. Unfortunately, this meant promotion was rather slow and Hogan is still a captain in 1808, despite his long service and abilities.

Born in Ireland of presumed Catholic ancestry, his life before he encounters Sharpe is rather unclear. It is implied that he has spent time in India and Gibraltar, before joining the British garrison in Lisbon in 1808 following the British capture of the Portuguese capital after the Battle of Vimeiro. He is employed by Arthur Wellesley in mapping the Portuguese border and it is here that he first meets Lieutenant Richard Sharpe, who is to become his friend and colleague (Sharpe's Rifles).

Hogan is promoted to major in 1809, and thereafter appears to head the British intelligence network in the Iberian Peninsula. This was at a time when there was no formal military intelligence unit and Hogan's role is a good illustration of the sort of ad hoc arrangements used by the British in the field in the eighteenth and nineteenth centuries.

Sharpe is frequently employed (with or without his men) to carry out small scale secret operations for Hogan – for example, destroying a bridge in Sharpe's Eagle, capturing a renegade exploring officer in Sharpe's Havoc, retrieving treasure vital to the war effort in Sharpe's Gold, retrieving hostages in Sharpe's Enemy and uncovering or capturing French spies in Sharpe's Battle, Sharpe's Sword and Sharpe's Siege.

Although Hogan's role as spymaster requires him to be at times both ruthless and duplicitous, he is a good friend to Sharpe throughout the series, often protecting him from official censure and advancing his career.

In 1814, in the last months of the war, Lieutenant Colonel Hogan is fatally stricken by fever. Even in his final delirium he is able to warn Sharpe of the presence of a double agent and so foil plans by his French counterpart, Pierre Ducos, to lure Sharpe into a trap. Thus he fulfils his obligations as a friend and officer to the very end.

Hogan is addicted to snuff taking.

Hogan is clearly proud of his Irish heritage and for many years carried around a small box of earth around with him, so that if he died he could be buried in 'Irish soil' (Sharpe's Battle).

However, unlike Sergeant Patrick Harper, Hogan does not wear his pride on his sleeve, nor does he demonstrate any anti-English sentiment. In the same novel he exhibits no qualms about arranging the assassination of Father Sarsfield, a nationalist Irish priest, who has been working as a French agent.

Hogan was portrayed in the TV adaptations by Scottish actor Brian Cox. However, due to scheduling conflicts, Cox was unable to reprise the role after the first two films and Hogan's character was subsequently merged with other exploring officers from the novels, particularly Major-General Nairn (Michael Byrne), Mungo Monroe (Hugh Ross) and Major-General Ross (James Laurenson).

=== John Hopper ===
John Hopper
- First appearance: Sharpe's Trafalgar (Novels)
- Last appearance: Sharpe's Prey (Novels)

In-universe information
- Title: Bosun
- Occupation: Sailor
- Nationality: English

John Hopper first appeared in Sharpe's Trafalgar serving under Captain Chase to whom he is very loyal. Hopper is a very able sailor which is noted in his rank of Bosun. He is a big strong fighter who is noted for his tattoos.

=== Kelly ===
Kelly
- First appearance: Sharpe's Enemy (Series)
- Last appearance: Sharpe's Enemy (Series)
- Created by: Bernard Cornwell
- Portrayed by: Morgan Jones

In-universe information
- Title: Chosen Man
- Occupation: Soldier, Deserter
- Nationality: English

Private Kelly only appears in the television series. A deserter under the command of Hakeswill. Kelly was a former Connaught Ranger who was wrongfully flogged and chose to desert as a consequence. Sharpe recognised Kelly from the battle of Talavera where he saw Sharpe take the Eagle. Sharpe recalls Kelly's bravery and fighting ability and asks Kelly to join him and fall in with the rest of the Chosen Men to which Kelly has no hesitation. Kelly helps Sharpe and the Chosen Men fight against the band of deserters. At the end of the battle Kelly is mortally wounded by a bayonet. Before Kelly dies of his injury, Sharpe makes Kelly a Chosen Man.

=== Hector McCandless ===
Hector McCandless
- First appearance: Sharpe's Tiger (Novels)
- Last appearance: Sharpe's Triumph (Novels)
- Created by: Bernard Cornwell

In-universe information
- Title: Colonel
- Occupation: British Army Officer
- Nationality: Scottish

Colonel Hector McCandless first appears in the novel Sharpe's Tiger by Bernard Cornwell. An aging, religious Calvinist who served with the King's Scotch Brigade, McCandless had to accept a job in the East India Company due to lack of funds for his promotion. After commanding battalions of Sepoys he was transferred by the company to the British Army to be promoted to colonel and chief of intelligence. A born surveyor McCandless is more familiar to India then most going on many mapping expeditions.

Speaking many native Indian languages he has connections with many across subcontinent including Appah Rao, a Hindu and former Sepoy of his who is currently a general in the Tippoo of Mysore's army.

Prior to the Siege of Seringapatam McCandless meets with Appah Rao behind enemy lines and learns of the Tippoo's plan to plant explosives in the space between the city's weak outer western wall and the newly built inner wall. Whilst carrying this vital information McCandless is intercepted and captured by the Tippoo's cavalry and taken to Seringapatam to be put before the Tippoo himself. Claiming to be the fictitious Colonel Ross he hides his true mission by pretending he was out foraging. The Tippoo believes him and has McCandless thrown in the palace dungeon.

After General Harris and General Baird send Private Sharpe and Lieutenant William Lawford to rescue McCandless and his information He is almost shot by Sharpe as the Tippoo tells Sharpe to kill McCandless to prove his loyalty. Sharpe fires but McCandless survives due to the Tippoo's use of fake gunpowder.

After Sharpe and Lawford are exposed as spies they meet McCandless in the dungeon where McCandless helps teach Sharpe to read. McCandless later escapes with Lawford and Sharpe with the help of Sharpe's lover Mary Bickerstaff as the British attack Seringapatam.

=== Charles Morris ===
Charles Morris
- First appearance: Sharpe's Tiger (Novels)
- Last appearance: Sharpe's Assassin (Novels)
- Created by: Bernard Cornwell

In-universe information
- Title: Major
- Occupation: British Army Officer
- Nationality: English

Major Charles Morris is a fictional character in the Richard Sharpe novels by Bernard Cornwell and a significant antagonist in the hero's early career.

Morris is a lazy, venal and corrupt Captain in the 33rd Regiment of Foot's Light Company, replacing the more energetic and decent Captain Hughes after the latter's death from "the flux". He relies on the brutal Sergeant Obidiah Hakeswill to run the company and is easily drawn into peculation and other abuses of authority.

On the eve of the regiment's deployment against the Tipoo Sultan in 1799, Morris conspires with Hakeswill to frame private Richard Sharpe for assault, leading to a sentence of 2,000 lashes, a prolonged and agonising death sentence. Only the reluctant intervention of the regiment's commander, Lieutenant Colonel Arthur Wellesley, prevents the flogging being carried beyond the 200th stroke (Sharpe's Tiger).

Four years later Hakeswill is able to manipulate Morris into laying a further charge of assault against Sharpe, by knocking the captain unconscious himself and dousing the officer with the contents of a full chamber pot (Sharpe's Triumph). This plot is foiled when Sharpe is given a battlefield commission as ensign, after the Battle of Assaye and placed out of Hakeswill's power.

Morris makes one final appearance during the assault on the fortress at Gawilghur, when he refuses to lead a detachment of troops over the wall; Sharpe knocks him unconscious, leads the assault and so takes the fortress (Sharpe's Fortress).

Little is known of Morris's subsequent career, until 1812, when Hakeswill joins the South Essex Regiment and informs Sharpe that Morris is part of the garrison of Dublin Castle in Ireland (Sharpe's Company).

Morris, now a major, is drafted into the South Essex after the Battle of Waterloo to replace the experienced officers lost in the battle, and tries to impose discipline. Sharpe vows to personally flog Morris if any of the men are flogged, making him get nervous around him, and in the final battle of the war Morris is arrested for displaying cowardice in the face of the enemy, refusing to take a wounded Sharpe's place in a fight, ultimately resigning his commission in disgrace rather than face a court martial (Sharpe's Assassin).

=== Nairn ===
Nairn
- First appearance: Sharpe's Enemy (Novels) Sharpe's Company (Series)
- Last appearance: Sharpe's Revenge (Novels) Sharpe's Honour (Series)
- Created by: Bernard Cornwell
- Portrayed by: Michael Byrne

In-universe information
- Occupation: Soldier (Major General)
- Nationality: Scottish

Major-General Nairn (first name unknown) is a fictional character in the Sharpe series of novels written by Bernard Cornwell. He was a regular on the second series of the Sharpe television programme, in which he was played by Michael Byrne.

Nairn first appears in Sharpe's Company, where he orchestrates the assault on the fortress of Ciudad Rodrigo.

He makes his first major appearance in Sharpe's Enemy, where he is in command of the British forces in Frenada whilst Wellington is in Lisbon. He informs Sharpe that he has been promoted to major on the order of the Prince Regent and assigns him the job of rescuing Lady Farthingdale (in reality Sharpe's old flame Josefina) from a deserters' enclave at Adrados. At the climax of the novel, it is Nairn who leads the British force that comes to Sharpe's aid when he is facing a French attack at Adrados.

Nairn has something of a friendship with Sharpe and meets with him again in Sharpe's Regiment to inform him that a request for reinforcements has been refused and the South Essex Regiment is in danger of being disbanded. He therefore gives Sharpe permission to take a party of four back to England to try to find reinforcements. He later greets Sharpe on his return to Spain and observes his harsh treatment of the corrupt Lieutenant-Colonel Girdwood. He gives his tacit approval of the behaviour but also warns Sharpe that he will arrange for Girdwood's replacement to be a hard taskmaster.

By the time of Sharpe's Revenge in 1814, Nairn has finally been given command of a brigade after years as a staff officer, consisting of two English Battalions and one Highlander battalion. He has Sharpe assigned to him as his chief of staff and also makes Harper, Frederickson and Frederickson's company part of his command. He is finally given a chance to lead his men into battle at Toulouse, where he is injured by a canister shot. He claims he has only been hit in the leg and instructs Sharpe to lead the brigade forward. When Sharpe sees a stretcher being carried near him, he learns that he died from his wounds – the canister had also pierced his lung.

Nairn appears in all three episodes of Sharpe's second series, comprising Sharpe's Enemy and adaptations of Sharpe's Company and Sharpe's Honour. His character is recreated as a major (rather than a major general), who effectively fulfills the same duties as Hogan in the novels – the chief of Wellington's espionage operations.

Nairn is first seen in Sharpe's Company, where he approaches Sharpe in the aftermath of the attack on Ciudad Rodrigo to discuss the wounding of Sharpe's commanding officer Colonel Lawford during the attack. Like Hogan, this Nairn is a major in the Royal Engineers and Sharpe criticises their performance during the attack. He is also a spymaster, as Sharpe learns when Nairn sends Teresa into Badajoz. Like many of the spymasters in the series, Nairn has a somewhat uneasy relationship with Sharpe, who sees him as placing Teresa in needless danger. He is at Wellington's side during the subsequent attack on Badajoz.

In Sharpe's Enemy, Nairn's role is slightly expanded from in the novel. He realises the French have an interest in Adrados when he learns of the presence of Pierre Ducos, his opposite number. Along with Teresa, he spies on the French positions and, after Teresa is shot by Hakeswill, he takes her dying body to Sharpe. He is present in the courtyard when Ducos attempts to force Sharpe to surrender.

In his last episode, Sharpe's Honour, Nairn worries about Sharpe's malaise in the aftermath of Teresa's death. It is Nairn who breaks up Sharpe's illegal duel with El Marques de Casares el Grande y Melida Sadaba and who arranges to have Sharpe's execution faked after he is accused of killing El Marques. He then despatches Sharpe and Harper to search for El Marques' widow, Helene and later gives permission for Harper to take the rest of the Chosen Men to rescue Sharpe after he is captured by Ducos. He is last seen, alongside Wellington as ever, watching the victory celebrations after the Battle of Vitoria. As with Hogan, his absence from subsequent series is not explained.

=== Septimus Pyecroft ===
Septimus Pyecroft
- First appearance: Sharpe's Mission (Series)
- Last appearance: Sharpe's Mission (Series)
- Portrayed by: Nigel Betts

In-universe information
- Title: Major
- Occupation: British Exploring Officer, Demolition Specialist
- Nationality: British

Major Septimus Pyecroft specialises in demolitions and appears only in Sharpe's Mission. He was badly burned in a munitions accident, and wears a leather hood to conceal his scars.

=== Lord John Rossendale ===
John Rossendale
- First appearance: Sharpe's Regiment (Novels) Sharpe's Regiment (Series)
- Last appearance: Sharpe's Waterloo (Novels) Sharpe's Waterloo (Series)
- Created by: Bernard Cornwell
- Portrayed by: Alexander Armstrong, Alexis Denisof

In-universe information
- Title(s): Lord, Captain, Colonel (military rank)
- Occupation: British Cavalry Officer
- Nationality: British

Lord John Rossendale first crosses Richard Sharpe's path in 1813 in Sharpe's Regiment as a courtier to the Prince Regent in London. Rossendale is initially an ally in Major Sharpe's attempts to find missing recruits to the South Essex Regiment, providing support and guidance through the social pitfalls of court circles.

However, a year later, in Sharpe's Revenge, as a Colonel, Rossendale takes advantage of Sharpe's arrest for theft to embark on an affair with his wife, Jane, while also laying waste to Sharpe's considerable fortune.

In June 1815, at the outset of Napoleon's Hundred Days campaign, Rossendale satisfies his desire to see active service by joining the heavy cavalry appropriately enough under Henry Paget, Lord Uxbridge, who had conducted a similarly adulterous affair with the wife of Wellington's younger brother, Henry. He is accompanied by Jane, who is snubbed by society for her affair and who suspects she may be pregnant with Rossendale's bastard child (Sharpe's Waterloo).

Unfortunately, Sharpe, now a lieutenant colonel, is also serving with the Allied army, as staff officer to the Dutch Prince of Orange. Jane attempts to persuade Rossendale to murder Sharpe during the chaos of the imminent battle. When he suggests the French may kill Sharpe for them, she replies "They’ve had plenty of chances before and achieved nothing". Later that evening Sharpe and Rossendale clash at the Duchess of Richmond's ball in Brussels, where Sharpe humiliates his rival.

At the battle of Quatre Bras the next day, Sharpe corners Rossendale, destroys his pistol and sword and extracts a note of hand for the stolen money. Ashamed of his dishonourable conduct, Rossendale determines to prove himself during the forthcoming battle at Waterloo.

On the afternoon of the battle, the British Heavy Brigade, Rossendale in its midst, charges to complete the rout of a French infantry attack by the Comte d'Erlon at La Haye Sainte. Rossendale fights well, but the charge ends in disaster when the enthusiasm of the British cavalrymen leads them to gallop unsupported towards the French guns. Caught by French light cavalry, the British take appalling casualties.

Rossendale is pursued by a group of French lancers and hussars, blinded, stabbed and left for dead. He lies helpless on the field until his throat is cut by a Belgian peasant woman looting the wounded in the aftermath of the Allied victory. His death renders the note of hand given to Sharpe worthless, as he dies bankrupt and his estate has no legal call on the money stolen by Jane.

In the Carlton UK TV adaptation, Rossendale was portrayed by Alexander Armstrong in Sharpe's Regiment and by Alexis Denisof in Sharpe's Revenge, Sharpe's Justice and Sharpe's Waterloo.

=== Lord Wellington ===
Sir Arthur Wellesley
- First appearance: Sharpe's Tiger (Novels) Sharpe's Rifles (Series)
- Last appearance: Sharpe's Waterloo (Novels) Sharpe's Challenge (Series)
- Portrayed by: David Troughton, Hugh Fraser

In-universe information
- Nickname: Nosey
- Title(s): General, later Field Marshal
- Occupation: Commander of the British and Portuguese forces in Spain
- Nationality: British

Arthur Wellesley, 1st Duke of Wellington was an Anglo-Irish soldier and statesman who was one of the leading military and political figures of 19th-century Britain, serving twice as Prime Minister. His victory against Napoleon at the Battle of Waterloo in 1815 puts him in the first rank of Britain's military heroes.

He worked his way through a series of promotions, but as an aristocrat, started as an officer rather than in the ranks. He did, however, earn no end of contempt from his peers. His career was only possible because of his aristocratic origins and connections. Nobody not born into the gentry could ever hope to attain commands such as those Wellington was given, and the only thing that truly distinguished him from other noblemen given command as a favor rather than on merit, was that he proved to have actual talent when it came to command, as did Sharpe. Because of a prominent nose, he was often called Nosey behind his back.

Wellington features throughout the Bernard Cornwell Sharpe novels and in the television series directed by Tom Clegg. He is portrayed by David Troughton in Sharpe's Rifles and Sharpe's Eagle, and by Hugh Fraser in all appearances afterward.

== French ==
=== Napoleon Bonaparte ===
Napoleon Bonaparte
- First appearance: Sharpe's Waterloo (Novels) Sharpe's Honour (Series)
- Last appearance: Sharpe's Devil (Novels) Sharpe's Waterloo (Series)

In-universe information
- Nickname: Boney
- Title: Commander of France's armed Forces
- Occupation: Emperor of France
- Nationality: French

Napoleon Bonaparte was the emperor of France from 1799 through 1814. Under his reign, Europe was plunged into war as he attempted a campaign of conquest that was remarkably successful.

In the world of the Sharpe Napoleon Bonaparte is often referred to, usually as Boney, a soldiers nickname for him, but is not seen. He is only depicted in the TV series twice; Once where he sits at a campfire and discusses Ducos' plan to have Spain exit the war which coincided with Ducos' desire for revenge against Sharpe, and again where he was glimpsed by the characters of Sharpe in the television series during the wars, briefly and through the smoke of battle at Waterloo.

He only appeared in the novels in any noticeable way in Sharpe's Devil, when Sharpe and Harper stopped at the island of St. Helena to visit the exiled dictator.

=== Jean-Baptiste Calvet ===
Jean-Baptiste Calvet
- First appearance: Sharpe's Siege (Novels) Sharpe's Mission (Series)
- Last appearance: Sharpe's Revenge (Novels) Sharpe's Revenge (Series)
- Portrayed by: Olivier Pierre, John Benfield

In-universe information
- Title: General
- Occupation: Soldier Brigadier General
- Nationality: French

Jean-Baptiste Calvet is described as squat and having a broad, scarred face, burned with gunpowder stains. He was a brutal and effective soldier. The son of a ditch digger, he rose through the ranks in the post-revolution army, to become a "General of Brigade", and one of Napoleon's most dedicated adherents, having served against the Austrians, and then in Russia, surviving with his brigade intact. His demi-brigade of 2000 men was fought to a standstill by Richard Sharpe and his handful of men during the siege at Teste de Buch in Sharpe's Siege, after Sharpe used such desperate measures as dropping lime on to the attacking forces to blind them.

They encounter each other again in Sharpe's Revenge while leading a counter attack during the Toulouse, during which, Sharpe gets near him as he retreats with an Imperial Eagle. He is then sent by Napoleon to find his missing baggage and treasury, with a dozen soldiers. When they met again in the Kingdom of Naples, he slapped Sharpe's face for the use of the lime. The two then joined forces to retrieve the Imperial treasury, stolen by Pierre Ducos, from a Neapolitan villa. He then returned the stolen treasure to Napoleon on Elba and remained with him in exile.

By 1820, after Napoleon's defeat and final exile, Calvet was reported as living in Louisiana in the United States rather than remain in France under a Bourbon king.

In the television series, General Calvet's name was changed to Maurice Calvet. Two separate actors played him: Olivier Pierre in Sharpe's Mission and Sharpe's Siege, and John Benfield in Sharpe's Revenge.

=== Lucille Castineau ===
Lucille Castineau, nee Lassan (novels), Lucille Castineau, nee Maillot (TV)
- First appearance: Sharpe's Revenge (Novels) Sharpe's Revenge (Series)
- Last appearance: Sharpe's Devil (Novels) Sharpe's Waterloo (Series)
- Created by: Bernard Cornwell
- Portrayed by: Cécile Paoli

In-universe information
- Title: Madame la Vicomtesse de Seleglise
- Occupation: Farmer
- Family: Comte de Lassan (father), Henri Lassan (brother)
- Spouses: Xavier Castineau (deceased), Richard Sharpe
- Children: Patrick-Henri Lassan, Dominique Lassan
- Nationality: French

Lucille Castineau was Richard Sharpe's third (common-law) wife. She was aged twenty-seven in June 1815, placing 1788 as her birth date. She was born to the Lassan family of Normandy. Her father was the Comte de Lassan, a minor aristocrat in possession of a large estate house and farm fallen on hard times. Lucille herself bore the title of Vicomtesse. Her father was killed during the Revolution and was succeeded in his title by her older brother Henri Lassan. Her brother soon renounced his title in the face of further persecutions and later joined Napoleon's army as an officer. This left Lucille and her mother, the Dowager Countess, to run the estate.

During the Napoleonic wars, Lucille married the son of a French general, a cavalry officer named Xavier Castineau. However, he soon after died in Russia, forcing Lucille to move back into the Lassan home. After Napoleon's defeat by the British, Henri also returned home and made arrangements to marry. Unfortunately, both Henri and her mother were murdered soon afterwards by thugs of French spymaster Pierre Ducos, trying to prevent Lassan from revealing Ducos's own treachery to Richard Sharpe. Lucille was left alone on the farm.

When Sharpe afterwards came to seek out her brother, Lucille mistakenly shot him with a large blunderbuss, wounding Sharpe. Realising her mistake, she took him and his friend William Frederickson in for several months. While Sharpe recuperated, Frederickson became interested in Lucille, but when he proposed, she turned him down. Frederickson left to pursue their original investigation and Sharpe took a hand in helping Lucille on the farm. During this solitude, Sharpe learned to speak French and the two became lovers (leading to Sharpe's permanent estrangement from Frederickson).

After travelling to Italy to defeat Ducos, Sharpe returned to the Lassan estate permanently. Lucille bore Sharpe a son, Patrick-Henri (named for her brother and for Sharpe's friend, Patrick Harper), who was still an infant at the time of the Waterloo Campaign. In 1819, Sharpe was still living on the farm with Lucille, who had born him a second child, a daughter named Dominique. Both children carried the Lassan name. According to Henri-Patrick, Sharpe and Lucille never married formally. Probably this was because Sharpe's English wife, Jane Gibbons, did not predecease him and he could not afford a legal divorce. Later in 1861, Patrick-Henri Lassan, by then a lieutenant-colonel in the French Cavalry and liaison to the Union Army during the US Civil War in Cornwell's Starbuck Chronicles reported that Lucille was still alive and well but lonely – implying that by this time Sharpe is dead.

In the Carlton UK TV series, Lucille was portrayed by Cécile Paoli. Since her brother's original actor was unable for the adaptation of Sharpe's Revenge, her maiden name was changed to Maillot. Furthermore, her husband was changed from Xavier Castineau to Xavier DuBert. However, in the original episode Sharpe's Challenge, the series departed from the novels' continuity and reported that she had died of fever around 1817.

=== Pot-au-Feu ===
Sergeant Deron
- First appearance: Sharpe's Havoc (Novels) Sharpe's Enemy (Series)
- Last appearance: Sharpe's Enemy
- Created by: Bernard Cornwell
- Portrayed by: Tony Haygarth

In-universe information
- Title(s): Sergeant, Marshal (Deserter)
- Occupation: Soldier, chef, deserter
- Nationality: French

Sergeant Deron, later known as Marshal Pot-au-Feu was a French soldier and later leader of deserted French, British, Spanish and Portuguese soldiers along the Spanish-Portuguese frontier. Based on a real-life individual, Pot-au-Feu is described is short and immensely fat, with white curly hair.

In Sharpe's Havoc, Sergeant Deron serves as head chef to Marshal Jean-de-Dieu Soult. During the Second Battle of Porto, Marshal Soult and Sergeant Deron share an argument over the night's supper menu, only for the eventual menu to be served to General Sir Arthur Wellesley at the end of the battle. Afterwards, Deron deserted from the French army and started his own army of deserting soldiers, with himself in command as Marshal Pot-au-Feu. He would also form an alliance with the deserting British sergeant Obadiah Hakeswill, now Colonel of a group of British deserters. During 'Sharpe's Enemy, set during Christmas 1812, Pot-au-Feu's army camps out on the Galician hill-town of Adrados, slaughtering its inhabitants and taking captive two women: Lady Farthingdale (Josefina LaCosta) and Madame Dubreton (the English wife of French Colonel Michel Dubreton). Major Richard Sharpe and Colonel Dubreton parlay with Pot-au-Feu and Hakeswill to pay ransom and arrange the captives' release, but Pot-au-Feu and Hakeswill only prescribe further ransom payments to ensure the women's virtue. On Christmas Eve, the deserters celebrate and get drunk, only to wake up Christmas morning to Major Sharpe, the South Essex, the 113th Welsh Fusiliers and the 60th Royal Americans taking command of their mountain fortress. Pot-au-Feu was found cowering under a tarpaulin in the fortress stables. The British force took him prisoner and handed him over to the French under Colonel Dubreton, who forces the renegade to cook Christmas dinner for the British and French officers taking charge of the deserters. After Christmas dinner, he returned to Spain with the French forces, and was most likely executed.

In the TV-series adaptation of Sharpe's Enemy, Pot-au-Feu is portrayed by English actor Tony Haygarth. The portions of him cooking Christmas dinner are left out of the adaptation, instead showing him taken prisoner by French General Chaumier.

=== Pierre Ducos ===
Pierre Ducos
- First appearance: Sharpe's Battle (Novels) Sharpe's Enemy (Series)
- Last appearance: Sharpe's Revenge (Novels) Sharpe's Revenge (Series)
- Created by: Bernard Cornwell
- Portrayed by: Féodor Atkine

In-universe information
- Title: Major
- Occupation: Spy
- Nationality: French

Pierre Ducos [pjɛʁ dyko] is a French secret agent and alongside Obadiah Hakeswill is Sharpe's most bitter and persistent enemy through the later novels.

Ducos' exact origins are unclear. It appears he was born in France sometime in the 1770s, of fairly humble background. How he became involved in the world of espionage is not revealed, though he is described as a zealous revolutionary, and his rise occurred during the French Revolution of 1789 and the Terror that followed it. He was a protégé of Joseph Fouché, the notorious secret policeman of the revolutionary period. Following this he came into the service of the young General Napoleon Bonaparte, who was to crown himself Emperor of the French in 1804.

Until he first met Sharpe his schemes were largely successful and he is well regarded by his Imperial Master who entrusted him with matters of great importance, posting him to Spain to resolve what Napoleon described as the "Spanish Ulcer". As an example of his talent he is said to have bribed the Spanish commander of the strategic city of Badajoz to hand the keys of the garrison to the French. Ducos possesses a book listing a number of enemy officers, British, Portuguese and Spanish, whom he crosses out when they have been killed. He possesses a fervent hope that one day all the names in his book will be crossed out. Sharpe is already listed when their paths cross in 1812, during the events of Sharpe's Battle and in the following months Ducos comes to regard Sharpe as his nemesis, as the latter thwarts several plans to change the course of the war in Spain, particularly by defeating a surprise French invasion of Portugal in the winter of 1812, during which Sharpe had personally insulted Ducos and broken his spectacles (Sharpe's Enemy). In 1813 Ducos finally captures Sharpe and tortures him, destroying Sharpe's telescope (a gift from Wellington) in retaliation for his own smashed spectacles. Sharpe is rescued by the intervention of a former lover, Helene Leroux and escapes after the accidental destruction of the castle.

In 1814, with acute foresight Ducos anticipates the fall of Napoleon and in its wake decides to betray the cause he has served so zealously for years. He steals the Imperial jewels and treasury, in the process implicating Sharpe in the crime and retires to the comfort of a villa in Naples. Unfortunately, he is once again bested by Sharpe, who escapes from custody, captures him and takes him back to Paris to face execution by firing squad; as with Hakeswill, Sharpe chooses to hand Ducos to the proper authorities for justice, rather than killing his enemy himself.

Ducos is described as short, his face scarred by smallpox. Weak and timid when physically confronted, he claims to detest ‘unnecessary violence’ yet is unsympathetic to the suffering of others. He is despised and feared by many of his colleagues, who nonetheless obey and respect him because of the enormous influence he wields. Until his final betrayal of Napoleon, Ducos seems entirely motivated by his dedication to the ideals of the French Revolution, continuing to use the French Republican Calendar long after it has been abandoned by his fellow countrymen (Sharpe's Enemy). He has no personal friends and shows no sexual interest in women or in men, although is not entirely asexual, as in Sharpe's Battle it is said that he visits prostitutes.

In the TV adaptations Ducos was played by Féodor Atkine.

=== Henri-Patrick Lassan ===
Henri-Patrick Lassan
- First appearance: Sharpe's Waterloo (novel)
- Last appearance: Sharpe's Devil (novel)
- Created by: Bernard Cornwell

In-universe information
- Occupation: Soldier
- Nationality: French

Henri-Patrick Lassan is Richard Sharpe and Lucille Castineau's son, born in 1814. He first appears in Sharpe's Waterloo as an infant, whom Lucille has brought to Brussels while waiting for Sharpe to return from the Waterloo Campaign. He is named for Lucille's murdered brother, Henri, and Sharpe's best friend, Patrick (Paddy) Harper. He later appears as a boy of five in the prologue of Sharpe's Devil, taking place in the summer of 1819.

The adult Henri-Patrick is a recurring character in Bernard Cornwell's Starbuck Chronicles, taking place during the American Civil War, when he is in his late forties. He has adopted the surname Lassan (Lucille's maiden name), and admits that he severely disappointed his father by electing to join the French cavalry forces instead of the British Army. Wielding his father's Pattern 1796 heavy cavalry sword, he would go on to serve in both Austria and the Crimean War, losing an eye during his service, albeit rising to the rank of Chasseur Colonel in the Imperial Guard Cavalry. Posted to the United States by the French government as a neutral observer, he voluntarily attaches himself to J.E.B. Stuart's Confederate cavalry.

=== Hélène Leroux ===
Hélène Leroux
- First appearance: Sharpe's Sword (Novels) Sharpe's Honour (Series)
- Last appearance: Sharpe's Honour (Novels)
- Created by: Bernard Cornwell
- Portrayed by: Alice Krige

In-universe information
- Title: La Marquesa de Casares el Grande y Melida Sadaba
- Family: Philippe Leroux (brother)
- Spouses: Luis, Marques de Casares el Grande y Melida Sadaba
- Nationality: French (Novels) Anglo-French (Series)

Hélène Leroux was the French-born wife of the Marques de Casares el Grande y Melida Sadaba. She is described in the novels as fair-haired and fair-skinned. Although married to the Marques, she was well-known for having multiple affairs with high-ranking officers and aristocrats, and was known among the Spanish as La Puta Dorada (The Golden Whore).

During Sharpe's Sword, Hélène (going by the Spanish Helena) takes a liking to Sharpe while her husband is away putting down a rebellion in Brazil. The two become lovers, and Helena falsely admits to being the British spy El Mirador in order to gain Sharpe's confidence and feed information to the French. When Sharpe is wounded by Colonel Leroux, Helena helps nurse him back to health. During a meeting with Father Patrick Curtis, Sharpe finds out Helena is in fact Colonel Leroux's sister, and feeds her false information about Wellington's army retreating to Portugal. Helena gifts Sharpe a horse so he can rejoin the British lines, although he hadn't completely recuperated. In the end, after the British defeat Marshal Auguste de Marmont at the Battle of Salamanca, La Marquesa is allowed to leave Salamanca in the interest of avoiding scandal.

In Sharpe's Honour, Helene is recruited by Major Pierre Ducos to write a letter to her husband claiming Sharpe had insulted her and the Marques, and attempted to rape her. In the following days, Sharpe and the Marques fought an illegal duel, and the Marques was murdered by Spanish partisans loyal to Ducos, leading to Sharpe's arrest and apparent execution. While traveling via coach from Burgos, Helene was captured by Father Hacha and forced into a nunnery. She is saved by Sharpe (on a mission from Major Michael Hogan), all the while hounded by the Spanish partisan El Matarife. Eventually, the two are captured by Helene's lover General Verigny. While Sharpe is under French custody, Helene reveals Ducos' plan to use her late husband's murder as grounds for a Franco-Spanish alliance. Helene and General Verigny depart along with King Joseph's baggage train, but are intercepted by El Matarife's partisans, with Helene being held prisoner. Sharpe defeats Matarife in a duel, freeing Helene. Out of gratitude for her rescue, Helene gifted Sharpe a new telescope, and Lord Wellington, falling for her charms, had promised her and her baggage train safe passage back to France.

Helene's character did not appear in the TV series adaptation of Sharpe's Sword, her place being filled by a young nun known as "Lass." She did appear in the adaptation of Sharpe's Honour, played by South African actress Alice Krige. Her story is changed somewhat from the novels; she claims to be the daughter of a French father and English mother, she had never met Sharpe prior to the events of the episode, and her maiden name is never given.

=== Philippe Leroux ===
Philippe Leroux
- First appearance: Sharpe's Sword (Novels) Sharpe's Sword (TV Series)
- Created by: Bernard Cornwell
- Portrayed by: Patrick Fierry

In-universe information
- Title: Colonel
- Occupation: Soldier
- Family: Hélène Leroux (sister)
- Nationality: French

Philippe Leroux was an officer in the French Imperial Guard, tasked by Emperor Napoleon to do his bidding wherever and whenever. He is described as young and handsome with pale eyes, wielding a Klingenthal-made cavalry saber. He is ruthless, working by fear, torturing his victims to death and then inscribing them with Leroux fecit. (Leroux did this)

In Summer 1812, Leroux was tasked by Napoleon to uncover the identity of the British spy El Mirador. While torturing information out of a priest, Leroux and his escort were chased down by the King's German Legion. Changing places with Captain Paul Delmas (whom he had killed), Leroux is captured by Captain Richard Sharpe and the South Essex Light Company. He gives his parole to the regiment's major Joseph Ford, but later escapes pursued by Lieutenant Colonel Brian Windham. Windham fought bravely, but Leroux killed the colonel with a swift slash across the back, then received sanctuary in a French-held fort outside Salamanca. When the British assault the French-held forts, Leroux disguises himself as a wounded man to escape capture, and winds up in a makeshift hospital in the city's Irish College. While hiding in wait for a fresh horse, Leroux spotted Sharpe and Sergeant Harper, and a fight ensued. Harper was knocked unconscious, while Leroux's sword shattered Sharpe's saber blade, and as Leroux fled, he shot Sharpe in the stomach.

During the Battle of García Hernández, Leroux sought sanctuary in the French infantry squares. However, the King's German Legion cavalry break through the squares at a heavy loss, and Leroux surrenders. Not accepting the surrender, Sharpe (who had survived his wounds) forces Leroux into a duel. The Frenchman is stabbed through the same spot where he shot Sharpe, and then stabbed through the neck. The Rifleman claimed Leroux's Klingenthal saber as his own, along with Leroux's green cavalry overalls.

In the television series, Leroux was portrayed by Patrick Fierry. In a departure from the novel set in Salamanca in 1812, the film was set in 1813 near the Pyrenees, as Lord Wellington made his final push into France.

=== Guy Loup ===
Guy Loup
- First appearance: Sharpe's Battle (Novels) Sharpe's Battle (TV Series)
- Created by: Bernard Cornwell
- Portrayed by: Oliver Cotton

In-universe information
- Title: Brigadier General
- Occupation: Cavalry officer
- Nationality: French

Brigadier General Guy Loup was the commander of the Brigade Loup during the events of Sharpe's Battle. His men were tasked with guarding the mountain passes around the Portuguese-Spanish border. Since "Loup" is the French word for wolf, Loup's men all dressed in drab gray uniforms.

Loup was described in the novels as dressing all in gray with wolf-hair trim on his pelisse and boots. He sported a short gray beard and his face was scarred and battle-hardened, with one bloodshot eye and the other eye milky-white. In order to combat the local partisans, Loup's men kill fifty civilians for each of his men killed by guerrillas. In April 1811, Loup met Sharpe at a village his brigade had previously massacred, looking for his lost men. He offers Sharpe safe passage in exchange for the two men held prisoner, but Sharpe - disgusted by the rape and murder in the village - instead has them executed by firing squad. An enraged Loup then swears a vendetta against Sharpe. Working with Major Pierre Ducos and Spanish agent Doña Juanita de Elia, Loup becomes part of a plot to destroy the British and Portuguese forces along the Spanish-Portuguese border and allow Marshal André Masséna to march into Portugal.

While Sharpe was busy drilling the Real Compañía Irlandesa at the frontier fort of San Isidro, Loup's brigade made a night attack, slaughtering the Portuguese forces inside the fort after Sharpe refused to surrender himself. They are only driven back after Sharpe's old friend, Captain Tom Garrard, blows up the fort's ammunition wagons, killing himself in the process. During the Battle of Fuentes de Oñoro, Loup's brigade attacks the British reserves, but is driven back by Sharpe and the Real Compañía Irlandesa. Sharpe and Loup dueled each other in the Dos Casas Stream. Both men were evenly matched, but Sharpe had the upper hand due to being taller and accustomed to dismounted fighting. In the end, Sharpe caught Loup under his sword, and drowned the Frenchman in the stream.

In the television series, Loup was portrayed by English actor Oliver Cotton. The film adaptation differs somewhat from the original novel, being set during September 1813 near the Pyrenees. Sharpe and Loup's final duel occurs inside the French hideout, with Sharpe running the Frenchman through with his blade.

== German ==
=== Lossow ===
Lossow
- First appearance: Sharpe's Gold (Novels)
- Last appearance: Sharpe's Sword (Novels)
- Created by: Bernard Cornwell

In-universe information
- Title: Captain
- Occupation: Officer
- Nationality: German

Captain Lossow first appears in Sharpe's Gold. He is a cavalry Captain in the King's German Legion, and one of the few people Sharpe considers a friend. He rode a horse named Thor, so called because it "could bite a man's face off or beat an enemy down with its hooves."

Sharpe and Lossow first met in 1810, Lossow recognizing Sharpe's name after the capture of the French Imperial Eagle during the Battle of Talavera. Later, Lossow's squadron would save Sharpe and the South Essex Light Company from an attack by French Lancers. In Almeida, Lossow and his sergeant Helmut stood by as Sharpe set off the powder trail leading to the city's powder magazine.

Lossow would re-appear during the events of Sharpe's Sword, during the Battle of Salamanca in 1812. While Sharpe was convalescing from his wounds, Lossow gifted a crate of stone-bottled beer. Lossow's squadron - accompanied by Sharpe, Harper, and Major Hogan - would then take part in the Battle of García Hernández, breaking through the French squares in pursuit of Colonel Leroux. Whether or not Lossow survived the Battle is left unanswered.

=== Helmut ===
Helmut
- First appearance: Sharpe's Gold (Novels)
- Created by: Bernard Cornwell

In-universe information
- Title: Sergeant
- Occupation: Cavalryman
- Nationality: German

Helmut first appears in Sharpe's Gold. He is a sergeant in the King's German Legion cavalry, under the command of Captain Lossow. He is described as small and squat with bow-legs, but Patrick Harper claims him to be "a one-man army." During the events of Sharpe's Gold, Helmut was among the cavalry that saved Sharpe and the South Essex Light Company from a French Lancer attack, taught swordsmanship to Teresa Moreno, and assisted Sharpe and Harper in setting off the powder magazine in Almeida.

=== Anthony Pohlmann ===
Anthony Pohlmann
- First appearance: Sharpe's Triumph
- Last appearance: Sharpe's Trafalgar

In-universe information
- Title(s): Sergeant, Colonel
- Occupation: Soldier, Turncoat
- Nationality: Hanoverian

Anthony Pohlmann was born in Hanover, and joined the East India Company army, rising to the rank of sergeant. Before the events of Sharpe's Triumph, Pohlmann deserted the East India Company and joined the forces of the Maratha Prince Daulat Scindia, where he rose to the rank of colonel. When Sharpe and Colonel McCandless try to return Madame Lucille Joubert to her husband in Pohlmann's regiment, Pohlmann gives the two men a tour of his forces, and even attempts to recruit Sharpe into Scindia's army with the promise of a lieutenancy. When McCandless is wounded by a thief hired by William Dodd, Pohlmann has the thief trampled to death by one of his elephants. At the Battle of Assaye, Pohlmann is given overall command of Daulat Scindia's forces. Pohlmann planned to trap Major General Arthur Wellesley's forces at what he thought were the only usable fords of the River Kaitna, but General Wellesley surprises him by crossing an unknown ford and flanking the Maratha forces. After the Maratha forces flee in disarray, Pohlmann re-dons his East India Company uniform and runs into Sharpe, though Sharpe lets him go.

Pohlmann would reappear in Sharpe's Trafalgar, traveling under the pseudonym of "Baron von Dornberg". He and Sharpe sail back to Europe on the Calliope, commanded by Captain Peculiar Cromwell. When the Calliope is attacked by the French 74-gunner Revenant, both Pohlmann and Captain Cromwell abscond with Sharpe's collection of jewels aboard the Revenant. This turns out to be what Pohlmann had intended to happen, allowing him and his servant (a secret French agent) to sail to Paris on the Revenant to deliver a treaty from the Maratha princes to the French Government, and send weapons to continue the uprisings against the British in India. During the Battle of Trafalgar, the Revenant is attacked by the HMS Pucelle under the command of Captain Joel Chase, and Pohlmann is killed by a cannonball.

Anthony Pohlmann was inspired by a real-life historical figure of the same name who led Daulat Scindia's forces during the Battle of Assaye. However, the real Anthony Pohlmann re-joined the East India Company as a lieutenant colonel in 1804.

== Spanish ==
=== Father Hacha ===
Tomas Hacha
- First appearance: Sharpe's Honour
- Last appearance: Sharpe's Honour
- Created by: Bernard Cornwell
- Portrayed by: Nickolas Grace

In-universe information
- Title: Father
- Occupation: Inquisitor
- Family: El Matarife (brother)
- Religion: Catholic
- Nationality: Spanish

Father Tomas Hacha was a former inquisitor to the Spanish aristocracy and Spanish priest. He was a large man, much like his partisan brother El Matarife, but like the French spymaster Major Pierre Ducos, Hacha was "part spy, part policeman, and wholly politician, except that his politics were those of the Church."

In Sharpe's Honour, Father Hacha and his brother El Matarife are roped into a plot by Major Ducos to engineer a Franco-Spanish alliance and expel the British from Spain. When the Marques de Casares el Grande y Melida Sadaba challenged Major Richard Sharpe to a duel over letters claiming harassment against La Marquesa, Sharpe and the Marques fought a duel. The evening after the duel, as Father Hacha attended to prayers, Matarife came in to the Marques' bedchambers and murdered the Marques. With La Marquesa a widow, the Marques' will stated that should she join the church as a nun, all her wealth would be transferred to the church and Father Hacha. Thus, as La Marquesa's baggage train made its way to France, Father Hacha engineered her kidnapping, then put her in the Convent of the Heavens with Matarife and his men standing guard. However, Major Sharpe managed to free La Marquesa and return her to French custody. At the end of the novel, after El Matarife lets loose Ducos' plot, Father Hacha is brought in to clear Sharpe's name.

In the TV adaptation of Sharpe's Honour, Father Hacha was portrayed by English actor Nickolas Grace. In departure from the novel, Father Hacha is killed by Major Ducos when his plot falls to ruin.

=== Isabella Harper ===
Isabella Harper (novels), Ramona Harper, née Gonzalez (TV)
- First appearance: Sharpe's Sword (Novels) Sharpe's Enemy (Series)
- Last appearance: Sharpe's Waterloo (Novels) Sharpe's Challenge (Series)
- Created by: Bernard Cornwell
- Portrayed by: Diana Perez

In-universe information
- Spouse: Patrick Harper
- Children: Richard Patricio Augustine Harper (Novels) Patrick José Hagman Harris Cooper Perkins Harper (Series)
- Religion: Catholic
- Nationality: Spanish

Isabella Harper was the Spanish wife of Patrick Harper, described in Sharpe's Sword as small and plump. During the chaos following the Siege of Badajoz, Harper saved Isabella from assault at the hands of marauding soldiers. Since then, he became her protector and lover, as she taught him Spanish and tried to transform him into a better Catholic. In Sharpe's Sword, she helped nurse Captain Richard Sharpe back to health, her and Harper being given a considerable stipend for their troubles thanks to Hélène Leroux. At the end of Sharpe's Honour, Isabella and Harper were married, celebrating with a feast attended by the men of Sharpe's Light Company, and Isabella wearing a dress and veil purloined from King Joseph's wagon train after the Battle of Vitoria. In Sharpe's Regiment, she accompanies Sharpe, Harper, Captain D'alembord and Captain Price to England during a search for the South Essex second battalion. During her time there, she witnesses a play being held in London, and as Sharpe and Harper investigate, she stays with a few of Harper's relatives in Southwark. She eventually returns to Spain with Harper, and the two celebrate the birth of their first child in 1814: Richard Harper. After the Battle of Toulouse in Sharpe's Revenge, Harper set up Isabella and baby Richard in a house in Pasajes until he could arrange passage for them back to Ireland. With his discharge papers signed off by the Duke of Wellington, Harper was able to return to England, then find a fast ship to Spain on which he brought Isabella and Richard home to Ireland. Using gold stolen off the French, Harper and Isabella purchased a tavern in Dublin, just off the city quays. There, Harper engaged in the sale of stolen horses. After Napoleon returned from exile in Sharpe's Waterloo, Harper planned to leave once more to sell horses to the Anglo-Dutch Army, much to Isabella's chagrin, though her fears were soon subsided by Harper's Holy Oath to not engage in any fighting. The two are reunited at the end of Sharpe's Assassin, and apart from another escapade in Sharpe's Devil, remained together in Dublin.

In the television series, Isabella's name was changed to Ramona Gonzalez, played by Colombian actress Diana Perez. In her first appearance during Sharpe's Enemy, she and Harper are already expecting their first child. That child is born in Sharpe's Honour, delivered by Sharpe's chosen men. In honor, she names the child Patrick José Hagman Harris Cooper Perkins Harper. In spite of their first child being born and Ramona already having a wedding frock picked out, Harper is hesitant about marriage due to the reactions the two would receive in Ireland, and the thought of Harper's mother rejecting the union after the death of his previous fiancée. During Sharpe's Sword, Ramona helps nurse a wounded Sharpe back to health, and with the help of Father Patrick Curtis, finally ties the knot with Harper. In Sharpe's Mission, she is accosted and nearly assaulted by one of Colonel Brand's men, only saved in the nick of time by Harper. Ramona and Patrick José eventually return to Ireland with Harper after the Battle of Toulouse, as Harper becomes a horse trader. Ramona's final appearance comes during the opening of Sharpe's Challenge, sitting outside the Duke of Wellington's office waiting to hear news of her husband in India.

=== Teresa Moreno ===
Teresa Moreno
- First appearance: Sharpe's Gold (Novels) Sharpe's Rifles (Series)
- Last appearance: Sharpe's Enemy (Novels) Sharpe's Enemy (Series)
- Created by: Bernard Cornwell
- Portrayed by: Assumpta Serna

In-universe information
- Alias: La Aguja
- Occupation: Partisan
- Spouse: Richard Sharpe
- Children: Antonia
- Religion: Catholic
- Nationality: Spanish

Teresa Moreno (died 27 December 1813) is a fictional character in the novels of Bernard Cornwell. She is a Spanish partisan and the first wife of Richard Sharpe.

Teresa Moreno is the daughter of wealthy Spanish border landowner and one time partisan Cesar Moreno. She first appears in Sharpe's Gold, in the aftermath of a French attack on the village of Casteljada, in which her brother Ramon is tortured and she herself raped. This, in addition to the earlier rape and murder of her mother by the French, fuels her desire for revenge and led to her becoming a leader of a guerrilla force, with the nom de guerre "La Aguja", or "The Needle", after the stiletto knife which is her weapon of choice.

Sharpe takes Teresa hostage to ensure the safety of his men as they escape from the partisan El Catolico. They fall in love, despite Teresa's engagement to El Catolico and form an alliance which delivers to Sharpe the Spanish gold he has been tasked to collect and grants to Teresa leadership of the partisans.

The couple are separated for over a year, until Teresa finds Sharpe in the aftermath of the storming of Ciudad Rodrigo and reveals that she has given birth to their daughter Antonia, in the French held city of Badajoz (Sharpe's Company).

The British are about to besiege the city and Sharpe is determined to be first over the wall to protect his new family. He is foiled by his bitter enemy Sergeant Obadiah Hakeswill, who plans to rape and murder Teresa. Sharpe and his close friend Sergeant Patrick Harper only just arrive in time to prevent the crime. Teresa and Sharpe are married the next morning.

Eighteen months later Teresa and her partisans are involved with Sharpe in an operation to remove a murderous gang of deserters, including Hakeswill, from a remote mountain village. Hakeswill escapes and murders Teresa (Sharpe's Enemy).

Her daughter is adopted by Teresa's brother, Ramon and, as far as is known, never meets her father again.

In the TV adaptations, she was portrayed by Assumpta Serna.

=== El Católico ===
Joaquím Jovellanos
- First appearance: Sharpe's Gold (Novels)
- Last appearance: Sharpe's Gold (Novels)
- Created by: Bernard Cornwell

In-universe information
- Title: El Católico
- Occupation: Partisan
- Religion: Catholic
- Nationality: Spanish

El Católico made his only appearance in Sharpe's Gold as a leader of a group of Spanish partisans near Casatejada. Formerly a colonel in the Spanish Army, El Católico became a partisan leader after the French invasion of Spain. Dressed in gray and riding a black horse, he gained the nickname "El Católico" ("The Catholic") due to his practice of reciting the Latin prayer for the dead over his victims before torturing them to death. By 1810, his guerilla band was joined by another partisan group led by Cesar Moreno, and Moreno's children Ramon and Teresa.

In Sharpe's Gold, El Católico and his men guard a hoard of Spanish gold, which the British plan to recover and ship to the Spanish government in Cádiz. Believing the British will take the gold for themselves, El Católico and his men moved it from the Moreno family tomb to a manure pile outside the city walls. Captain Claud Hardy discovered El Católico's plan, but El Católico stabbed him in the back and buried him in the manure along with the gold. When a party led by Major Kearsey and Captain Sharpe came to recover the gold, El Católico claimed the French had taken it. During a burial at the local cemetery, Sharpe believed the gold was hidden in a freshly-covered unmarked grave. El Católico and his men proceeded to mock Sharpe when his search turned empty, only for Sergeant Harper to show up after discovering the gold stash in the manure pile.

As Sharpe and his men left Casatejada with the Spanish gold, El Católico's men gave chase. Sharpe's company just managed to take shelter in Almeida as French cavalry attacked. However, just as plans are made to transport the gold to Celorico, Sharpe finds out El Católico is in Almeida as well, and planning to retake the gold via government dispatch. Brigadier Cox, the British commander at Almeida, orders Sharpe to surrender the gold to El Católico and join the garrison. Fearing death at the hands of El Católico and needing to deliver the gold as originally ordered, Sharpe and his men faced off against the partisans, eventually coming up against El Católico on the rooftops of the city. The partisan was a far superior swordsman, and Sharpe struggled to gain footing. Eventually, El Católico buried his rapier into Sharpe's right thigh, leaving Sharpe to slice open the Spaniard's skull, and finish him off by stabbing through the throat.

=== El Matarife ===
El Matarife
- First appearance: Sharpe's Honour
- Last appearance: Sharpe's Honour
- Created by: Bernard Cornwell
- Portrayed by: Matthew Scurfield

In-universe information
- Title: El Matarife
- Occupation: Partisan
- Family: Father Tomas Hacha (brother)
- Religion: Catholic
- Nationality: Spanish

El Matarife was a cruel Spanish partisan operating around the hills of Northern Spain. His name meant "the Slaughterman", and was known to force his victims into one-sided duels where he would murder them slowly with a chain, long knife and poleaxe. He was dressed in leather under a wolfskin cloak, and had a thick beard that obscured most of his face.

In Sharpe's Honour, El Matarife and his brother Father Tomas Hacha are employed by Major Pierre Ducos in his plot to engineer a Franco-Spanish alliance and push the British out of Spain. El Matarife is tasked with murdering the Marques de Casares el Grande y Melida Sadaba, framing the murder on Major Richard Sharpe. Then, when Father Hacha kidnapped the Marques' wife, Matarife's men stood guard of the convent where she was held. Unwittingly, though, Matarife allowed Major Sharpe (going by the pseudonym Major Vaughn) into his camp. When Sharpe asked about La Marquesa, El Matarife showed him to a girl that had been savaged by his men in order to throw him off the trail. After Sharpe rescued the real La Marquesa Helene from the convent where she had been held, Matarife gave chase and tracked the two down to an inn. As the partisan was about to murder Sharpe, French forces under General Verigny arrived, liberated Helene, and took the Englishman prisoner. As Helene made her way back to France, her baggage train was ambushed by El Matarife and his men, taking her prisoner once more. As El Matarife made off with her, Sharpe spotted them and caught up, challenging Matarife to a duel with chain and long knife. Sharpe managed to cripple and blind the partisan, yet decided to let him live to confess to his treason against Spain and murder of the Marques. As a final act, Sharpe slit the partisan's throat.

In the TV series adaptation of Sharpe's Honour, El Matarife was played by English actor Matthew Scurfield. During the final battle, instead of Sharpe killing Matarife, the partisan is instead shot dead by Major Mendoza, one of the Marques' staff officers.

=== Don Blas Vivar ===
Don Blas Vivar
- First appearance: Sharpe's Rifles (Novels) Sharpe's Rifles (Series)
- Last appearance: Sharpe's Devil (Novels) Sharpe's Rifles (Series)
- Created by: Bernard Cornwell
- Portrayed by: Simón Andreu

In-universe information
- Title: Count of Mouromorto
- Occupation: Partisan
- Religion: Catholic
- Nationality: Spanish

Captain-General Don Blas Vivar first appears in Sharpe's Rifles as a major. He is described as a deeply religious man, he is very conservative, a believer in honor, he is the rare creature: an honest man. He earns Sharpe's respect.

In Sharpe's Devil he is reported missing while serving as Captain-General of Chile. Louisa approaches Sharpe about going to Chile to find out his fate. Sharpe assumes he is going to the new world to bring back a corpse, but the facts were much stranger than his assumptions.

Don Blas had met with rebels under a flag of truce thinking they wanted to treat with him, they had mistaken him for his Francophile brother, however, and assumed he'd be interested in a plot to free Napoleon. When they discovered their error, they held him prisoner on a remote island while their plots played out.

He was shocked and dismayed that anyone would so abuse the flag of truce and stated his intention to retire from service in a world he no longer understood.

== Portuguese ==
=== Ferragus ===
Farragus Ferreira
- First appearance: Sharpe's Escape (Novels)
- Last appearance: Sharpe's Escape (Novels)
- Created by: Bernard Cornwell

In-universe information
- Occupation: Civilian
- Family: Major Ferreira
- Nationality: Portuguese

Ferragus is a fictional character who features in the Richard Sharpe novels by Bernard Cornwell. Ferragus is the brother of a corrupt Portuguese major who both sold supplies to the French. Ferragus was killed by French musket fire during a fist fight with Sharpe. He is described as being built like a prize fighter and tattooed like a sailor as well as being broader and taller than Harper.

=== Ferreira ===
Ferreira
- First appearance: Sharpe's Escape (Novels)
- Last appearance: Sharpe's Escape (Novels)
- Created by: Bernard Cornwell

In-universe information
- Title: Major
- Occupation: Portuguese Army Officer
- Family: Ferragus Ferreira
- Nationality: Portuguese

Major Ferreira is a fictional character who features in the Richard Sharpe novels by Bernard Cornwell. A corrupt Portuguese major who sold supplies to the French but was eventually detained by Sharpe and his men. He is described as being tall with a carefully trimmed moustache.

=== Josefina LaCosta ===
Josefina LaCosta
- First appearance: Sharpe's Eagle (Novels) Sharpe's Eagle (Series)
- Last appearance: Sharpe's Enemy (Novels) Sharpe's Eagle (Series)
- Created by: Bernard Cornwell
- Portrayed by: Katia Caballero

In-universe information
- Alias: "Lady Farthingdale"
- Title: "Countess"
- Occupation: Courtesan
- Spouse: Duarte (estranged)
- Nationality: English

Portuguese by birth, Josefina LaCosta is to married a nobleman, Duarte, who has fled to South America in the aftermath of the French invasion in 1808, abandoning his wife. She is, however, happy to find herself unencumbered and seeking a wealthy man to provide her with a life of luxury and excitement.

She first appears in Sharpe's Eagle, attaching herself to Lieutenant Christian Gibbons, the nephew of Lieutenant Colonel Sir Henry Simmerson, commander of the South Essex Regiment. Richard Sharpe, temporarily attached to the South Essex, desires LaCosta, which fuels his growing feud with the arrogant Gibbons.

This feud breaks into the open after Gibbons and LaCosta come to blows over a game of cards; Gibbons claims that LaCosta "staked her body" on the next hand, then lost and refused to pay the debt, while LaCosta claims that she was winning and Gibbons attacked her. Sharpe steps in to protect LaCosta from Gibbons and his crony, John Berry. He takes her into his protection and they become lovers, but he is forced to borrow heavily from his friend, Major Michael Hogan to pay for her room and board. Gibbons, smarting over Sharpe's brevet promotion to captain, attempts to provoke Sharpe into a duel by raping and beating LaCosta, with Berry's help. Sharpe takes revenge by killing both men in the confusion of the battlefield. LaCosta deserts Sharpe for a wealthy cavalry officer, Claude Hardy, souring Sharpe's pleasure in his capture of the French Imperial Eagle, during the Battle of Talavera.

In Sharpe's Gold, after Hardy is murdered by a treacherous band of Spanish partisans, in 1810, Sharpe seeks out LaCosta in Lisbon and discovers she has set herself up in business as a courtesan. He is happy to buy her services, despite his growing attachment to Teresa Moreno, his future wife.

LaCosta reappears in Sharpe's Enemy, taking place in 1812, as the supposed wife of Lt. Colonel Sir Augustus Farthingdale, a prominent British diplomat. Sharpe is detailed to rescue "Lady Farthingdale" when she is taken hostage by a gang of deserters led by Sharpe's nemesis, Obadiah Hakeswill, in a remote village on the Portuguese border. When Sharpe discovers that a substantial French force is approaching the village, he blackmails Farthingdale into resigning command, by threatening to reveal the nature of the fake marriage and LaCosta's former profession. With Farthingdale removed, Sharpe is able to hold the border crossing against the French until reinforcements arrive, but in the last moments of the siege, Hakeswill escapes and murders Sharpe's own wife, Teresa.

Sharpe is devastated by his loss, the more so because Teresa had caught him flirting with LaCosta only hours before her death. Meanwhile, Farthingdale returns home to England, deciding that LaCosta is too great a liability to him. When LaCosta writes, bitterly reprimanding Sharpe for his betrayal of her secret and the destruction of her financial future, Sharpe remains unmoved.

In the TV adaptation, Josefina LaCosta appears only in Sharpe's Eagle, played by Katia Caballero. Several changes were made to her history which made her a more sympathetic character.

She is a widow, rather than separated and is courted in earnest by Lt. Gibbons (who, unlike his sadistic counterpart in the novels, is more of a clod), but is drawn to Sharpe, as a genuinely honorable man. When Gibbons attacks her after suborning her maids, she is protected by Sharpe but they do not become lovers, due to the presence of Teresa Moreno in the story, sometime before the couple meet in the novel continuity. Sharpe kills one of her attackers, John Berry, but not Gibbons, who is disgraced along with his Uncle, Sir Henry Simmerson, by the latter's cowardice during the Battle of Talavera. Josefina becomes attached to Captain Thomas Leroy, an American Loyalist on Simmerson's staff and another honorable soldier.

LaCosta does not appear in the television adaptations of Sharpe's Gold or Sharpe's Enemy; her role in that story is taken by an original character with a similar backstory and a previous liaison with Sharpe, Lady Isabella Farthingdale, played by Elizabeth Hurley. Ironically, although Sharpe does not commit adultery with LaCosta in the novel, he does sleep with Isabella Farthingdale in the film.

=== Jorge Vicente ===
Jorge Vicente
- First appearance: Sharpe's Havoc (Novels)
- Last appearance: Sharpe's Escape (Novels)
- Created by: Bernard Cornwell

In-universe information
- Title: Captain
- Occupation: Portuguese Army Officer, Lawyer
- Spouse: Kate Savage
- Religion: Catholic
- Nationality: Portuguese

Jorge Vicente first encounters Richard Sharpe in the aftermath of the first Battle of Oporto in March 1809, when both men are cut off from their respective armies – Sharpe and his riflemen from the British, Lieutenant Vicente with a handful of men from the Portuguese 18th (2nd Oporto) Line Infantry.

Vicente is a studious and idealistic young man, who prior to the French invasion of Portugal studied law at University of Coimbra. His passionate adherence to the rules of war bring him into frequent conflict with Sharpe, but the two men discover a mutual respect as they work and fight together in the weeks leading up to the second Battle of Porto (Sharpe's Havoc).

This is fully vindicated the following year, when both men fight at the Battle of Bussaco, and are again cut off together behind enemy lines in Coimbra. Vicente, now captain of the atirador company in a Portuguese caçadores regiment, has matured into an able soldier, without losing his innate optimism. Vicente's admiration of Sharpe is expressed in his decision to lead a company of sharpshooters in the Portuguese Army's newly formed light infantry regiment (deliberately modeled after the British 95th Rifles, Sharpe's own regiment), and his adoption of many of Sharpe's personal idiosyncrasies, including carrying a 1796 Heavy Cavalry Sword instead of the lighter sword or curved sabre usually carried by light infantry, and a Baker rifle, with which he has become expert after assiduous practice.

He also confides to Sharpe that he married Kate Savage, the daughter and heiress of an English port wine producer, whom he and Sharpe rescued during the French's retreat from Oporto. By the time of Bussaco, she has already given birth to their first child, a daughter. (Sharpe's Escape).

Mary Bickerstaff
- First appearance: Sharpe's Tiger (Novels)
- Last appearance: Sharpe's Tiger (Novels)
- Created by: Bernard Cornwell

In-universe information
- Occupation: Camp Follower/Wife
- Spouse: Sergeant Jem Bickerstaff (Deceased) Kunwar Singh
- Nationality: Indian/British

Vincente does not feature in any of the TV adaptations.

== Indian ==
=== Mary Bickerstaff ===
Mary Bickerstaff first appears in the novel Sharpe's Tiger by Bernard Cornwell. Part British part Indian Mary Bickerstaff grew up in the Calcutta barracks with her British Father and Mother Aruna.

After her parents' death from disease she married sergeant Jem Bickerstaff from the 33rd Regiment of Foot who later died of fever after the regiment transferred to Mysore from Madras. Becoming a widow at age 22 she fell under the wing of Private Sharpe pushing him to be a sergeant.

Mary leaves with Sharpe and William Lawford on their mission to Seringapatam to act as a translator and to escape from Captain Morris and Sergeant Hakeswill who plotted to kidnap her and sell her as a forced prostitute.

While at Seringapatam Mary was separated from Sharpe and was sent to general Appah Rao's house where she burned her western clothes and switched to a sari which led to Sharpe's failure to recognize Mary at their first meeting. After being interrogated by Appah Rao, Mary is given a pistol which she then gives to Sharpe to aid in his escape from the siege.

Mary falls in love with Appah Rao's bodyguard Kunwar Singh later marrying Kunwar and Mary chooses to stay in Seringapatam after the siege.

== Irish ==
=== Father Curtis ===
Patrick Curtis
- First appearance: Sharpe's Sword (Novels) Sharpe's Sword (Series)
- Last appearance: Sharpe's Enemy (Novels)
- Portrayed by: John Kavanagh

In-universe information
- Alias: El Mirador
- Title: Father
- Occupation: Priest, Professor, Spy
- Religion: Roman Catholic
- Nationality: Irish

Father Patrick Curtis was the rector of the Irish College at Salamanca, as well as Professor of Astronomy and Natural History. He served as spymaster of Lord Wellington's intelligence network in Spain, gaining the codename of El Mirador. He is described in the novels as a tall, elderly, gray-haired man, with a face filled with charity and amusement.

In Sharpe's Sword, Father Curtis is in danger due to Colonel Philippe Leroux discovering his identity as El Mirador. As Leroux escaped from British custody, Curtis protected the French Colonel from civilian attack, much to the suspicion of Captain Richard Sharpe. Curtis later introduces Sharpe to la Marquesa de Casares el Grande y Melida Sadaba (in reality Colonel Leroux's sister Hélène). After the British assaults on the French forts surrounding Salamanca, Curtis witnessed Colonel Leroux's escape, and discovered Harper unconscious and Sharpe dying from a bullet wound inflicted by Colonel Leroux. As Sharpe was carried off to the dying ward, Curtis discovered his Baker rifle in the hands of one of the college stonemasons. After Sharpe made his miraculous recovery, Father Curtis returned the rifle in good working order, and revealed to Sharpe that La Marquesa was a spy for Colonel Leroux, and that he himself was El Mirador. However, Colonel Leroux was still loose in the city, making off with a notebook containing all of the British spy network. Luckily, Sharpe was able to defeat Leroux in a duel, keeping the British spyring clandestine. Father Curtis would then make a minute appearance during Sharpe's Enemy, situated in Lisbon during Christmas 1812. His identity in Salamanca had been discovered, so he was forced to relocate to Lisbon, helping out a local priest hearing confessions. When a messenger brought news of the French descending on the Douro River, Curtis in turn forwarded the intelligence to Lord Wellington and Major Hogan.

Father Curtis was played by Irish actor John Kavanagh in the Sharpe television series. During Sharpe's Sword, Father Curtis is stationed at Villafranca, close to the Pyrenees. He assists Sergeant Harper, Ramona, and a young mute novice in nursing Sharpe back to health, and gives Harper an old sabre to be made into a new sword for Sharpe. When the novice is about to be assaulted by Sir Henry Simmerson, Curtis steps in and duels Simmerson to submission. At the end of the episode, Father Curtis presides over the marriage of Sergeant Harper and Ramona.

Father Curtis was based on a real-life historical figure, who did indeed serve as spymaster in Spain. After Napoleon's defeat, he was promoted to Archbishop of Armagh, likely assisted by his relationship with the Duke of Wellington.

=== Lord Kiely ===
Lord Benedict Kiely
- First appearance: Sharpe's Battle (Novels) Sharpe's Battle (Series)
- Created by: Bernard Cornwell
- Portrayed by: Jason Durr

In-universe information
- Title(s): Colonel, Earl of Kiely
- Occupation: Soldier
- Spouse: Lady Lucy Kiely (Series)
- Nationality: Irish

Lord Benedict Kiely was the Colonel of the Real Compañía Irlandesa. His mother had supported Wolfe Tone during the failed Irish Rebellion of 1798, resulting in her and her son emigrating to the Irish population of Spain. Kiely is described in the novels as young, with a thin, tanned face and a fine-pointed mustache.

In Sharpe's Battle, Lord Kiely and the Real Compañía Irlandesa, made up of fellow Irish expatriates, are sent to the San Isidro Fort along the Portuguese-Spanish border to be drilled by Captain Richard Sharpe. During this time, Lord Kiely resorts to drinking and his mistress, rather than commanding his men. He is too prideful to admit fault, even when Sharpe's concerns prove correct. Kiely's mistress, Doña Juanita de Elia (a French agent working for Major Pierre Ducos), circulates counterfeit American newspapers amongst the Irish, prompting them to desert. After a devastating attack on the San Isidro by Brigadier Guy Loup, where many Portuguese allies are killed, the Compañía returned to the main British-Spanish lines. Kiely requested better treatment of his men from Lord Wellington, but was rebuked and told of Doña Juanita's conspiring with the French. After the meeting, Kiely stumbled drunkenly into a church and shot himself through the head.

Lord Kiely was portrayed by English actor Jason Durr in the television series. In Sharpe's Battle, Kiely has a wife - Lady Lucy Kiely - portrayed by British actress Allie Byrne. Lord Kiely blames Lady Kiely for the death of their stillborn child, and carries on with his mistress Doña Juanita de Elia while Lady Kiely looks on. Lord Kiely suffers many the same faults as his novel counterpart, but still recognizes Sharpe as an important ally. In the episode's climax, a pregnant Lady Kiely is kidnapped by Brigadier Loup, and Doña Juanita is revealed as a French traitor. Enraged, Kiely kills Doña Juanita, and leads the Real Compañía Irlandesa into battle against Loup's forces. Lord Kiely manages to break into Loup's quarters to free his wife, but is run through by Brigadier Loup, dying heroically.

== Other ==
=== Cornelius Killick ===
Cornelius Killick
- First appearance: Sharpe's Siege (Novels)
- Created by: Bernard Cornwell

In-universe information
- Title: Captain
- Occupation: American naval officer, privateer
- Nationality: American

Cornelius Killick appears in the novel Sharpe's Siege. He hails from Marblehead, Massachusetts, and captains the American schooner Thuella.

While transporting a cargo of French cannon for the United States Army during the War of 1812, Thuella was attacked by a British frigate, and was forced to seek refuge in the Bassin d'Arcachon, under the guns of the Teste de Buche fort. In exchange for supplies for repairs, Killick came under the employ of the French intelligence officer Major Pierre Ducos, spying on British activities further south at St Jean de Luz. When a force commanded by Royal Navy Captain Horace Bampfylde attacked the Teste de Buche, Killick's crew set up defenses on a nearby ridge, driving off an attack by Bampfylde's Royal Marines. However, a ruse by Major Richard Sharpe took the Teste de Buche by surprise, and a company of the 60th Rifles under command of Captain William Frederickson forced Killick and his men to surrender. Captain Bampfylde intended to hang Killick and his crew, however quick thinking on the part of Frederickson and Sharpe saved Killick and his men, and set them free on an oath of non-aggression.

After the Royal Navy abandoned the Teste de Buche, Killick's crew worked on repairing the Thuella, all the while Sharpe and Frederickson kept a tenuous hold on the Teste de Buche with a handful of riflemen and wounded Royal Marines. Aware of Sharpe's situation, Killick warned of an impending French attack, and hinted about a nearby stash of oyster shells, which could be burned to make quicklime. Use of the quicklime allowed Sharpe's men to hold off a preliminary attack by French forces under General Calvet. Afterwards, Killick was summoned by General Calvet and asked to attack the British forces with the Thuella. Killick declined, of course, due to his non-aggression oath, but blackmail and threat of arrest from Major Ducos forced Killick to go against the oath. The morning of the attack, Killick's guns fired high, and Sharpe, recognizing Killick, surrendered the fort to him. Sharpe and his men were evacuated onto the Thuella as Calvet's forces made one final attack on the Teste de Buche. Killick dropped Sharpe's forces off close to British lines, and in parting, offered Sharpe plenty of brandy should he ever visit Marblehead, Massachusetts.

=== Astrid Skovgaard ===
Astrid Skovgaard
- First appearance: Sharpe's Prey
- Created by: Bernard Cornwell

In-universe information
- Occupation: Spy
- Family: Ole Skovgaard (father)
- Spouse: Nils (deceased)
- Religion: Lutheran
- Nationality: Danish

Astrid Skovgaard was a widow who lived with her father in Copenhagen. She is described as tall, fair-haired and blue-eyed, but dressed in black out of the memory for her deceased husband and infant son.

In Sharpe's Prey, Astrid's father Ole, a local merchant, works as a spy for the British in Copenhagen. Astrid assists Ole in his correspondence with British and Scandinavian merchants, passing on reports to the British spymaster Lord Pumphrey. Second Lieutenant Richard Sharpe seeks them out in the city, trying to escape the British turncoat Captain John Lavisser. However, reports by Lavisser about a potential assassination of the Danish king get printed in the local papers, and Ole locks Sharpe away to await Lavisser. Sharpe manages to escape, though, and saves Ole from being tortured by Lavisser's henchmen. He then meets Astrid and falls in love, the two spending several nights together. Sharpe soon contemplates deserting the army and living with her and Ole in Copenhagen. During the British bombardment of Copenhagen, Sharpe keeps Astrid safe and rescues her father once more from Captain Lavisser, killing the turncoat in the process. However, the destruction of Copenhagen sours relations between Denmark and Great Britain, and Ole ceases his espionage activities for the British. Furthermore, he forbids Sharpe from ever speaking to Astrid again. Sharpe returned to the Army, only after gifting Astrid some recovered gold to help rebuild the local orphanage.

On discovering Ole's decision to turn away from the British, Lord Pumphrey ordered the execution of both Ole and Astrid. Sharpe would not discover their deaths until the events of Sharpe's Havoc, when he meets with Lord Pumphrey once more, claiming both died of contagion. In Sharpe's Fury, he discovers the truth behind their passing, and came very close to murdering Pumphrey in turn, though he backs off, and keeps a wary eye on the spymaster's ploys in future.
