= Sharpe's Havoc =

2003 historical novel by Bernard Cornwell

- First edition cover
- Author: Bernard Cornwell
- Language: English
- Series: Richard Sharpe
- Genre: Historical novels
- Publisher: HarperCollins
- Publication date: 2003
- Publication place: United Kingdom
- Media type: Print (Hardcover and Paperback) and audio-CD
- ISBN: 0-00-712010-9 (first edition, hardback)
- OCLC: 58554408
- Preceded by: Sharpe's Rifles (chronological); Sharpe's Prey (publication)
- Followed by: Sharpe's Eagle (chronological); Sharpe's Escape (publication)

Sharpe's Havoc: Richard Sharpe and the Battle of Oporto is the seventh historical novel in the Richard Sharpe series by Bernard Cornwell, first published in 2003.

The story is set largely in Portugal during General Arthur Wellesley's Oporto Campaign in 1809, part of the Napoleonic Wars.

== Plot summary ==
During a general British and Portuguese retreat from the French after the First Battle of Porto, Captain Hogan orders Lieutenant Richard Sharpe and his men to help find and escort to safety 19-year-old Englishwoman Kate Savage, the daughter of a recently deceased prominent port merchant. For some unknown reason, she ran away from her home in Oporto. Hogan also tells Sharpe to "keep a close eye" on Colonel James Christopher, who has been staying with the Savages and was the one who requested help in retrieving her. After Hogan leaves, however, Christopher dismisses Sharpe and his men.

Sharpe and his detachment, orphaned from the 95th Rifles, are trapped when the French seize Oporto, but are unexpectedly saved by a small detachment of Portuguese soldiers led by Lieutenant Jorge Vicente, a law student in civilian life. Despite his hatred of lawyers, Sharpe gradually comes to respect Vincente.

Christopher was sent by the British Foreign Office to Portugal to evaluate the situation in Portugal. He has instead decided to use the situation to enrich himself. French Marshal Soult would like to declare himself King of Portugal, but his royal ambition does not sit well with many of his officers. Christopher contacts and encourages the potential mutineers, but intends to betray them to Soult. Just in case the French do not conquer Portugal, he also "marries" Kate in a sham ceremony for her substantial inheritance, despite already having a wife in England.

Seen openly collaborating with the French, he assures Sharpe that he is simply on a secret mission for Britain. Sharpe is suspicious of his motives, but Christopher shows him his orders from General Cradock, the commander of the British forces in southern Portugal. Christopher orders Sharpe to wait for him, for perhaps a week, and leaves Kate under his protection. Christopher then negotiates with the French, offering the identities of the mutineers and other information in return for a monopoly on the port trade in Oporto. Christopher's Portuguese servant deserts him and tells Sharpe that Christopher has betrayed Sharpe to the French as a token of good faith. Fortunately, Sharpe defeats the French detachment sent to kill him and his men. The riflemen escape and seek to rejoin the main British force.

Sharpe spots three barges and a small boat overlooked by the French, who have burned all the boats they can find. He makes contact with a senior British officer, who is delighted by the news of the boats. General Wellesley, Cradock's replacement, has been seeking a way across the Douro River. The British send a division and artillery across to occupy a seminary dominating Soult's lines of communications. The French make desperate, but futile attempts to seize it. The British position is far too strong, and the French are slaughtered.

In the aftermath of the British victory and the French retreat, Sharpe informs Wellesley and Foreign Office dignitary Lord Pumphrey of Christopher's treason. He is ordered to dispose of Christopher before he can divulge more secrets.

Portuguese forces cut off one retreat route, forcing the French to abandon their heavy equipment and plunder as they flee along a mountain road. Sharpe, Vicente, and some of their men race ahead of the French, seeking Christopher. The French manage to capture both bottleneck bridges from Portuguese irregulars and escape, but Sharpe finds and kills Christopher (and one of his riflemen who deserted) and rescues Kate.

== Characters in Sharpe's Havoc ==
- Richard Sharpe, a lieutenant in the 95th Rifles
- Patrick Harper, a sergeant in the Rifles, Sharpe's right-hand man
- Lieutenant Colonel Christopher, a turncoat Foreign Office spy who wants to sell military secrets in return for favours from the conquering French
- Captain Michael Hogan, an Irish engineering officer who serves Wellesley as his spy master
- Jorge Vicente, a young, inexperienced Portuguese lieutenant
- Major Dulong, a brave French opponent of Sharpe
- Lord Pumphrey, an agent of the British Foreign Office
- Kate Savage, teenage daughter of an English port maker, raised in Portugal

=== Historical figures ===
- Jean-de-Dieu Soult, Marshal of France, commander of the French army in Portugal
- Arthur Wellesley, new head of the British forces in the peninsula
- Edward Paget, British commanding general during the Second Battle of Porto
- Major General Rowland "Daddy" Hill, a brigade commander during the battle. Later appears in Sharpe's Eagle.

== Allusions to other Sharpe novels ==
- Turncoat British officers are recurring antagonists in several of Cornwell's later-published Sharpe novels, especially those taking place during the early phase of the Peninsular War (notably Sharpe's Trafalgar and Sharpe's Prey). In addition to a general opportunism—seeking personal gain amid the chaos of war—what each of these characters have in common is the conviction that the French under Napoleon will be the inevitable victors in the war and the smartest thing to do is side with them in any way possible. Such belief was apparently widespread during the early years of the war, given the French's series of victorious battles against the Austrians and Russians, and the small size of the British expeditionary force in comparison to the French armies it confronted.
- Lord Pumphrey re-appears after his introduction in Sharpe's Prey. His internal thoughts confirm that he ordered the murders of Sharpe's love interest from that novel, Astrid, and her father, which Sharpe himself will not discover until the events of Sharpe's Fury which takes place two years later.
- In the subsequent novel, Sharpe's Escape, Kate has married Jorge and given birth to their daughter.
- Cornwell lampoons Marshal Soult by showing him arguing with his cook about the menu for that evening's dinner, while the British are crossing the river. The cook is named as Sergeant Deron, who later becomes "Marshal Pot-au-feu," the commander of an army of deserters and a leading antagonist of Sharpe's Enemy.

== Historical references ==
- In his historical note, Cornwell said that he based the character of Major Dulong on the real-life Dulong, who is mentioned only briefly in the histories as a valorous French officer who almost single-handedly saved Soult's army during the retreat by leading an attack on the Portuguese roadblock. Cornwell calls Dulong "a rather Sharpe-like figure," and even bases his appearance on that of Sharpe, as described in the earlier novels.
- Christopher emulates Marshal Andre Massena, in having Kate dress in a man's Hussar uniform that shows off her figure.

== Publication history ==
It is the twentieth full-length novel in the series in order of publication, and takes place between the events of Sharpe's Rifles and Sharpe's Eagle.

- Cornwell, Bernard (7 April 2003). Sharpe's Havoc (1st ed.). London: Harper Collins. ISBN 0-00-712010-9.
