= Sharpe's Battle =

1995 historical novel by Bernard Cornwell

- First edition
- Author: Bernard Cornwell
- Language: English
- Series: Richard Sharpe stories
- Genre: Historical novels
- Publisher: HarperCollins
- Publication date: 8 May 1995
- Publication place: United Kingdom
- Media type: Print (Hardcover and Paperback) and audio-CD
- Pages: 288 pp (hardcover edition); 368 pp (paperback edition)
- ISBN: 0-00-224307-5 (hardcover edition); ISBN 0-00-647324-5 (paperback edition)
- OCLC: 32390780
- Preceded by: Sharpe's Fury (chronological); Sharpe's Devil (publication)
- Followed by: Sharpe's Company (chronological); Sharpe's Tiger (publication)

Sharpe's Battle is the twelfth historical novel in the Richard Sharpe series by Bernard Cornwell, first published in 1995. The story is set during the Peninsular War in Spain in 1811.

== Plot summary ==
While lost near the Spanish-Portuguese border, Sharpe and his company surprise a group of French soldiers in unusual grey uniforms, caught in the act of raping a teenage Spanish villager. They kill some Frenchmen and take two prisoner. During a parlay, their leader, Brigadier-General Guy Loup, offers to give Sharpe safe passage in exchange for the men, but Sharpe, appalled by the rape and massacre of the other villagers, including children, orders the prisoners shot. (Loup reveals that he counters the atrocities committed by Spanish guerrillas by having his men commit more heinous ones.) Loup swears to avenge them.

Back at headquarters, Sharpe is informed by Major Michael Hogan that the Real Compania Irlandesa, the royal bodyguard of the captive King of Spain, have been sent to join Wellesley's forces. As the British wish for Wellesley to be appointed Generalissimo of the Spanish Armies, it is imperative that the unwanted soldiers be treated with honour, though they are composed of Irish exiles and their descendants (who have no love for the British due to their occupation of Ireland) and have no combat experience. Wellesley assigns Sharpe to encourage them to desert by taking them to a fort close to the French and drilling them mercilessly. There Sharpe also has to deal with former Wagon Master-General Colonel Claude Runciman, a grossly fat and indolent man.

Pierre Ducos, a French intelligence officer answering to Napoleon himself, has planted an agent within the Compania Irlandesa, Dona Juanita de Elia, a Spanish noblewoman, the mistress both of the unit's commander, Lord Kiely, and of Loup. False rumours of British atrocities in Ireland, backed up by forged American newspapers, target not only the Compania, but also the many Irishmen in the British army. Despite knowing Wellesley's intentions, Sharpe decides to turn the demoralised exiles into real soldiers. He persuades Runciman to divert arms and ammunition to the Compania, and conspires with a local partisan, El Castrador, to kill and mutilate some deserters, making it look like the French are responsible, to deter further desertions.

The Compania are joined at the fort by a Portuguese infantry battalion. Sharpe, concerned by the threat posed by Loup's personal vendetta against him, acknowledges his illegal execution of Loup's men to a few officers. That night, Loup attacks the fort, massacres the Portuguese, and is only driven off when Sharpe's friend, Tom Garrard, sacrifices himself to blow up the ammunition wagons.

Sharpe's carelessly public admission and the imminent enquiry into the disaster endanger his career. Wellesley, though reluctant, is willing to make him a scapegoat to conciliate the Portuguese. To avoid this, Sharpe attacks Loup's hideout but finds it deserted, except for Dona Juanita, who is exposed as the enemy agent, and courier of the forged newspapers. Sharpe sleeps with Juanita, and lets her go the following morning, thus frustrating Hogan's hopes of uncovering her accomplice in the Compania.

The disgraced Kiely commits suicide, and his funeral is presided over by the regiment's chaplain, Father Sarsfield. In a private conversation over the open grave, Hogan informs Sarsfield that he is aware of his treachery, but lacks proof. Sarsfield attempts to kill Hogan, but is shot by Sharpe, and buried with Kiely.

The French, led by Marshal André Masséna, prepare to cut the British off from their only route of retreat and bring Wellesley to battle.

Wellington concentrates his forces at the village of Fuentes de Onoro. Still in disgrace, Sharpe, Runciman and the Real Compania Irlandesa are assigned to guard the ammunition wagons. French assaults push the British out of the village and steadily back up a hill. Wellington releases his reserves, who drive the French back into the village. However, the British are in turn counter-attacked by the Loup Brigade. With Sharpe's encouragement, Runciman "offers" to throw the Compania into the fray. They turn the tide of battle; as the Loup Brigade falters, the French fall back, and Wellington sends his men forward, winning the battle.

During the fighting, Loup and Sharpe duel in the ford over the river. Sharpe is shot and wounded by the Dona Juanita, who is in turn killed by Harper. Despite his wound, Sharpe disarms and drowns Loup. The Real Compania Irlandese are sent to the Spanish Junta in Cadiz with honour. The case against Sharpe and Runciman is dropped, in light of their bravery and the deaths of all eyewitnesses to Sharpe's admission other than Runciman, who lies on Sharpe's behalf.

== References to other novels ==
- Loup pleaded for the lives of his men in much the same way that Sharpe has done in previous novels. Vengeance is not a characteristic lacking in Sharpe.
- Garrard and Sharpe met in Sharpe's Tiger in the ranks. They both stayed in the army, but Garrard enlisted in the Portuguese Army where he was promoted to captain. We see the contrast between the reluctance of the British Army to have commissioned officers from the ranks, while the Portuguese army encourages the practice. Had Sharpe enlisted in the Portuguese army, he would likely have been a Major, instead of a captain. As it was Sharpe and Harper who blew up the magazine in Almeida in Sharpe's Gold, Garrard's selfless act is an interesting twist.
- After engaging in a scuffle in Loup's bedroom, Sharpe and Juanita have sex. She steals Perkins' jacket before she leaves the hideout. Perkins, a teenage Rifleman, is featured in the television series but this is the first novel (as written; second, per historical sequence) where he appears. In the first Sharpe novel written, Sharpe's Eagle, Cornwell features a teenage Rifleman named Pendleton (who dies at Talavera). In this novel, set two years after Talavera, Pendleton is again mentioned. This is likely a mistake by Cornwell, who has admitted not to have re-read "Eagle". In a similar vein, the earlier novel Sharpe's Rifles had featured a rifleman named Cooper who was killed during the retreat to Corunna. The character survived and became a recurring character in the television adaptations and reappears in this novel (and others set after Corunna) without any explanation. In a further nod to the television series, the novel is dedicated to Sean Bean who portrays Sharpe.
- Runciman never appears in any subsequent book and we are told was sent to England to become commander of the Militia.

== Film and TV adaptations ==
This novel was dramatised on ITV in 1995 and is a relatively faithful adaptation of the novel. Ducos and Sarsfield do not appear in the film and Lord Kiely has a wife. The plot remains largely the same with regard to the French circulating newspapers describing imaginary massacres in Ireland by British troops in the hope that Irish soldiers will desert. Major Munro clearly reprises the role of Major Hogan in the novel. The film ends with the destruction of the Loup Brigade and does not deal with the events of Fuentes de Onoro. Kiely is killed by Loup in the film, rather than committing suicide; also Rifleman Perkins dies, while in the book he survives.
