= Sharpe's Assassin =

2021 novel by Bernard Cornwell

- First edition cover
- Author: Bernard Cornwell
- Language: English
- Series: Richard Sharpe stories
- Genre: Historical novel
- Publisher: HarperCollins
- Publication date: 30 September 2021
- Publication place: United Kingdom
- Media type: Print (Hardback) and audiobook
- Pages: 400 pp (first edition, hardback)
- ISBN: 0-00-818401-1 (first edition, hardback)
- Preceded by: Sharpe's Waterloo (chronological); Sharpe's Fury (publication)
- Followed by: Sharpe's Devil (chronological); Sharpe's Command (publication)

Sharpe's Assassin is the twenty-first historical novel in the Richard Sharpe series by Bernard Cornwell, published in 2021. The story is set in June 1815, immediately after the Battle of Waterloo, and during the occupation of Paris.

== Plot summary ==
Lieutenant-Colonel Richard Sharpe, in command of the Prince of Wales' Own Volunteers, is tasked by the Duke of Wellington to precede the main British army into France and rescue a prisoner from the citadel in the commune of Ham. Accompanied by his friend, retired Sergeant Major Patrick Harper and exploring officer Major Vincent, Sharpe uses a ruse de guerre to capture the fortress. They rescue the prisoner, an art dealer and British spy named Alan Fox.

Upon returning to the army, Sharpe is appalled to find that the newly arrived Major Charles Morris, who had Sharpe flogged in India, (Note: As depicted in Sharpe's Tiger (1997)) has been given command of his battalion due to a shortage of experienced officers. After threatening to flog Morris if he flogs any of the men during his absence, Sharpe is dispatched with Fox to Paris with Harper and some picked men to investigate a rumoured plot by a Bonapartist cabal calling themselves La Fraternité to assassinate Wellington, Prince Blücher, Louis XVIII, and other allied leaders. Despite Fox's insistence on secrecy, Sharpe informs his lover, Lucille Castineau, of his mission. She then passes on a request from her host, the Dowager Countess of Maubeuges, to evict deserters who have occupied her Parisian mansion.

After arriving in Paris, Sharpe and Fox meet with Fox's informant, Felix Collignon, who springs an ambush. With the aid of Harper and his men, Sharpe captures Collignon, and, after Fox has interrogated him, kills him. Collingnon had given up two names — General Delaunay and Colonel Lanier — and Fox leaves to find and question one of the men alone, over Sharpe's objections. When Fox does not return, Sharpe presumes he has been captured. Fearing that the warehouse is known to La Fraternité, he takes his men to the dowager countess's mansion and attacks in the middle of the night, killing some deserters and evicting the survivors. The next day, Sharpe sees French troops raid the warehouse, confirming his fears.

Sharpe learns that the Delaunay family owns a vineyard on the outskirts of Paris, and that evening takes his men to investigate. After sneaking into the Delaunay home, Sharpe finds himself held at gunpoint by Madame Delaunay, the general's English wife, who informs him that her husband had been killed at Waterloo, and that Fox is her captive. Curious, she test-fires Sharpe's rifle, but the recoil injures her, and Sharpe easily disarms her. His men overpower the guards.

Sharpe questions Madame Delaunay, who confesses that La Fraternité was formed by her husband from loyalist soldiers to avenge Napoleon if he were killed in battle. Fox dismisses it as "medieval claptrap" that likely died with the general, though Sharpe believes otherwise. Sharpe and his men withdraw under fire back to the Maubeuges mansion. Sharpe returns with Harper to the vineyard the next morning and discovers an entire infantry battalion stationed there, commanded by Colonel Lanier.

Several days later, the allied armies march into Paris, enabling Fox to return to his official duty of cataloguing and returning to its original owners art in the Louvre stolen by the French. Wellington is unconvinced of Sharpe's claim that Lanier is hiding troops in the Delaunay vineyard after a search finds nothing, but after failed attempts on Sharpe and Wellington's lives by Lanier's men, he orders an attack on the vineyard.

Sharpe leads the light company through a smuggling tunnel from a nearby tavern into the Delauany house but is wounded in the shoulder. Three Prussian companies assist the South Essex in a frontal attack on the house and warehouse through the vineyard, but Morris holds the South Essex back. Sharpe eventually re-joins his men and turns the tide of battle. Lanier challenges Sharpe to single combat, with the loser's troops withdrawing. Sharpe agrees, but then orders Morris to take his place, as he is wounded. When Morris refuses, Sharpe has him arrested for cowardice in the face of the enemy, then accepts Lanier's challenge. Lanier uses his superior fencing skills to further wound Sharpe, but rather than kill him, instead gives Sharpe the opportunity to yield. Sharpe instead resorts to "gutter fighting", breaking Lanier's sword arm and forcing him to yield. Lanier confirms that he is the last member of La Fraternité, and is allowed to peacefully depart from Paris with his men.

Later, Morris resigns his commission rather than face a court martial. Wellington confirms Sharpe's promotion to lieutenant-colonel, but Sharpe decides to retire and hand command of the battalion to Peter D'Alembord, though Sharpe agrees to return to service in the future should Britain need him.

One year later, Sharpe, retired to his and Lucille's farm in Normandy, receives a letter from Harper informing him of the birth of his son, Richard.

== Publication history ==
- 2021, UK, HarperCollins ISBN 0-00-818401-1, 30 September 2021, Hardback
- 2021, USA, Harper ISBN 0-06-256326-2, 7 December 2021, Hardback
