= Sharpe's Gold (TV programme) =

- Based on: Sharpe's Gold by Bernard Cornwell
- Screenplay by: Nigel Kneale
- Directed by: Tom Clegg
- Starring: Sean Bean; Daragh O'Malley; Hugh Fraser; John Tams; Michael Mears; Jason Salkey; Lyndon Davies; Hugh Ross; Rosaleen Linehan; Jayne Ashbourne
- Country of origin: United Kingdom
- Original language: English

Production
- Running time: 100 minutes

Original release
- Network: ITV
- Release: 12 April 1995

Related
- Sharpe's Honour; Sharpe's Battle

Sharpe's Gold is a 1995 British television drama, the sixth of a series screened on the ITV network that follows the career of Richard Sharpe, a British soldier during the Napoleonic Wars. Despite its name, the drama has almost nothing in common with the novel of the same name by Bernard Cornwell. Scriptwriter Nigel Kneale explained, "I didn't use much of [the book]. I used the first ten pages, I think. Then I had an idea which would be more fun to do. It was all about magic by the time I was through with it."

== Plot summary ==
It is summer 1813. Lord Wellington is preparing to invade France from Spain after winning the campaign on the Iberian peninsula.

Meanwhile, Major Richard Sharpe gets into serious trouble when he threatens Cavalry Staff Corps Lieutenant Ayres with his rifle, to save one of his riflemen, Skillicorn, from being executed for "stealing" a chicken. To maintain discipline in his army, Wellington makes Sharpe apologise to Ayres.

Bess Nugent and her daughter Ellie, arrive unannounced from Ireland to visit their cousin, Wellington. They are there to search for Bess's husband, Will, who has gone missing after a solo trip into the Spanish interior. Wellington refuses to assist their foolhardy mission, demanding they go home. Sharpe and Ellie find themselves attracted to each other, and they engage in a friendly shooting match at 100 yards. Several of the officers and men place bets on the contest; Sharpe throws the match so Ellie will win, but Ellie notices and demands he finishes, which then wins him the contest.

Wellington assigns Sharpe the task of handing over 50 rifles in exchange for some British deserters caught by a feared Spanish guerrilla leader named El Casco. Provost Marshal Lieutenant Ayres and his men accompany Sharpe, as do the two ladies, who lie and say Wellington approved it, forcing Sharpe to take them along for their protection. On the way, they repel an attack by French cavalry led by inexperienced Lieutenant Barbier. Ellie becomes distraught after having to shoot and kill a young Frenchman. When Sharpe tries to comfort her away from the others, they have sex.

The trade goes as planned. However, Ellie then discovers that one of the deserters has her father's pipe. When Sharpe refuses to begin a search, the Nugents ride off, forcing Sharpe to go after them. The riflemen spot Barbier's detachment and drive them off with a surprise attack.

The ladies encounter El Casco's men; Bess is killed and Ellie taken captive. When she is taken to El Casco's cave lair, she finds her father, though he has become deranged. Sharpe tracks them down with the help of Barbier, who is now alone after his men were captured and had their hearts cut out while still alive by the partisans (who believe they are descendants of shipwrecked Aztecs). Sharpe attacks the Spaniards and rescues Ellie and her father. El Casco kills Ayres and wounds Sharpe, but is killed by Sergeant Harper. The cave is full of Aztec treasure, Sharpe and his men blow the entrance to block it with rubble. Back at camp, Will recovers his senses and thanks Sharpe.

== Cast ==
- Sean Bean as Sharpe
- Daragh O'Malley as Harper
- Hugh Fraser as Wellington
- John Tams as Hagman
- Michael Mears as Cooper
- Jason Salkey as Harris
- Lyndon Davies as Perkins
- Hugh Ross as Mungo Munro
- Rosaleen Linehan as Bess Nugent
- Jayne Ashbourne as Ellie Nugent
- Peter Eyre as Will Nugent
- Abel Folk as El Casco
- Philip McGough as Provost Marshal
- Ian Shaw as Ayres
- Julian Sims as Barbier
- Diana Perez as Ramona
- Philip Dowd as Skillicorn
- Peter-Hugo Daly as Rodd
- Nicholas McGaughey as Tripper
- Jake Abraham as Donkin
- Jonathan McGuinness as Bewley

This marks the last episode the character of chosen man Rifleman Francis Cooper is seen.

== Production ==
According to Jason Salkey, who played Rifleman Harris, the episode was originally cast with different actors, and had to be re-scripted to avoid paying this original cast as well. This is one reason it differs greatly from the book, and is not thought highly of by lead actor Sean Bean.
