= Sharpe's Skirmish =

1999 short story by Bernard Cornwell

- Original 1999 edition
- Author: Bernard Cornwell
- Language: English
- Series: Richard Sharpe stories
- Genre: Historical short story
- Publisher: HarperCollins
- Publication date: 1999 (Original Limited Edition Paperback); 2002 (Revised Extended Paperback edition)
- Publication place: United Kingdom
- Media type: Print (Paperback)
- Pages: 63 pp (Revised extended paperback edition)
- ISBN: 978-0-9722220-0-6 (Revised extended paperback edition)
- OCLC: 51160220
- Preceded by: Sharpe's Sword
- Followed by: Sharpe's Enemy

"Sharpe's Skirmish" is a historical short story by Bernard Cornwell in the Richard Sharpe series.

"Sharpe's Skirmish" was first written in 1998. British bookseller W. H. Smith, devised the idea of giving away a Sharpe short story with every copy of Sharpe's Fortress, which Cornwell states he wrote in a few days. This irritated other publishers, and only a few thousand copies were printed. Much later, he revised and expanded it; it was published by the Sharpe Appreciation Society.

== Plot ==
Revised, expanded version

This short story occurs after Sharpe's Sword in the summer of 1812. Sharpe and his Light Company are assigned to guard commissary officer Major Tubbs and his assistants at an abandoned Spanish fort, where a cache of thousands of French muskets has been found, forgotten in the general French retreat in northern Spain. Unbeknownst to the British, French Major Ducos has persuaded Marshal Soult to give him a detachment of 4000 infantry and 2000 cavalry commanded by Soult's best cavalry general, Jean Harault, to launch a surprise raid to threaten the Lord Wellington's supply lines and hopefully force the British to retreat to Portugal. To accomplish this, the French first need to secure the fort, which guards a bridge across the Tormes River. However, Sharpe stands in the way, and for the first (but by no means last) time thwarts a scheme devised by Ducos.

== Characters in "Sharpe's Skirmish" ==
=== British and allies ===
- Captain Richard Sharpe, a captain in the British Army, commanding the Light Company of the South Essex Regiment
- Teresa Moreno, Sharpe's wife, a Spanish partisan
- Sergeant Patrick Harper, Sharpe's right-hand man and friend
- Lieutenant Harry Price, one of Sharpe's officers
- Major Lucius Tubbs
- Mr. MacKeon, Tubbs' Scottish assistant and ex-soldier who fought alongside Sharpe at the storming of Gawilghur in India; MacKeon gives Sharpe invaluable advice that saves the day for the British
- Captain Lossow, German officer in the King's German Legion and Sharpe's friend; Lossow arrives with reinforcements just when it seems Sharpe will be overwhelmed by sheer numbers

=== French ===
- Major Pierre Ducos, one of Napoleon's confidants, sent by the Emperor to evaluate (and hopefully remedy) the situation in Spain
- Marshal Jean-de-Dieu Soult
- General Jean Harault
- Captain Michel Pailleterie, trusted commander of Harault's elite hussar company, sent ahead to capture the fort
- Sergeant Coignet, one of Pailleterie's men

== Allusions to actual history, geography and current science ==
References are made to incidents during the Peninsular War and the Siege of Gawilghur. Lieutenant General Wellington is based on the real historical figure of the same name with limited dramatic licence taken.

== Publication history ==
- 1999, UK, HarperCollins, published 1 March 1999, Limited Edition Paperback
- 2002, UK, Sharpe Appreciation Society ISBN 978-0-9722220-0-6, published 2 September 2002, Revised Extended Paperback Edition
