= Sharpe's Company =

1982 historical novel by Bernard Cornwell

- First edition
- Author: Bernard Cornwell
- Language: English
- Series: Richard Sharpe stories
- Genre: Historical novels
- Publisher: Collins (UK); Viking Press (US)
- Publication date: 10 May 1982
- Publication place: United Kingdom
- Media type: Print (hardback & paperback) and audio-CD (Audio book)
- Pages: 280 pp (Hardback edition); 268 pp (Paperback edition)
- ISBN: 0-00-222131-4 (Hardback edition); ISBN 0-00-616573-7 (Paperback edition)
- OCLC: 8540220
- Preceded by: Sharpe's Battle (chronological); Sharpe's Gold (publication)
- Followed by: Sharpe's Sword

Sharpe's Company is a historical novel in the Richard Sharpe series by Bernard Cornwell, first published in 1982. It was the third in the series to be published, but is thirteenth in chronological order. The story covers January to August 1812, featuring the Siege of Badajoz during the Peninsular War.

== Plot summary ==
The British Army attacks Ciudad Rodrigo, a fortress guarding the northern path into Spain. Sharpe and Harper lead an assault on the French. Unfortunately, Sharpe's commander and friend, Colonel William Lawford, is severely wounded when a mine is detonated. He loses an arm and retires from his post as commander of the South Essex regiment, losing Sharpe a friend and ally.

Sharpe's situation only gets worse when his old arch-enemy, Sergeant Obadiah Hakeswill, joins the company. Hakeswill (an obnoxious and demented psychopath) hates Sharpe with a vengeance and plans to kill him.

Meanwhile, Sharpe's lover Teresa Moreno arrives, informing Sharpe that she has given birth to his daughter Antonia, and that she is living in Badajoz. Sharpe promises her that he will protect her when the British Army attacks the city, as after the fighting in Ciudad Rodrigo, the British army sacked the city raping its women. He is also reunited with his former Lieutenant, Robert Knowles, who is now a captain of a fusilier company. Knowles also vows to protect Teresa.

Later, Hakeswill encounters Teresa in a stable. He attempts to rape her, but she fights him off, slashing his face and wrist. Sharpe and Harper enter the stable, and Harper brutally beats Hakeswill. Hakeswill vows revenge on Harper and to have Teresa.

Lawford's replacement, Colonel Brian Windham arrives, as well as Captain Rymer, who has purchased his commission to command Sharpe's Light Company, a normal practise in the British Army. Sharpe's promotion to captain is reversed by Windham, who although instantly liking Sharpe, does not like officers drawn from the file, and does not need another captain. Sharpe desires to join the Forlorn Hope so that, despite the high chance of death, he may be promoted again, and so that, should he die, Antonia can be proud of her father.

Once again a lieutenant, Windham tells Sharpe vacancies will soon become available, as Wellington is determined to attack the formidable fortress at Badajoz as soon as possible, and casualties are expected to be high. Sharpe is given command of the regiment's baggage, ordered to guard it while the regiment digs trenches around the city. Sharpe leaves the baggage to visit his company, and when Rymer attempts to talk to him, the French attack. Rymer does nothing, so Sharpe leads his men into battle. The French are defeated, but in Sharpe's absence the regiment's baggage is robbed by Hakeswill.

Windham is furious with Sharpe for abandoning his post, and is further angered when he discovers that a beloved portrait of his wife has been stolen. Sharpe's telescope is also missing, which makes Windham accuse the Light Company. He searches the packs of all the members of the Light Company, and the frame, but not the picture, is found in Harper's bag. Windham has Harper demoted to private and flogged. Meanwhile, Hakeswill begins talking into his Shako all the time.

A few nights later, Windham sends the Light Company on a night attack to destroy a dam. He asks Sharpe to serve as his aide. Before the attack, Harper's seven-barrelled gun is taken from him by Hakeswill, as it is a non-regulation weapon. When the Light Company takes longer than expected, Windham orders Sharpe to find out the cause of the delay - stressing he is to do nothing else - and report back as soon as possible. The accompanying engineers light a fuse to detonate barrels full of gunpowder, but it becomes dislodged. Sharpe decides to blow the wall himself. He succeeds, but it turns out the engineers miscalculated, and the dam remains intact. During the fighting, Hakeswill tries to kill Sharpe using Harper's seven-barrelled gun, but only wounds him in the leg.

Windham decides to remove Sharpe temporarily to allow Rymer to establish his authority, though he knows Sharpe is a brilliant soldier. He also orders the riflemen to abandon their rifles, which Rymer, at Hakeswill's prompting, blames the mission's failure on, as well as their green jackets. As Hakeswill taunts the disarmed riflemen, Sharpe humiliates Hakeswill by firing the rifles, which are supposed to be unloaded, at Hakeswill's belly. Hakeswill is more than ever determined to get revenge, and also plans to get to Teresa in Badajoz before Sharpe does.

Sharpe is interviewed by the army commander, the Duke of Wellington, a few days later after Sharpe has scouted the enemy fortifications closely. Wellington decides to attack that night, but denies Sharpe the forlorn hope. Sharpe is ordered to simply guide the various regiments into their positions. However, he rejoins his regiment, which has been devastated by the French cannon fire. Windham is bravely trying to lead his men into the breach, and when Sharpe reaches his company, he discovers Rymer has been shot dead, so he takes command of his company.

Meanwhile, Knowles has managed to reach the top of the French wall and leads his men into the city, during the 3rd Division (United Kingdom)'s diversionary assault. While his men kill the French and plunder the homes, Knowles looks for Teresa to protect her. Knowles reaches Teresa's house, and Teresa lets him in, but Hakeswill, who had hidden himself under dead bodies during the assault, climbs to the upstairs room where Antonia is sleeping. When Teresa enters the room, he threatens to kill the baby unless Teresa has sex with him. Knowles tries to intervene and is shot dead.

Meanwhile, Sharpe leads his men through one of the three breaches in the fortifications. Other British units break through at other points as well. Sharpe and Harper fight their way through the French to reach Teresa, and comes face to face with Hakeswill. Harper picks up Hakeswill's discarded shako and finds the picture of Windham's wife inside it, whom Hakeswill believes to be his mother. Harper threatens to destroy the picture unless Hakeswill releases Antonia. Hakeswill complies, but though Harper, Sharpe, and Teresa all attempt to kill him, they interfere with each other, allowing him to escape by leaping out a window. Hakeswill deserts.

At the end of the battle, Windham praises Sharpe for his bravery. Sharpe returns his wife's portrait, explaining who had it, and Windham apologizes to Harper. Sharpe and Harper have their ranks restored, and Sharpe and Teresa are married.

== Film, TV or theatrical adaptations ==
A 1994 TV adaptation of the same name was produced by Central Independent Television for the ITV network in the UK starring Sean Bean, Daragh O'Malley and Assumpta Serna.

== Publication history ==
- 1982, UK, Collins ISBN 0-00-222131-4, 10 May 1982, Hardback
- 1982, USA, Viking Press ISBN 0-670-63944-3, 10 May 1982, Hardback
- 1994, UK, Harper Collins ISBN 0-00-616573-7, Paperback
- 2004, USA, Signet ISBN 0-451-21341-6, 3 August 2004, Paperback

This is Bernard Cornwell's third novel and one of the author's personal favourites. This battle is where Cornwell thought he might begin his "series of tales about the adventures of a British rifleman in the Napoleonic Wars" before realising he would need to write a couple of novels to warm-up for it first.
