= Sharpe's Tiger =

Book by Bernard Cornwell

- First edition cover
- Author: Bernard Cornwell
- Language: English
- Series: Richard Sharpe stories
- Genre: Historical novels
- Publisher: HarperCollins
- Publication date: 2 June 1997
- Publication place: United Kingdom
- Media type: Print (hardback and paperback) and audio-CD
- Pages: 400 (hardcover)); 352 (paperback)
- ISBN: 0-00-225010-1 (hardcover); ISBN 0-00-649035-2 (paperback)
- OCLC: 37750954
- Dewey Decimal: 823/.914 21
- LC Class: PR6053.O75 S56 1997
- Preceded by: None (chronological); Sharpe's Battle (publication)
- Followed by: Sharpe's Triumph

Sharpe's Tiger is the fifteenth (though first in chronological order) historical novel in the Richard Sharpe series by Bernard Cornwell and was first published in 1997. It acts as a prequel to the "original" Sharpe series, which begins in 1809, while Sharpe is a captain in the Peninsular War during the Talavera Campaign in Spain. In Tiger, Sharpe is a private in the 33rd Regiment of Foot, serving in southern India during the Siege of Seringapatam in 1799.

It is also the first of three novels (followed by Sharpe's Triumph and Sharpe's Fortress) chronicling Sharpe's army service in India. Two others (Sharpe's Trafalgar and Sharpe's Prey) take place before the Peninsular War.

== Plot summary ==
Richard Sharpe is a private in the 33rd Regiment of Foot in the British army. The British invade Mysore and advance on Tippoo Sultan's capital city of Seringapatam. Sharpe is contemplating desertion with his paramour, army widow Mary Bickerstaff, due to his sadistic company sergeant, Obadiah Hakeswill. Hakeswill lusts after Mary, so he provokes Sharpe into hitting him before witnesses, company commander Captain Morris and Ensign Hicks. Sharpe is court-martialled; Lieutenant William Lawford, who is supposed to act as his defender, is absent and Sharpe is given the virtual death sentence of 2,000 lashes. However, the regiment's commander, Colonel Arthur Wellesley (later the Duke of Wellington), reluctantly halts the punishment at 202 lashes. Lawford has volunteered for an extremely dangerous mission, but only if Sharpe accompanies him. Sharpe agrees to go along on the condition that he be made a sergeant if they are successful.

Cover of the UK paperback edition

Lawford and Sharpe pose as deserters to try to contact (and rescue if feasible) Colonel Hector McCandless, Lawford's uncle and chief of the British East India Company's intelligence service. Sharpe's flogging inadvertently makes their cover story more plausible. Sharpe quickly takes charge and brings Mary along, to protect her from Hakeswill and because she speaks several of the native languages. They are soon captured by scouts from the Tippoo's army and taken to Seringapatam, where they meet Colonel Gudin, a French military adviser to the Tippoo. During their interrogation, the Tippoo orders them to load muskets and tells them to shoot a British prisoner, Colonel McCandless; Sharpe pulls the trigger, having noticed that the "gunpowder" he has been given is fake. The musket does not fire. After covertly telling McCandless that he is a spy, McCandless tells him that the British must not attack the seemingly weakest portion of the city walls. (It is later revealed that the Tippoo has had an enormous land mine concealed there to blow up the British when they enter the trap.)

Lawford and Sharpe join Gudin's troops, while Mary is sent to work as a servant in the household of one of the Tippoo's generals, Appah Rao, a Hindu who, unknown to the Muslim Tippoo, had been contacted by McCandless, his former commander, about switching sides. Gudin tests the pair further, giving them rifled fowling guns (Sharpe's first exposure to a rifled weapon instead of a smoothbore musket) to fire at British scouts. Sharpe's shot is slightly high, but Lawford, to his dismay, ends up hitting his target.

As a further test, Sharpe helps defend a Mysore encampment under attack by the British. During the attack, Sharpe encounters Hakeswill and tries to kill him, but is stopped by Gudin, who wants prisoners. Back in Seringapatam, Hakeswill spots Lawford in the crowd. Sharpe is rewarded for his actions by the Tippoo and is allowed to visit Mary. He finds that she is attracted to one of Appah Rao's men, Kunwar Singh, news which Sharpe takes in good grace. Meanwhile, the Tippoo orders the prisoners executed by his personal bodyguard, the fearsome jettis, but spares Hakeswill when the sergeant betrays Lawford and Sharpe. The two are captured and Sharpe is tortured until Lawford reveals their mission. They are then imprisoned with McCandless and Hakeswill. During their imprisonment, McCandless has Lawford teach Sharpe to read and write.

After days of bombardment, the British finally breach the outer wall. With the assault imminent, Appah Rao orders Kunwar Singh to free McCandless, while the Tippoo orders Sharpe, Lawford and McCandless executed as a sacrifice to ensure his victory. Mary insists on coming with Singh and helps Sharpe escape. Sharpe, accompanied by Lawford, then sets the mine off prematurely. As a result, many of the Tippoo's best soldiers are killed or stunned, and the British enter the new breach in the inner wall. Rao abandons the Tippoo and withdraws his men. Sharpe returns to Hakeswill and throws him to the Tippoo's tigers, though they inexplicably ignore him. Sharpe then encounters the Tippoo, who is trying to flee the city, kills him and loots his corpse.

The British capture the city and restore the Hindu rajah to the throne as a British puppet ruler. Sharpe carefully takes no credit for killing Tippoo to keep (and conceal) the many jewels he looted.

== Characters ==
- Richard Sharpe – the protagonist; private in the British Army's 33rd Regiment in India
- William Lawford – Sharpe's lieutenant who aids him in freeing Colonel McCandless
- Mary Bickerstaff – a half-English, half-Indian army widow, who becomes Sharpe's lover
- General George Harris – commander of the British forces in India against the Tippoo of Mysore
- Major-General David Baird – a former prisoner within Seringapatam now itching for revenge
- Colonel Arthur Wellesley – later 1st Duke of Wellington, the officer who saves Sharpe from his virtual execution at the hands of Hakeswill
- Colonel Hector McCandless – Scottish intelligence officer for the British East India Company, held captive by the Tippoo Sultan in the dungeons of Seringapatam
- The Tippoo ( Tipu Sultan ) – the Muslim ruler of Seringapatam
- Colonel Jean Gudin – a French adviser to the Tippoo
- Sergeant Obadiah Hakeswill – a sadistic, half-mad enemy of Sharpe's who believes he cannot be killed
- Brevet Lieutenant Fitzgerald – murdered by Hakeswill during a battle outside Seringapatam
- Ensign Hicks – a junior officer in the Light Company
- Captain Morris – the commanding officer of the 33rd Light Company
- Major Shee – the commanding officer of the 33rd Regiment
- Colonel Gent – the officer in charge of engineering the breach
- General Appah Rao – a Hindu officer in the Tippoo's army who once served under McCandless

== Publication history ==
- 1997, UK, HarperCollins ISBN 0-00-225010-1, Pub date 2 June 1997, hardback
- 1997, UK, HarperCollins ISBN 0-00-105335-3, Pub date 16 June 1997, audio cassette
- 1997, USA, HarperCollins Publishers ISBN 0-06-101269-6, Pub date ? October 1997, hardback
- 1997, UK, HarperCollins ISBN 0-00-225011-X, Pub date 3 November 1997, paperback
- 1998, UK, HarperCollins ISBN 0-00-649035-2, Pub date 1 June 1998, paperback
- 1999, USA, Chivers Press ISBN 0-7540-1242-5, Pub date 1 March 1999, hardback
- 2001, USA, Rebound by Sagebrush ISBN 0-613-37043-0, Pub date ? October 2001, hardback (library)
- 2002, USA, Chivers Audio Books ISBN 0-7540-5481-0, Pub date 16 June 1997, audio CD (unabridged William Gaminara narrator)
- 2005, UK, HarperCollins ISBN 0-00-721814-1, Pub date 15 June 2005, audio cassette (Sean Bean narrator)
- 2006, UK, HarperCollins ISBN 0-00-723504-6, Pub date 18 April 2006, paperback
