= Sharpe's Honour =

Book by Bernard Cornwell

- First edition
- Author: Bernard Cornwell
- Language: English
- Series: Richard Sharpe stories
- Genre: Historical novels
- Publisher: Collins
- Publication date: January 1985
- Publication place: United Kingdom
- Media type: Print (Hardcover and Paperback) and audio-CD
- Pages: 320 pp (hardcover edition)); 375 pp (paperback edition)
- ISBN: 0-00-221426-1 (hardcover edition); ISBN 0-00-617198-2 (paperback edition)
- OCLC: 12585347
- Preceded by: Sharpe's Enemy
- Followed by: Sharpe's Regiment

Sharpe's Honour is the sixteenth historical novel in the Richard Sharpe series by Bernard Cornwell, first published in 1985. In the Vitoria Campaign of the Peninsula War in 1813, Sharpe is framed for murder. He must find a way to clear his name to preserve the fragile alliance between Britain and Spain during the Napoleonic Wars.

== Plot summary ==
Major Pierre Ducos plots to broker a peace between France and Spain, offering to restore King Ferdinand VII to the Spanish throne in exchange for the Spanish signing a peace treaty and breaking their alliance with Britain. He offers the Spanish priest and Inquisitor Father Hacha and his brother, the brutal Partisan leader "El Matarife" ("The Slaughterman"), a huge sum of money for their assistance.

He then has his agent, the extraordinarily beautiful Marquesa de Casares el Grande y Melida Sabada (born Helene Leroux), to write a letter to her husband claiming Sharpe tried to rape her. Guided by Father Hacha, the Marques, a Spanish nobleman of very high rank, challenges Sharpe to a duel. Sharpe accepts, mistakenly thinking it is due to his having slept with Helene (as have many others). Just after Sharpe disarms his opponent, Sharpe's commanding officer, Lieutenant Colonel Leroy, shows up and ends the sword fight, thereby saving Sharpe's career, as Wellington has forbidden dueling. That night, the Marques is murdered by El Matarife. Sharpe is charged with the crime, found guilty by court-martial and sentenced to death. Wellington cannot intervene, fearing for the fragile British-Spanish alliance. However, his friend, Major Michael Hogan, arranges for another condemned man to impersonate Sharpe and be hanged in his place (in exchange for a younger brother's life), sending Sharpe to search for Helene to find out what is going on.

Meanwhile, Ducos betrays Helene. Instead of releasing her six wagons of valuables, he has Father Hacha and El Matarife kidnap her and take her to a nunnery; a stipulation of her late husband's will states that, if she becomes a nun, her entire enormous inheritance will go to the Church via Hacha. Sharpe tracks her down and frees her. However, he is captured by General Verigny, a French cavalry officer and Helene's latest lover, who has also come to her rescue. Sharpe refuses to give his parole to not try to escape. Ducos brutally interrogates him. Sharpe escapes, but is quickly recaptured by Verigny. Helene reveals Ducos' plot, then proposes Sharpe give his parole, whereupon she and Verigny will allow him to escape. Sharpe delays giving his answer, then escapes when a carelessly discarded cigar blows up a pile of ammunition, causing extensive damage and many deaths in Burgos.

At the Battle of Vitoria, Sharpe's old battalion, the South Essex, is left leaderless when Leroy is killed leading an assault. Sharpe finds and rallies his men, playing a pivotal part in Wellington's subsequent victory. When the French panic and flee, Harper and many others, soldiers and civilians alike, loot the abandoned gold and valuables, while Sharpe searches for Helene. They spot El Matarife, who has captured Helene in the chaos of the French retreat. Sharpe goads El Matarife into a duel. After defeating him, Sharpe forces him to confess to the Marques' murder before killing him. Sharpe and Harper then beat Hacha until he agrees to clear Sharpe's name. Helene charms Wellington into allowing her to leave for France with her wagons.

== Television adaptation ==
The novel was adapted as the last episode of the second season of the Sharpe television series, guest starring Alice Krige as La Marquesa, Nickolas Grace as Father Hacha and Matthew Scurfield as El Matarife. It retained the same basic plot as the novel but had a number of differences: It is written as Sharpe's first meeting with La Marquesa (since her earlier appearance, Sharpe's Sword, was not adapted until later), Harper accompanies Sharpe on his mission to find her (effectively taking the place of a partisan boy named Angel from the book), Hogan and Leroy are omitted and replaced with Nairn, Hacha is killed by Ducos for his failure whereas in the book he survives, and El Matarife is shot by Major Mendoza as he prepares to stab Sharpe in the back rather than having his throat slit by Sharpe. It also added an extra scene at the beginning where Ducos outlines his plans to Napoleon (played by Ron Cook).

== Publication history ==
Sharpe's Honour was the sixth book in the Sharpe series written by Cornwell by order of year of publication. After the addition of many more novels to the successful series it resides about two thirds of the way through the series and Sharpe's military career.
