= Sharpe's Enemy =

1984 historical novel by Bernard Cornwell

- First edition
- Author: Bernard Cornwell
- Language: English
- Series: Richard Sharpe stories
- Genre: Historical novels
- Publisher: Collins
- Publication date: January 1984
- Publication place: United Kingdom
- Media type: Print (hardcover and paperback) and audio-CD
- Pages: 352
- ISBN: 0-00-221424-5
- OCLC: 15428849
- Dewey Decimal: 823/.914 19
- LC Class: PR6053.O75 S52 1987
- Preceded by: Sharpe's Skirmish (chronological); Sharpe's Sword (publication)
- Followed by: Sharpe's Honour

Sharpe's Enemy: Richard Sharpe and the Defence of Portugal, Christmas 1812 is the fifteenth historical novel in the Richard Sharpe series by Bernard Cornwell, first published in 1984. The story is set in 1812 during the Napoleonic Wars.

== Plot summary ==
In the winter of 1812, a band of deserters from all the armies of the Peninsular War—French, British, Spanish and Portuguese—descends on the isolated hamlet of Adrados, on the Spanish-Portuguese border, led by Pot-au-Feu (Sergeant Deron, formerly Marshal Soult's chef). They slaughter most of the residents, sparing some of the women for later abuse, as well as a group on pilgrimage to a convent in the village, including Lady Farthingdale and Madame Dubreton, the English wife of a French colonel of cavalry.

Major General Nairn sends Richard Sharpe, recently promoted to the rank of major by the Prince Regent, who had followed his exploits with admiration, to deliver the ransom demanded for Lady Farthingdale. Upon reaching Adrados, Sharpe and Sergeant Patrick Harper encounter French Colonel Dubreton and his sergeant on a similar mission, to free Dubreton's wife. When they meet with "Maréchal" (Marshal) Pot-au-Feu, Sharpe is appalled to discover that Obadiah Hakeswill, his longtime bitter enemy (beginning from Sharpe's Tiger), is Pot-au-Feu's "colonel". They deliver the ransom, but Hakeswill informs them that the money only safeguards the women's virtue, and that they must continue making payments. When Madame Dubreton is presented to show she is unharmed, she and her husband are careful to conceal their relationship. Sharpe notes that Adrados is extremely defensible, with a castle, a watchtower and a convent. Madame Dubreton gives Sharpe a clue that she is being held in the convent.

Sharpe proposes to take the Light Company and two companies of the 60th American Rifles to make a sneak attack on the watchtower and the convent to free and protect the ladies until Colonel Kinney and his 113th Fusilier Regiment arrive to capture or kill the deserters. Sharpe chooses Christmas Eve for the attack, as the gang will be drunk. Nairn foists Captain Gilliland and his unwanted troop of "Rocket Cavalry" onto Sharpe to prove how useless they are. The Prince Regent thinks rocket artillery is a marvelous idea and wants it field tested; Sharpe finds the rockets to be wildly inaccurate.

Sharpe captures the convent and frees the women. Pot-au-Feu is taken prisoner, but Hakeswill gets away. Arriving with the fusiliers, aged Colonel Sir Augustus Farthingdale is reunited with his beloved young "wife". "Lady Farthingdale" is actually Josefina Lacosta, a high-class courtesan with whom Sharpe is intimately acquainted; she plays Farthingale's wife for a sizable stipend.

Shortly afterward, Dubreton arrives with his own, much larger force. Dubreton repays Sharpe for saving his wife by handing over Hakeswill. He then proposes a Christmas truce and invites Sharpe and the other British officers to dinner. There Sharpe first encounters Major Ducos, a French spy of great influence who will repeatedly trouble Sharpe in the future. The French demand that the British leave by nine o'clock the next morning. Farthingdale readily agrees, but Sharpe has misgivings. His Spanish partisan wife Teresa Moreno arrives and confirms his suspicions; she tells him that a sizable French force is advancing on the village, which turns out to be a diversionary invasion of northern Portugal (to draw enemy forces away from the real point of attack). He sends Teresa to deliver the news to Nairn.

Sharpe decides to make a stand, since if the French can get through the mountain pass, they can advance in too many directions for the British to counter effectively. He blackmails Lord Farthingdale into leaving (by threatening to reveal who "Lady Farthingdale" really is), thus leaving Sharpe in command. He sets a trap for the French, using Gilliland's Congreve rockets (at very close range to overcome their inaccuracy) to stop the initial attack. The French launch another attack. British reinforcements arrive just in time to save Sharpe's greatly outnumbered men.

Hakeswill escapes during the last hours of the fighting, and encounters and kills Teresa. He tries to desert to the French, but Dubreton returns him to Sharpe. After a court martial, Hakeswill is shot by a firing squad. He survives, but the grief-stricken Sharpe administers the coup de grace himself with his rifle.

== Characters ==
- Richard Sharpe: Brevet major in the British Army
- Patrick Harper: Sharpe's loyal Irish sergeant and friend
- Teresa Moreno: Sharpe's Spanish partisan wife, mother of his daughter Antonía
- Josefina La Costa: Sharpe's former lover, now attached to Sir Augustus Farthingdale and masquerading as his wife
- Major General Nairn: Sharpe's superior, giving orders while Lord Wellington is away in Lisbon
- Pot-au-Feu: Sergeant Deron, who appears in Sharpe's Havoc, and is the leader of the renegade band of deserters
- Obadiah Hakeswill: Sharpe's old enemy and former sergeant in the South Essex, now Colonel in the renegade deserter army
- Michel Dubreton: French chef de battalion, married to the English-born Madame Lucy Dubreton
- Major Pierre Ducos: Major, head of French military intelligence in Spain
- William Frederickson: Captain in the 60th Royal Americans, his face disfigured by a musket shot
- Harry Price: Lieutenant in the South Essex Light Company
- Captain Gilliand: Commander of the Congreve Rocket Troop
- Captain Cross: Captain in the 60th Royal Americans, junior to Captain Frederickson
- Colonel Kinney: Commander of the 113th Welsh Fusiliers, Sharpe's superior detachment commander

== References to other works ==
- Josefina LaCosta is Sharpe's love interest in Sharpe's Eagle. She is also in Sharpe's Gold, where she sets up house in Lisbon entertaining wealthy allied officers. Colonel Sir Augustus Farthingdale has her masquerade as his wife for lavish payments.
- Cornwell describes Adrados as the Gateway of God where outnumbered Spanish knights defeated Moors during the Wars of Spain.
- Madame Dubreton uses a line from the poem "Eloisa to Abelard" by Alexander Pope to indicate where the hostages are being kept. She said "withering in my bloom, lost in [a convent's] solitary gloom."

== Television adaptation ==
The novel was adapted for the second season of the Sharpe television series. It guest starred Jeremy Child as Sir Augustus, Helena Michell as Sarah Dubreton and Tony Haygarth as Pot-au-Feu. The adaptation kept the basic plot of the novel but many details were changed, notably the character of Josefina was not reused and was replaced with a new character, Isabella (played by Elizabeth Hurley), the wife of Sir Augustus and an old flame of Sharpe, with whom he has a sexual encounter while rescuing her. (In the novels, Isabella is the name of Harper's wife; the television adaptation instead gives him a girlfriend named Ramona.) Teresa is introduced earlier near the beginning of the adaptation, as is Ducos who accompanies Dubreton to his first meeting with Hakeswill. Sharpe is not promoted to major until midway through the adaptation prior to his return to the convent, Teresa is killed earlier when Hakeswill escapes after the convent's capture and the final battle with the French is significantly downgraded, being reduced to a single repulsed charge. The task of finishing Hakeswill's execution is given to an anonymous officer, with Sharpe merely watching from a distance.
