= Sharpe's Escape =

2004 historical novel by Bernard Cornwell

- First edition cover
- Author: Bernard Cornwell
- Language: English
- Series: Richard Sharpe stories
- Genre: Historical novels
- Publisher: HarperCollins
- Publication date: 1 June 2004
- Publication place: United Kingdom
- Media type: Print (Hardcover and Paperback) and audio-CD
- Pages: 351 (hardcover edition); 384 (paperback edition)
- ISBN: 0-00-712013-3 (hardcover edition); ISBN 0-00-712014-1 (paperback edition)
- OCLC: 55624786
- Preceded by: Sharpe's Gold (chronological); Sharpe's Havoc (publication)
- Followed by: Sharpe's Fury

Sharpe's Escape is the twenty-third (tenth in chronological order) historical novel in the Richard Sharpe series by Bernard Cornwell, published in 2004. Sharpe is embroiled in the British retreat through Portugal in 1810 from the defence of the ridge at Bussaco to the Lines of Torres Vedras, where the French offensive is successfully halted.

== Plot summary ==
=== Part One: Bussaco ===
Captain Richard Sharpe and his riflemen rejoin the South Essex Regiment during Wellington's retreat in Portugal. Sharpe is in a foul mood because Lieutenant Cornelius Slingsby has been foisted on him by the South Essex's commander, Colonel William Lawford, at the insistence of Lawford's wife in England (Slingsby's sister-in-law) to advance the latter's career. Sharpe believes Lawford is seeking to ease him out and replace him with Slingsby as commander of the South Essex's Light Company.

Sharpe discovers a Portuguese Army major, Ferreira, and his criminal brother, nicknamed "Ferragus" due to his size and strength, trying to sell a stockpile of flour to the advancing French, in contravention of Wellington's strict policy of stripping the land bare of any resources the enemy could use. Over the major's objections, Sharpe subdues Ferragus and has the flour scattered on the ground. Sharpe's friend, Major Hogan, later gives him a light reprimand, explaining that Ferreira is an intelligence officer for the Portuguese Army with contacts among the Portuguese sympathisers in the French Army; Ferreira claims he was giving them the flour to gain the confidence of the French. Later, Sharpe is ambushed by Ferragus and his men and savagely beaten, and saved from death only by the chance appearance of some provosts.

On the morning of the Battle of Bussaco, Lawford uses Sharpe's injuries as an excuse to temporarily relieve him of command of the Light Company and place Slingsby in charge. The French launch a frontal attack up the steep ridge, only to be decimated by the Allies' cannon and musket fire. Because of Slingsby's incompetence, the Light Company is separated from the rest of the regiment and almost overrun by the retreating survivors of one of the destroyed French columns. Sharpe takes charge and narrowly averts disaster. Afterward, Slingsby complains to Lawford, who orders Sharpe to apologise for his harsh language. Sharpe refuses, and Lawford assigns him to replace the regimental quartermaster, confirming Slingsby as captain of the Light Company.

=== Part Two: Coimbra ===
Sharpe is sent ahead to Coimbra to prepare billets for the regiment. His friend, Portuguese Captain Jorge Vicente (whom he met in Sharpe's Havoc), goes along. Sharpe goes to Major Ferreira's house and finds it abandoned, except for his children's English governess, Sarah Fry, naked and locked in a room. Ferragus and his men had been guarding his brother's house, and Ferragus was planning to rape Sarah, but had to leave ahead of the arriving British soldiers. Ferragus, still seeking revenge against Sharpe, lures him, Sergeant Patrick Harper, and Vicente (along with Sarah) to a warehouse where he has hidden an enormous stockpile of food and other supplies for sale to the desperate French Army. Ferragus traps the four in the stone cellar, planning to return and finish them off after the British and Portuguese forces depart.

Ferragus is sure the cellar is escape-proof, but Sharpe and Harper pry up the floor and break into a sewer, through which they escape. By the time they emerge, the British Army has left and the French are raping, pillaging and murdering the city residents. Sharpe and Harper save a young Portuguese woman, Joana, from being raped by three French soldiers. Before fleeing the city, Sharpe manages to set fire to the warehouse, destroying much of the supplies. Ferragus and his brother have already been paid by the French for their stores, but flee the city when they see the warehouse burning, realising they will be blamed for its loss.

=== Part Three: The Lines of Torres Vedras ===
Marshal Masséna and his army march south from Coimbra, but are stopped by the immense Lines of Torres Vedras, two lines of fortifications constructed by Wellington. The fortifications appear impregnable, but Masséna, knowing that his army has no supplies for a long retreat, orders a probe into what appears to be an unfortified valley.

The valley is defended by the South Essex and a Portuguese unit. Meanwhile, Lawford has posted the South Essex's Light Company as a picquet to give Slingsby another opportunity to distinguish himself. Instead, Slingsby disobeys Lawford's order to remain sober and is completely drunk when the French attack, forcing his junior lieutenant to take command. Ferreira and Ferragus arrive, claiming to have important information for Wellington, and Ferreira orders the lieutenant to accept a French surrender offer, so that he and Ferragus can slip away. However, Sharpe and his party show up. They quickly subdue Ferreira and Ferragus, and Sharpe takes charge. The French attack, and in the confusion Ferragus breaks free and attacks Sharpe. During the fight, Sharpe backs Ferragus up against a window, where he is killed by French musket fire from outside.

Under Sharpe's leadership, the Light Company successfully drives off the French, then employs a ruse thought up by Sharpe to drive off a second French force that is threatening the South Essex, brought up by Lawford to try to rescue the Light Company. Sharpe orders Ferreira be sent to Wellington, then asks Lawford if he should resume his duties as quartermaster. Lawford, having had enough of Slingsby's drunkenness and incompetence, irritably tells Sharpe to stop being "tedious."

== Characters ==
- Captain Richard Sharpe - OC Light Company, South Essex Regiment
- Sergeant Patrick Harper - sergeant in the British army, close friend and ally to Richard Sharpe
- Lieutenant Cornelius Slingsby - Sharpe's second-in-command
- Major Pedro Ferreira - Portuguese intelligence officer
- Sarah Fry - stranded English governess
- Luis Ferreira, aka "Ferragus" - Portuguese criminal, former slave trader and brother of Major Ferreira
- Major Michael Hogan - engineer for the British army and intelligence officer
- Colonel William Lawford - Sharpe's commanding officer
- Captain Jorge Vicente - Portuguese army, Sharpe's friend
- Joana Jacinto - Portuguese girl, saved from the sack of Coimbra by Sharpe and Harper
- Rifleman Matthew Dodd - separated from the company during a battle; a homage to C. S. Forester's Death to the French, also known as Rifleman Dodd

=== Historical ===
- Lieutenant General Viscount Wellington
- General Robert "Black Bob" Craufurd
- General Sir Thomas Picton
- Marshals of France André Masséna and Michel Ney
- Generals Jean-Andoche Junot, Jean Reynier and Jacques Thomas Sarrut
