= Sharpe's Regiment =

1986 historical novel by Bernard Cornwell

- First edition
- Author: Bernard Cornwell
- Language: English
- Series: Richard Sharpe
- Genre: Historical novel
- Publisher: Collins
- Publication date: 20 January 1986
- Publication place: United Kingdom
- Media type: Print (hardback and paperback)
- Pages: 416 (first edition, hardback)
- ISBN: 0-00-221430-X (first edition, hardback)
- OCLC: 12585653
- Preceded by: Sharpe's Honour
- Followed by: Sharpe's Storm (chronological); Sharpe's Siege (publication)

Sharpe's Regiment is the seventeenth historical novel in the Richard Sharpe series by Bernard Cornwell, first published in 1986. The story is set in England as Sharpe tries to find out why replacements have not been sent to the dangerously depleted South Essex Regiment in Spain during the Napoleonic Wars.

== Plot summary ==
The 1st Battalion, South Essex Regiment, is desperately short of men. The 2nd Battalion, stationed back in England, is supposed to train and send recruits, but Lord Simon Fenner, the secretary of state for war, informs Major General Nairn that no reinforcements will be sent and recommends the unit be broken up. While there is a lull in the campaign as Wellington prepares to invade France, Nairn sends Sharpe back to England to investigate. Sharpe goes to the 2nd Battalion's headquarters with Regimental Sergeant Harper, Captain d'Alembord and Lieutenant Price and finds only a skeleton staff. However, an old comrade-in-arms stationed there tells him that he saw a South Essex recruiting party with new enlistees in tow, though none of them have arrived for training.

Sharpe is then summoned by the Prince Regent, where he meets Lord Fenner. Fenner has his mistress, Dowager Countess Lady Anne Comoynes, meet Sharpe to find out what he knows. She seduces Sharpe for her own purposes and warns him against asking questions. Two men are sent to assassinate Sharpe, but Sharpe kills them after visiting an old friend, Maggie Joyce. One of the dead men is wearing the (concealed) uniform of a sergeant of the South Essex.

Sharpe and Harper then enlist in the South Essex Regiment under assumed names in order to find the 2nd Battalion. They and other recruits are taken to a secret, brutal training camp in Foulness Island, run by the 2nd Battalion's commanding officer, Lieutenant-Colonel Bartholomew Girdwood. Sharpe learns that Fenner, Sir Henry Simmerson (the regiment's disgraced founder and Sharpe's old enemy from Sharpe's Eagle) and Girdwood are secretly selling trained recruits to other regiments and profiting enormously.

When Harper objects to a deserter being killed in cold blood, Girdwood—who hates the Irish—decides to make an example of him; Harper is set loose in the surrounding marsh late at night, to be hunted down and killed. Sharpe rescues him and, with help from Simmerson's niece Jane Gibbons, whom Simmerson intends to marry off to Girdwood, they escape to London. Sharpe encounters his former commander and friend turned politician, Sir William Lawford, but Lawford tries to do a deal with Fenner, offering to cover up the matter in exchange for Fenner's patronage and command of a battalion in the Americas for Sharpe. Lady Anne, who has been forced to prostitute herself to Fenner to pay off her late husband's enormous debts, warns Sharpe about this. Sharpe, Harper, Price, and D'Alembord illegally take charge of the training camp from Girdwood, but they cannot find evidence of the crimes. Jane tries but fails to obtain two incriminating ledgers.

In desperation, Sharpe takes the 2nd Battalion to London and presents them to the Prince Regent at Hyde Park during a celebration, proving they exist. Fenner brings Sharpe to a meeting where Sharpe tries to present his claims. Fenner, however, is too crafty, and Sharpe is in great trouble. Then Lady Anne arrives, having found the ledgers and rescued them from being burnt. She blackmails Fenner into cancelling her debts and fulfilling Sharpe's demands: The 2nd Battalion would be reformed, the South Essex now renamed "The Prince of Wales Own Volunteers", and Sharpe is allowed to take the trained soldiers, including Girdwood, back to Spain with him. Fenner resigns and Sharpe marries Jane because he loves her and to protect her from her infuriated uncle.

At the Battle of the Nivelle, Girdwood, the regiment's nominal commander, suffers a complete nervous breakdown after his first experience of battle, leaving Sharpe in command until a new colonel is appointed.

== Television adaptation ==
The novel was adapted as the opening episode of the fourth season of the Sharpe television series. The adaptation introduced Abigail Cruttenden as Jane and Caroline Langrishe as Lady Anne and guest starred Nicholas Farrell as Fenner, Mark Lambert as Girdwood, Julian Fellowes as the Prince Regent and Julie T. Wallace as Maggie Joyce. It also introduced James Laurenson as an original character, Major-General Ross, who took on the role given to Nairn in the book. The adaptation was faithful to the novel but omitted D'Alembord and Price along with various scenes, including much of the aftermath of the Hyde Park sequence.
