= Sharpe's Trafalgar =

Book by Bernard Cornwell

- First edition cover
- Author: Bernard Cornwell
- Language: English
- Series: Richard Sharpe stories
- Genre: Historical novels
- Publisher: HarperCollins
- Publication date: 3 April 2000
- Publication place: United Kingdom
- Media type: Print (hardcover and paperback) and audio-CD
- Pages: 288 (hardcover); 384 (paperback)
- ISBN: 0-00-225874-9 (hardcover); ISBN 0-00-651309-3 (paperback)
- OCLC: 42952997
- Preceded by: Sharpe's Fortress
- Followed by: Sharpe's Prey

Sharpe's Trafalgar is the fourth historical novel in the Richard Sharpe series by Bernard Cornwell, first published in 2000. It is the first of the novels in the wars against Napoleon, putting the army ensign at the Battle of Trafalgar in 1805.

== Plot summary ==
In 1805, Richard Sharpe is to sail to England from India aboard the East Indiaman Calliope to join the 95th Rifles. He is swindled after purchasing supplies for the voyage. After finding out, he gets not only his money back, but also that of fellow victim Royal Navy Captain Joel Chase, saving Chase from the great financial embarrassment of being unable to pay a gambling debt the next day. Chase wants to show his gratitude, but is under orders to destroy a French 74 named the Revenant that is raiding the Indian Ocean.

The Calliope's passengers include the lovely, young Lady Grace Hale and her much older husband, Lord William Hale. Sharpe is also astonished to find aboard Anthony Pohlmann, a renegade and former Maratha warlord (defeated by Arthur Wellesley in Sharpe's Triumph), traveling under a false identity—Baron von Dornberg—but sees no reason to denounce his former foe.

Peculiar Cromwell, captain of the Calliope, spots the jewels (looted from an Indian ruler) Sharpe has sewn into his clothing and insists that Sharpe leave them with him for safekeeping, to avoid tempting his crew.

Sharpe becomes obsessed with Lady Grace, but his attempts to become better acquainted are unsuccessful, at first. However, she later questions him in private about "Dornberg"; while Cromwell and Dornberg deny knowing each other, she has observed them conversing frequently. Sharpe protects Dornberg as best he can. When Lady Grace gets up to leave, a sudden movement of the ship causes her to stumble, and Sharpe ends up with his arm around her waist. They eventually become secret lovers.

Cromwell leaves the safety of a slow convoy with his fast ship. Lady Grace becomes worried that they are sailing near French-held Mauritius. She ends up spending the first of several nights with Sharpe. Malachi Braithwaite, Lord Hale's secretary, finds out and is angered, as he is attracted to Lady Grace too. Sharpe threatens to kill him if he tells anyone.

The Revenant appears. Before the Calliope is captured, Sharpe hurries to retrieve his jewels from Cromwell's safe, but they are not there. Sharpe suspects both Cromwell and Pohlmann aided the French; both men board the Revenant. A prize crew starts sailing the Calliope to Mauritius. Later, the lieutenant in charge tries to rape Lady Grace; Sharpe goes to her rescue and kills the Frenchman in a swordfight. The other Frenchmen understand and do not punish Sharpe. One day, another ship is spotted. Sharpe manages to cut the tiller ropes controlling the rudder, slowing the Calliope. This enables Captain Chase's Pucelle to capture the Calliope.

Chase invites Sharpe to transfer to his ship; Sharpe is reluctant to accept, until he discovers that Lord Hale has insisted on switching to the faster Pucelle, along with his wife. Chase confides to Sharpe that a French agent, probably Dornberg's "servant", negotiated a secret treaty with the ablest of the Indian Maratha leaders. If it is delivered to Paris, the French might send arms to the Marathas to start a new war against the British.

Chase does everything in his power to overtake the Revenant. Sharpe trains with the marines for shipboard fighting and is introduced to a seven-barreled Nock gun (a weapon which future friend Patrick Harper will favour). A ship is spotted. The Pucelle gives chase, but loses it.

Meanwhile, Lady Grace tells Sharpe that Braithwaite is trying to blackmail her. He ambushes the man. Braithwaite produces a pistol and tries to negotiate, claiming he left a letter describing Sharpe's affair, but Sharpe kills him. When the corpse is found, people assume Braithwaite had a fatal fall.

The Revenant is spotted, and a long chase commences. One night, Lady Grace hesitantly informs Sharpe that she is pregnant with his child, unsure of his reaction. He is delighted.

Then the combined French and Spanish fleets sortie, with Admiral Horatio Nelson's fleet in pursuit. The Revenant joins the enemy fleet, while the Pucelle comes under Nelson's command. When Nelson summons Chase to a meeting, Chase brings Sharpe along and introduces him to his friend the admiral.

When the British attack the enemy fleet, commencing the Battle of Trafalgar, Chase points out the Revenant to Sharpe. Chase sends the Hales to safety, while Sharpe joins the marines. The Pucelle goes to the aid of Nelson's ship, attacking the Neptune, and is attacked in turn by the Revenant. The Revenant is eventually captured. Pohlmann is killed by a cannonball. Sharpe finds the French agent and tosses him into the sea; the man cannot swim. Cromwell survives; Sharpe retrieves his jewels before reluctantly handing him over to Chase.

When Sharpe goes to find Lady Grace, he discovers that she has killed her husband in self-defense. While the battle was raging, Lord Hale had confronted his wife over Braithwaite's letter. He eventually told her that he would kill her and make it appear a suicide. He also promised to sabotage Sharpe's life secretly. Sharpe has a friend take his body up on deck so it will seem that he was killed in the fighting. Upset at first, Lady Grace realises she is now free to do as she pleases.

== Characters in Sharpe's Trafalgar ==
- Richard Sharpe
- Lady Grace Hale, wife of Lord Hale
- Lord William Hale, British diplomat
- Horatio Nelson, admiral of the British fleet
- The "Baron von Dornberg", actually Anthony Pohlmann
- Malachi Braithwaite, Lord Hale's secretary
- Joel Chase, captain of the Pucelle
- Peculiar Cromwell, captain of the Calliope
- Louis Montmorin, captain of the Revenant
- Clouter, gun captain of one of the' 32-pounder carronades

== Real people who were at both battles ==
- In his historical note, Cornwell comments that, aside from Sharpe, a fictional character, he is aware of only one person who was present at both Trafalgar and Waterloo: Miguel de Álava, originally a marine in the Spanish Navy at the time when Spain was allied with France, later a general and close personal friend of the Duke of Wellington, and Spanish ambassador to the Netherlands.
- In his later nonfiction work, Waterloo: The History of Four Days, Three Armies, and Three Battles, Cornwell amends this statement by adding that at least one unit of Napoleon's Army of the North that fought at Waterloo was formed from former French marines who had served at Trafalgar.
- General Antoine Drouot is also supposed to have been at both battles.

== Release details ==
- 2000, UK, HarperCollins ISBN 0-00-225874-9, published 3 April 2000, hardcover (first edition)
- 2000, UK, HarperCollins ISBN 0-00-651309-3, published 6 November 2000, paperback
- 2000, UK, HarperCollins ISBN 0-00-105645-X, published 3 April 2000, audio book (cassette)
- 2000, UK, Chivers Audio Books ISBN 0-7540-5400-4, published December 2000?, audio book (CD)
