= Waterloo: The History of Four Days, Three Armies and Three Battles =

2014 nonfiction history book by Bernard Cornwell

- First Edition cover page, detail from "Closing the Gates at Hougoumont" (1815) by Robert Gibb.
- Author: Bernard Cornwell
- Subject: History/History of Great Britain/Napoleonic Wars/Military History/Waterloo Campaign
- Genre: non-fiction
- Publisher: William Collins/Harper Collins Publishers
- Publication date: 11 September 2014 (U.K.); 5 May 2015 (U.S.)
- Publication place: Great Britain
- ISBN: 978-0007539383 (hardcover, U.K.); ISBN 978-0062312051 (hardcover, U.S.); ISBN 978-0007539406 (paperback, U.K.); ISBN 978-0007580194 (paperback, U.S.)
- Dewey Decimal: 944.05 C821
- LC Class: DC242.C667 2014

Waterloo: The History of Four Days, Three Armies and Three Battles is a history book written by Bernard Cornwell, first published in Great Britain by William Collins on 11 September 2014, and by Harper Collins Publishers on 5 May 2015 in the United States. It is Cornwell's first work of nonfiction, after publishing more than forty novels in the historical fiction genre, including the popular Richard Sharpe series taking place during the Napoleonic Wars. The book recounts the Battle of Waterloo on 18 June 1815, including preceding events from the campaign of the same name and The Hundred Days.

According to the book's jacket, the book was commissioned to commemorate the Battle's 200th anniversary.

The book includes a number of full colour illustrations, including maps and colour portraits of the major figures involved, including Napoleon Bonaparte, the Duke of Wellington, Field Marshal Prince von Blucher, Marshals Ney, Soult and Grouchy.

The book should not be confused with Cornwell's novel Sharpe's Waterloo, originally published as Waterloo in 1990. That novel also narrates the battle, but largely from the perspective of Cornwell's fictional characters.

== Audiobook ==
Waterloo was released as an audiobook by Harper Audio on 5 May 2015. The Foreword, Preface, Aftermath and Afterword are read by Cornwell, and Chapters One through Twelve by Dugald Bruce Lockhart.
