= Sharpe's Fury =

2006 historical novel by Bernard Cornwell

- First edition cover
- Author: Bernard Cornwell
- Language: English
- Series: Richard Sharpe stories
- Genre: War, Historical novel,
- Publisher: HarperCollins
- Publication date: 28 August 2006
- Publication place: United Kingdom
- Media type: Print (Hardback)
- Pages: 416 pp (first edition, hardback)
- ISBN: 0-00-712015-X (first edition, hardback)
- OCLC: 71204734
- Dewey Decimal: 823/.914 22
- LC Class: PR6053.O75 S527 2006
- Preceded by: Sharpe's Escape
- Followed by: Sharpe's Battle (chronological); Sharpe's Assassin (publication)

Sharpe's Fury is the eleventh historical novel in the Richard Sharpe series by Bernard Cornwell, published in 2006. The story is set in 1811 during Wellington's campaign in the Iberian peninsula.

== Plot summary ==
In the spring of 1811, the Peninsular War appears to have been won by the French. Cádiz is the only major Spanish town still holding out. From their overwintering strongholds in Portugal, the British sally forth to the River Guadiana with a small force seeking to destroy a key bridge across the river. The mission is commanded by the young Brigadier General Moon, a man with no love for Sharpe. Sharpe and the men with him encounter French Colonel Henri Vandal, commander of the 8th Regiment of the Line. Sharpe succeeds in blowing up the bridge. Sharpe, Harper, Moon (with a broken leg) and some men of the 95th escape on a pontoon (part of the bridge) which takes them down stream. After the pontoon runs aground, they meet up with some Connaught Rangers, who help Sharpe keep the French at bay. After resting for a while, Sharpe tries to find a way to get back to the Anglo-Portuguese army. After walking for a while, they find a house and take shelter. Sharpe is able to find a boat. The marquesa who resides in the house is an afrancesada—a supporter of the French. Sharpe, realising she has probably alerted the enemy, gets the company to the boat and is able to set off but is pursued by the French. In a brief skirmish, a stray musket ball bits Sharpe in the head, seriously injuring him. His men manage to get him to Cádiz, which is besieged by a French army led by Marshal Victor.

In Cádiz, British ambassador Henry Wellesley, younger brother of the Duke of Wellington, seeks Sharpe's help. Wellesley fell in love with a beautiful woman named Caterina Blazquez. Unfortunately, she turns out to be a whore, and her pimp tries to blackmail Wellesley using Wellesley's love letters. Worse, virulently anti-British Catholic priest Father Salvador Montseny learns of this and murders the pimp to obtain the letters. British spymaster Lord Pumphrey assures Wellesley he can pay for the letters and that will be the end of the affair, but Sharpe believes otherwise. Sharpe is proved correct, but eventually manages to steal the letters (and make the acquaintance of Blazquez) with the assistance of Patrick Harper and his riflemen.

Then a joint Spanish-British army is transported by boat south of the city to attack Victor's forces from the rear and lift the siege. Because the Spanish provide more troops, timid Spanish General Lapeña is given command, rather than British General Thomas Graham. Lapeña squanders opportunity after opportunity, leading his men toward disaster and Victor's trap. Fortunately, Graham and the British, fighting desperately while the Spanish flee or do nothing, defeat the French in the Battle of Barrosa. Sergeant Masterson and Ensign Keough capture the 8th's Eagle, while Sharpe takes Colonel Vandal prisoner.

In the aftermath, Vandal complains to General Graham of ill treatment by Sharpe, even after he surrendered. But any inquiry is quashed when Brigadier Moon (who has become engaged to Caterina) vouches for Sharpe's conduct. Moon stays in Cádiz to recover with his bride-to-be, while Sharpe, Harper and his riflemen are finally able to board a ship to rejoin the rest of the army.

== Release details ==
- 2006, UK, HarperCollins ISBN 0-00-712015-X, Pub date 28 August 2006, hardback (First edition)
