= Sharpe (novel series) =

Series of historical fiction stories by Bernard Cornwell

Richard Sharpe
- Sharpe character
- Created by: Bernard Cornwell

In-universe information
- Nicknames: Dick, Sharpie
- Occupation: Thief; Soldier; Farmer
- Spouses: Teresa Moreno; Jane Gibbons; Lucille Castineau
- Children: Antonia (with Teresa Moreno); Patrick-Henri Lassan (with Lucille Castineau); Dominique Lassan (with Lucille Castineau)
- Nationality: English

Sharpe is a series of historical fiction stories by Bernard Cornwell centred on the character of English soldier Richard Sharpe. The stories formed the basis for an ITV television series featuring Sean Bean in the title role.

Cornwell's series comprises many novels and several short stories, and charts Sharpe's progress in the British Army during the Napoleonic Wars, though the novels were published in non-chronological order. He begins in Sharpe's Tiger as a private in the 33rd Regiment of Foot who is continually promoted, finally rising to lieutenant colonel in Sharpe's Waterloo. His military career ends with the final defeat of Napoleon, but he has more adventures as a civilian.

Sharpe is born to a prostitute in the rookeries of London. Orphaned at an early age, he grows up in poverty. He is eventually taken in by prostitute (and later bar owner) Maggie Joyce and becomes a thief. He has to flee the city after killing a man to protect Maggie.

Enlisting in the army, he is promoted to sergeant as a reward for completing a highly dangerous espionage mission in India. He is made an officer, an ensign, when he saves the life of his commanding officer, Arthur Wellesley (the future Duke of Wellington), during the Battle of Assaye. It is a mixed blessing, as he constantly has to fight class prejudice in an army where an officer's rank is often purchased without regard to qualification. Cornwell sees to it that he is improbably present at many important battles of the British Empire at the end of the 18th century and the beginning of the 19th, including the Battle of Waterloo.

Sharpe is described as "brilliant but wayward" in Sharpe's Sword, and he is portrayed by the author as a "loose cannon". He becomes a highly skilled and experienced leader of light troops. In contrast to the honourable Horatio Hornblower—the inspiration for the series—Sharpe is a rogue, an unabashed thief and murderer who has no qualms about killing a bitter enemy when the opportunity arises. However, he is protective of women in general and has a number of lovers over the course of his life.

He is six feet tall, with an angular, tanned face, long black hair, and blue eyes. He has a deep scar on his right cheek which pulls at his right eye, giving his face a mocking expression when relaxed; this disappears when he smiles, which is not too frequently. By the end of the series, he has had two wives and three children.

== Inspiration ==
Cornwell had enjoyed C. S. Forester's Horatio Hornblower novels, which depict a Royal Navy officer's career from midshipman to Admiral of the Fleet and retirement. When he could not find a similar series for the British Army, he decided to write it himself. As a further inducement, he had fallen in love with an American woman who, for various reasons, could not leave the United States, so he relocated. He could not get a green card or work permit, so he wrote the first Sharpe novel to make a living.

Struggling to come up with a name as distinctive as Horatio Hornblower, he used a placeholder based on the rugby union player Richard Sharp; eventually, he kept it, just adding an "e". The author had intended to write 11 novels, the same number as in the Hornblower series, ending with Sharpe's Waterloo, but later changed his mind and continued writing.

== Sean Bean ==
Sean Bean played Sharpe in the British television series Sharpe. Cornwell was so impressed with Bean's portrayal that he expanded Sharpe's backstory to have him growing up in Yorkshire to account for Bean's accent. The author also avoided further mention of Sharpe's black hair (Bean's hair being blond). Bean took over the part from British actor Paul McGann, who more closely resembled Cornwell's description, when the latter was injured playing football during filming of the first episode.

== Fictional biography ==
=== Early life ===
Richard Sharpe is born in London on 23 June 1777 (as Bernard Cornwell states in a Q&A on his website) to a prostitute residing in "Cat Lane" and possibly a French smuggler. When Sharpe is three, his mother is killed in the Gordon Riots.

With no known relatives to raise him, Sharpe is deposited in Jem Hocking's foundling home at Brewhouse Lane, Wapping, where he spends his days picking his assigned quota of oakum. He is malnourished and regularly beaten, resulting in his being undersized for his age. Because of this, he is eventually sold to a master chimney sweep to train as an apprentice at the relatively late age of 12. Fearing the high mortality rate among apprentice sweeps (who are forced to climb inside chimneys and remove soot by hand), Sharpe flees to the Rookery, a slum in St Giles, and is taken in by prostitute (and later bar owner) Maggie Joyce. He stays under Maggie's protection for three years, learning various forms of thieving. Maggie is his first lover.

After killing a gang leader during a fight over Maggie, he flees from London to Yorkshire at the age of fifteen. He works in a tavern in Sheffield. Within six months, Sharpe kills a second man, the landlord of the tavern where he is working, in a fight over a local girl.

To avoid arrest, Sharpe takes the "King's shilling", joining the 33rd Foot, as a result of the blandishments of recruiting sergeant Obadiah Hakeswill. The regiment is first sent to Flanders in 1794, where Sharpe fights in his first battle, at Boxtel. The next year, he and his regiment are posted to India, under the command of the British East India Company.

=== India ===
In 1799 Sergeant Hakeswill goads Sharpe into striking him, and Sharpe is sentenced to 2,000 lashes, effectively a death sentence. However, he is released after 200 by executive order (Sharpe's Tiger) at Lieutenant William Lawford's insistence so that he can accompany Lawford on a vital secret mission. They are sent to contact (rescue if possible) Lawford's uncle, Colonel Hector McCandless, the head of British East India Company intelligence. They join Tipu Sultan's army, posing as British deserters, but are later betrayed by Hakeswill (who has been captured) and imprisoned. Lawford teaches Sharpe to read and write whilst they languish in a dungeon with McCandless. Sharpe picks the lock of their cell and escapes during the siege of Seringapatam. He prematurely detonates a mine meant to devastate the British army when it breaches the city wall. The British take the city. He then kills the fleeing Tipu unobserved during the fighting and takes a fortune in jewels from the corpse. He is promoted to sergeant for his efforts.

Sharpe serves four uneventful years as a sergeant. In 1803 he is the sole survivor of a massacre of the garrison of a small fort carried out by a turncoat East India Company officer, William Dodd (Sharpe's Triumph). Because he can identify Dodd, Sharpe is taken along by McCandless on a mission to capture and punish the renegade, to discourage others from deserting. Their search takes them first to battles at Ahmednuggur and then Assaye.

At Assaye, the greatly outnumbered British force is commanded by Arthur Wellesley (the future Duke of Wellington). When Wellesley's orderly is killed, by chance Sharpe is the only one available to take his place, and so is at hand when Wellesley is unhorsed alone and amongst the enemy. Sharpe single-handedly saves the general's life, killing about half a dozen soldiers and holding the rest at bay until help arrives. Wellesley rewards him with a battlefield commission as an ensign, though Wellesley is certain it will not turn out well. Sharpe joins the 74th Regiment.

Sharpe receives a cold welcome from many of his fellow officers, who dislike him due to his low birth, and the common soldiers, who resent being commanded by someone from their own ranks, and he has great difficulty adjusting to his new status and role. In the end, the commander of the 74th pressures him to transfer to the newly formed 95th Rifles Regiment. Before leaving India, he takes part in the assault on Gawilghur, leading troops in action for the first time. Sharpe finds a way into the nearly impregnable fortress, ignoring the orders of his cowardly commanding officer. Once inside, he confronts and kills Dodd, at the cost of a scar on his right cheek (Sharpe's Fortress). (Cornwell apologised for sometimes forgetting which side of Sharpe's face is scarred; in Sharpe's Revenge, for example, it is on the left.)

=== Campaigns in Europe ===
While sailing in 1805 from India to England to take up his post in the 95th Rifles, he meets and falls in love with fellow passenger Lady Grace Hale, the wife of an ambitious and powerful politician, the much older Lord William Hale (Sharpe's Trafalgar). They have an affair. Then Sharpe is caught up in the Battle of Trafalgar, his first direct encounter with Napoleonic France as an infantry officer. During the sea battle, Lord Hale confronts his wife, having discovered her infidelity. She kills him in self-defence. Sharpe has the body taken on deck so that it will appear as if Lord Hale died in the fighting.

Grace sets up home with Sharpe at Shorncliffe, but dies giving birth to their child, who survives her by only a few hours. Sharpe's fortune (from selling Tipu Sultan's jewels) is seized by lawyers who believe it to be part of Grace's estate.

He falls into a deep depression, worsened by his bad relationship with his commanding officer, who relegates him to the role of quartermaster. He is left behind when the regiment is posted to the Baltic in 1807. Sharpe, unable to sell his commission (due to it not having been purchased), considers deserting.

He returns to Wapping and robs and kills Jem Hocking, the abusive master of the foundling home where Sharpe was raised. He fortuitously encounters General David Baird, a former colleague from India. Baird recruits him to protect John Lavisser, a Foreign Office agent being sent to secretly negotiate with the Danish Crown Prince to keep the Danish fleet out of French hands. Lavisser, acting in his own interests, tries but fails to have Sharpe killed. Sharpe goes into hiding in Copenhagen. He witnesses the British bombardment of the city and provides valuable assistance in the capture of the Danish fleet (Sharpe's Prey). Sharpe considers settling down there, having fallen in love with Astrid, the daughter of Ole Skovgaard, the chief spy for the British in Denmark. However, Skovgaard turns against the British because of their attack, and Astrid obeys his order to break up with Sharpe.

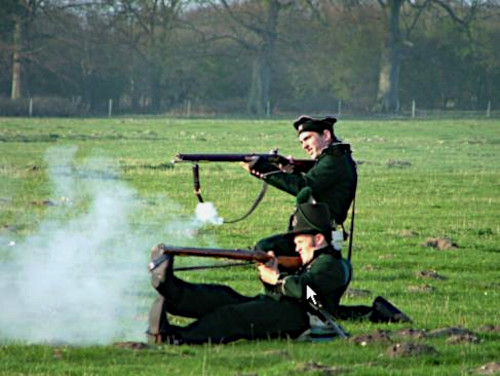
95th Rifles reenactors.

By early 1809 Sharpe is in Spain with the 95th Rifles, his men serving as the rearguard of the retreat to Corunna. When Captain Murray is mortally wounded, he leaves his heavy cavalry sword to Sharpe, giving him his signature weapon, used in all the subsequent books. Cut off from the main body of the army, he takes command of a handful of mutinous riflemen (including future best friend Patrick Harper), while protecting a small party of English missionaries. He encounters Spanish Major Blas Vivar and his partisans and reluctantly helps them temporarily seize control of the city of Santiago de Compostela so that Vivar can raise a sacred gonfalon to bolster the Spanish people's flagging morale (Sharpe's Rifles). Sharpe's surviving riflemen who begin the retreat to Corunna are:

†: dead

- Rfn Daniel Hagman (Sharpe's Rifles - Sharpe's Waterloo) †
- Rfn Hobbes (Sharpe's Revenge) †
- Rfn Harris (Sharpe's Prey - Sharpe's Christmas)
- Rfn Ben Perkins (Sharpe's Rifles - Sharpe's Christmas)
- Rfn Francis Cooper (Sharpe's Prey - Sharpe's Christmas)
- Rfn Parry Jenkins (Sharpe's Rifles - Sharpe's Sword)
- Rfn Green (Sharpe's Battle - Sharpe's Company)
- Rfn McDonald (Sharpe's Battle - Sharpe's Company)
- Rfn Smith (Sharpe's Battle - Sharpe's Company)
- Rfn Christopher Cresacre (Sharpe's Havoc - Sharpe's Company) †
- Rfn Jebediah Horrell (Sharpe's Eagle - Sharpe's Battle)
- Rfn Nicholas Hine (Sharpe's Havoc) - (Sharpe's Battle)
- Rfn Thompson (Sharpe's Battle) †
- Rfn Finn (Sharpe's Battle)
- Rfn Cameron (Sharpe's Rifles - Sharpe's Battle)
- Rfn Sims (Sharpe's Rifles - Sharpe's Battle)
- Rfn Tobias Moore (Sharpe's Honour - Sharpe's Battle)
- Rfn Bradshaw (Sharpe's Gold - Sharpe's Battle)
- Rfn Millerson (Sharpe's Battle)
- Rfn Fergus Slattery (Sharpe's Havoc - Sharpe's Fury) †
- Rfn McNeill (Sharpe's Havoc - Sharpe's Escape)
- Rfn Carter (Sharpe's Havoc) - (Sharpe's Escape)
- Rfn Harvey (Sharpe's Rifles - Sharpe's Escape)
- Rfn Skillicorn (Sharpe's Gold) †
- Rfn Isaiah Tongue (Sharpe's Rifles - Sharpe's Gold) †
- Rfn Pendleton (Sharpe's Havoc - Sharpe's Eagle) †
- Rfn Gataker (Sharpe's Rifles - Sharpe's Eagle) †
- Rfn John Williamson (Sharpe's Rifles - Sharpe's Havoc) † (traitor)
- Rfn Ned Tarrant (Sharpe's Rifles - Sharpe's Havoc) (missing in action)
- Rfn Sean Donnelly (Sharpe's Rifles - Sharpe's Havoc) †
- Cpl Matthew Dodd (Sharpe's Rifles - Sharpe's Escape) (missing in action)
- Sgt Latimer (Sharpe's Battle - Sharpe's Company)
- Sgt Williams (Sharpe's Rifles) †
- RSM Patrick Harper (Sharpe's Prey - Sharpe's Devil)

After making their way to Portugal, and taking part in the Battle of the Douro, Sharpe and his surviving 30 riflemen are attached to the Light Company of the South Essex Regiment (a fictional regiment) as part of Wellesley's Peninsula Army. Some of the men in the South Essex are:

- Pte Peters
- Pte Kirby
- Pte Gutteridge
- Pte Roach
- Pte Batten
- Pte Clayton † (killed at Waterloo)
- Pte Dobbs
- Pte Mellors
- Pte Farrell
- Pte Paddock
- Pte Angel
- Cpl Jackson
- Sgt Read (WIA)
- Sgt McGivern
- Sgt Huckfield (WIA) (lost a finger at Waterloo)
- Sgt Charlie Weller
- Sgt Obadiah Hakeswill † (executed for his many war crimes)
- RSM Maclaird †
- Ens Denny †
- Ens Mattews † (murdered by Hakeswill)
- Ens Collip
- Ens Jack Bullen (POW)
- Ens Iliffe †
- Ens McDonald †
- Lt Michael Trumper-Jones
- Cpt Robert Knowles † (murdered by Obadiah Hakeswill)
- Cpt Carline † (killed at Waterloo)
- Cpt Smith † (killed at Waterloo)
- Maj Harry Price
- Maj Peter D'Alembord (WIA) (loses a leg at Waterloo)

Sharpe takes part in a number of notable actions, either with the South Essex or on detached duty for Wellesley's spymaster, Captain Michael Hogan of the Royal Engineers. These include capturing a French Imperial Eagle at the Battle of Talavera in 1809 (fulfilling a promise to a dying captain he respects), and the storming of the breach at Badajoz. He also takes an active role in the first siege of Almeida, the battles of Bussaco, Barossa, Ciudad Rodrigo, Fuentes de Onoro, Salamanca, Vitoria, and Toulouse. Over this period, he rises in rank from lieutenant to captain to major, eventually taking unofficial command of the entire regiment. Sharpe's Irish friend Harper rises from rifleman to regimental sergeant major.

His intelligence work for Wellesley brings him the long-lasting enmity of the fictional French spymaster Pierre Ducos, who conspires several times to destroy Sharpe's career, reputation or life.

Prior to the Battle of Waterloo, Sharpe is appointed aide to the Prince of Orange, with the rank of lieutenant colonel. Disgusted by the Prince's dangerous incompetence during the course of the battle, Sharpe deserts his post (making an attempt on the prince's life afterwards), but comes to the aid of his old regiment, steadying the line and preventing a French breakthrough. Wellesley then gives him command of the unit for the remainder of the battle (Sharpe's Waterloo).

Following Napoleon's defeat, Sharpe ends up in Paris with the occupying allied armies. There he uncovers and defeats a secret Bonapartist group (Sharpe's Assassin). Afterwards, he retires from the army.

=== Retirement ===
In 1820 Sharpe, living as a farmer in Normandy, is commissioned by the Countess of Mouromorto to find her husband, Don Blas Vivar, who has disappeared in the Spanish colony of Chile (Sharpe's Devil); both she and her husband had become acquainted with Sharpe in 1809, during the events leading up to the assault on Santiago de Compostela (recounted in Sharpe's Rifles). En route to South America, Sharpe and Patrick Harper meet Napoleon, in exile on Saint Helena, who makes Sharpe an unwitting accomplice to his escape plot. Sharpe becomes entangled in Lord Cochrane's risky schemes on behalf of the rebels in the Chilean War of Independence. In the end, he finds Blas Vivar alive, and Napoleon dies before he can escape.

== Equipment ==
During the earliest (chronological) books Sharpe is a private and later sergeant, and so his uniform and weapons largely are in line with Army regulations. His first sword was a 1796 light cavalry sabre which with officer's sash are taken from the dead in the wake of the Battle of Assaye.

By the time of Sharpe's Prey as a junior rifle officer, although still carrying a regulation Pattern 1796 light cavalry sabre, Sharpe has begun carrying a Baker rifle as well, and is noted to prefer a heavier sword like the cutlass used by the Navy, as the point of the curved sabre was never where he expected it to be and also lacked the weight to block attacks from a musket and bayonet in close-quarter battles.

In Sharpe's Rifles, Sharpe acquires his other signature weapon. Captain Murray, mortally wounded in the Corunna retreat, leaves his Pattern 1796 heavy cavalry sword to him, a replacement for the sword that broke in the battle. From a French chasseur Harper kills, Sharpe takes his overalls and boots. Sharpe continues to wear his green jacket even whilst serving in a regular infantry battalion out of pride, as do Harper and all of the other elite riflemen. As Sharpe, like the majority of his men, also acquires a French ox-hide pack in place of the inferior British one he is originally issued, more of his equipment is French than British.

In Sharpe's Assassin, immediately after the Battle of Waterloo, Sharpe buries his rifle with rifleman Daniel Hagman and takes Hagman's (a better weapon) as his own.

== Relationships and family ==
Sharpe, the son of a prostitute, has almost no memory of his mother, and no knowledge of his father. The author, Bernard Cornwell, in answer to a query on his website, wrote a riddle which he claims contains the father's identity: "Take you out, put me in and a horse appears in this happy person!". Bernard later confirmed that he does not know who Sharpe's father is, 'and neither does he', although he was tempted to make Sharpe's father French.

Sharpe is both a romantic and a womanizer. In Sharpe's Rifles, Harper notes that "He'll fall in love with anything in a petticoat. I've seen his type before. Got the sense of a half-witted sheep when it comes to women."

In India, Sharpe asks for permission to marry Mary Bickerstaff, who later leaves him (Sharpe's Tiger); he also has a brief affair with Frenchwoman Simone Joubert, who bolts for a new life in America with gems he left with her for safekeeping (Sharpe's Triumph, Sharpe's Fortress).

His relationship with Lady Grace Hale in 1805 has a more lasting impact; the death of his first child, who succumbs only a few hours after Grace dies in childbirth, leaves Sharpe deeply depressed. In Copenhagen, Sharpe falls in love with Astrid Skovgaard, the daughter of an important Danish spy for the British. However, after the British naval attack on Copenhagen, her father refuses to let her marry him. After Sharpe leaves, she and her father are murdered by British spymaster Lord Pumphrey (Sharpe's Trafalgar, Sharpe's Prey), as they know too much and their loyalty has become suspect.

During the early years of the Peninsula Campaign, Sharpe's affections are torn between a Portuguese courtesan, Josefina LaCosta, and the Spanish partisan leader Teresa Moreno (Sharpe's Eagle, Sharpe's Gold). Teresa bears Sharpe a daughter, Antonia (Sharpe's Company), in 1811, and marries Sharpe in 1812, but is murdered a year later by Sharpe's longtime enemy, deserter Obadiah Hakeswill (Sharpe's Enemy). Sharpe leaves his daughter to be raised by Teresa's family, and, as far as is known, never sees her again. Over the same period, Sharpe also has liaisons with an English governess, Sarah Fry (Sharpe's Escape); Caterina Veronica Blazquez, a prostitute who has beguiled Henry Wellesley, Sir Arthur's brother (Sharpe's Fury); and the French spy Hélène Leroux (Sharpe's Sword, Sharpe's Honour).

For some years, Sharpe carries a small portrait of Jane Gibbons, taken after he murders her treacherous brother (Sharpe's Eagle). In 1813, he returns to England to fetch replacements, and meets, elopes with, and marries Jane (Sharpe's Regiment). Sharpe remains faithful to his second wife, but after he is falsely accused of theft and murder, she embarks on an adulterous affair with his former friend Lord John Rossendale and steals the fortune Sharpe had entrusted to her. It is while searching for evidence to clear his name that Sharpe meets and falls in love with Lucille Castineau, the widow of a French officer killed in Russia (Sharpe's Revenge, Sharpe's Waterloo).

Although unable to marry Lucille while Jane lives, Sharpe settles down with her on her family estate in Normandy. They have two children, Patrick-Henri, who becomes a French cavalry officer (and a character in Bernand Cornwell's The Starbuck Chronicles), and Dominique, who ultimately marries an English aristocrat. By 1861, Patrick-Henri, then a colonel in the Imperial Guard Cavalry observing the Union and Confederate armies during the American Civil War, mentions that his mother is "very lonely", so it may be assumed that Sharpe has died sometime before that date. (The Sharpe Companion gives Sharpe's year of death as 1860, though this is never stated in any of the books.) This is contradicted in the television adaptation Sharpe's Challenge, set in 1817, in which Sharpe states that Lucille has already died, but considering this production is not based on any book (only taking a few characters from Sharpe's Tiger) its canonicity is dubious.

== Promotions ==
Date	Details	Novel
c. 1793	Enlisted as a private	
c. 1796–97	Promoted to corporal. Demoted to private after passing wind on parade.	
4 May 1799	Promoted for gallantry to sergeant after Siege of Seringapatam.	Sharpe's Tiger
23 September 1803	Commissioned for gallantry as an ensign by General Wellesley after the Battle of Assaye.	Sharpe's Triumph
c. 1806	On transfer to the 95th Rifles, Sharpe becomes a second lieutenant, equivalent in rank to an ensign, as the Rifles do not have ensigns.	Sharpe's Prey
c. 1807–08	Sharpe promoted to lieutenant – the exact time frame is not referred to in the novels but occurred sometime after the events of Sharpe's Prey and before Sharpe's Rifles.	
July 1809	Gazetted by General Wellesley as a captain after saving the Regimental Colour of the South Essex Battalion at Valdelacasa.	Sharpe's Eagle
January 1812	Reverted to the rank of lieutenant after his gazetting as his captaincy was refused by Horse Guards and in the absence of a vacant captain's position in the South Essex.	Sharpe's Company
7 April 1812	Restored to rank of captain in the South Essex Battalion after successfully leading an unofficial forlorn hope to take the third breach of Badajoz and the death of several captains in the Battalion.	Sharpe's Company
May 1812	Continuity error: In Sharpe's Command, published October 2023 and set two weeks after the sack of Badajoz, Sharpe is stated to be a major (whether army or regimental rank is not mentioned), on detached service with a group of riflemen. The captaincy he regained in Sharpe's Company is also not mentioned.	Sharpe's Command
14 November 1812	Promoted to the army (as opposed to regimental) rank of brevet major by the Prince Regent.	Sharpe's Enemy
1815	Serves as lieutenant colonel in the 5th Belgian Light Dragoons (Dutch Army) led by the Prince of Orange during the Hundred Days. He later acts as colonel of his old regiment during the Battle of Waterloo. At the climax of the battle, he is given official command after Wellington says, "That is your Battalion now! So take it forward!" At the end of the war, Wellington confirms his command, allowing Sharpe to retire from the army on a lieutenant-colonel's pension.	Sharpe's Waterloo, Sharpe's Assassin

== Historical achievements ==
Sharpe is often portrayed as the driving force in a number of pivotal historical events. Cornwell admits to taking licence with history, placing Sharpe in the place of another man whose identity is lost to history or sometimes "stealing another man's thunder." Such accomplishments include:

- Disabling a booby trap laid for the British soldiers assaulting Seringapatam (Cornwell points out in the novel's historical note that there never actually was such a booby trap, and the event was based on a British shell that struck a magazine in the city days earlier)
- Killing Tipu Sultan and looting his corpse (the identity of the man who killed the sultan is unknown; like Sharpe, the soldier probably wished to remain anonymous because of the riches he acquired)
- Saving Arthur Wellesley's life at the Battle of Assaye (Wellesley was unhorsed and forced to defend himself from Maratha artillerymen for a few crucial moments; Cornwell notes that if any soldier or officer had saved his life during this fight, he would almost certainly have rewarded him with a promotion)
- Storming the walls of the inner fortress at Gawilghur and opening the gates to the besieging forces (in reality, this was achieved by Captain Campbell leading the light company of the 94th Scotch Brigade; in the novel, Campbell and his troops are the first to join Sharpe once they realise what he's planning)
- Preventing the Danish fleet from being set on fire during the Second Battle of Copenhagen (while the order to set the fleet on fire was given, it is unknown why it was never carried out)
- Finding the boats that allowed Wellesley's forces to ambush Marshal Nicolas Soult's forces at the Second Battle of Porto (Cornwell notes that in reality a Portuguese barber approached the British forces of his own volition rather than being sent across by Sharpe)
- Being the first British soldier to capture an Imperial Eagle at the Battle of Talavera (in reality, the first French Eagle captured by the British was by Ensign Edward Keogh and Sergeant Patrick Masterson at the Battle of Barrossa in 1811)
- Successfully assaulting the central breach at Badajoz (according to Cornwell's historical note, the central breach remained largely unused during the assault)
- Destroying the Army of Deserters and taking their leader "Marshal Pot-au-Feu" Deron captive (Cornwell notes that the historic Deserters' Army was finally destroyed by the French, though they did hand British deserters over, as shown in the novel)
- Deliberately triggering the massive explosion that destroyed the fortress of Almeida (usually attributed to accident, combined with careless British handling of their munitions store)
- Retrieving and restoring the Imperial Family's treasure (in his note, Cornwell notes that several chests of personal belongings and riches were lost in the chaos of the French defeat of 1814, but how this happened and their final fate are unknown)
- Carrying the news of Napoleon's invasion of Belgium to Wellington at the Duchess of Richmond's ball, during the Waterloo campaign (the bearer of the message was one of the Prince of Orange's ADCs: Lieutenant Henry Webster, 9th Light Dragoons)
- Firing the shot that wounded the Prince of Orange during the Battle of Waterloo, forcing him to retire from the field (in reality, this shot was most likely fired by a French skirmisher)
- Taking command of a regiment in driving off the advance of the French Imperial Guard at the Battle of Waterloo (the regiments that actually held off the Imperial Guard are in the novel as well)
- Saving the Duke of Wellington from two assassination attempts in Paris (Cornwell explains that the first attempt happened, though the shooter simply missed, while the second is fictional and based on a likely deliberate fire that broke out in a house Wellington had been in days earlier).

== Novels, short stories, and non-fiction ==
Bernard Cornwell has written 24 novels and three short stories starring Richard Sharpe. The first book Sharpe's Eagle was written in 1981, with Sharpe in Spain at the Talavera Campaign in 1809. The next seven books were written in order, up to Sharpe's Siege in 1814. The novel Sharpe's Rifles was written next, set earlier in 1809 at the time of the retreat from Corunna, Spain. The next four books follow on from Sharpe's Siege up to Sharpe's Devil (1992), set in 1820–21. This twelfth book completes Sharpe's timeline.

Following the success of the TV series starting in 1993, Cornwell returned to Sharpe to write Sharpe's Battle (1995), which is set between Sharpe's Gold and Sharpe's Company, which takes place in 1811. Cornwell then moved to the beginning of Sharpe's army career in British India, 1799, with Sharpe's Tiger (1997). This began a series of five prequel books, closing with Sharpe's Prey (2003) which depicts the Siege of Copenhagen in 1807.

Between 2003 and 2007, Cornwell wrote three novels set between Sharpe's Rifles and Sharpe's Battle. He returned to the series in 2021 and has written three additional novels, set between Sharpe's Company and Sharpe's Devil.

Cornwell published the non-fiction book Waterloo: The History of Four Days, Three Armies and Three Battles in September 2014, timely for the 200th anniversary of the Battle of Waterloo.

Sharpe possibly appears in Simon Scarrow's The Fields of Death, although his surname is not confirmed. A major in the 95th Rifles called Richard and who, "unusually for an officer ... carries a rifle like his men", delivers captured French orders to the Duke of Wellington indicating the enemy's intention to fall back to Vitoria.

Series no.	Title	Sub-title	First published	Revision date
01	Sharpe's Tiger	Richard Sharpe and the Siege of Seringapatam, 1799	1997	
02	Sharpe's Triumph	Richard Sharpe and the Battle of Assaye, September 1803	1998	
03	Sharpe's Fortress	Richard Sharpe and the Siege of Gawilghur, December 1803	1999	
04	Sharpe's Trafalgar	Richard Sharpe and the Battle of Trafalgar, October 1805	2000	
05	Sharpe's Prey	Richard Sharpe and the Siege of Copenhagen, 1807	2001	
06	Sharpe's Rifles	Richard Sharpe and the French Invasion of Galicia, January 1809	1988	
07	Sharpe's Havoc	Richard Sharpe and the Campaign in Northern Portugal, spring 1809	2003	
08	Sharpe's Eagle	Richard Sharpe and the Talavera Campaign, July 1809	1981	
09	Sharpe's Gold	Richard Sharpe and the Destruction of Almeida, August 1810	1981	
10	Sharpe's Escape	Richard Sharpe and the Battle of Bussaco, September 1810	2004	
11	Sharpe's Fury	Richard Sharpe and the Battle of Barrosa March 1811, winter 1811	2007	
12	Sharpe's Battle	Richard Sharpe and the Battle of Fuentes de Oñoro, May 1811	1995	
13	Sharpe's Company	Richard Sharpe and the Siege of Badajoz, January to April 1812	1982	
14	Sharpe's Command	Richard Sharpe and the Bridge at Almaraz, May 1812	2023	
15	Sharpe's Sword	Richard Sharpe and the Salamanca Campaign, June and July 1812	1983	
15.1	"Sharpe's Skirmish"	Richard Sharpe and the Defence of the Tormes, August 1812 (short story)	1999	revised extended edition published 2002
16	Sharpe's Enemy	Richard Sharpe and the Defence of Portugal, Christmas 1812	1984	
17	Sharpe's Honour	Richard Sharpe and the Vitoria Campaign, February to June 1813	1985	
18	Sharpe's Regiment	Richard Sharpe and the Invasion of France, June to November 1813	1986	
19	Sharpe's Storm	Richard Sharpe and the Invasion of Southern France, 1813 November	2025	
19.1	"Sharpe's Christmas"	(late) December 1813, Franco-Spanish border (short story)	1994	revised edition published 2003
20	Sharpe's Siege	Richard Sharpe and the Winter Campaign, 1814	1987	
21	Sharpe's Revenge	Richard Sharpe and the Peace of 1814	1989	
22	Sharpe's Waterloo	Richard Sharpe and the Waterloo Campaign, 15 June to 18 June 1815	1990	
23	Sharpe's Assassin	Richard Sharpe and the Occupation of Paris, 1815	2021	
23.1	"Sharpe's Ransom"	December 1816, Normandy (short story)	1994	revised edition published 2003
24	Sharpe's Devil	Richard Sharpe, Thomas Cochrane and the Emperor, 1820–1821	1992	

== See also ==
- List of Sharpe series characters
- The Starbuck Chronicles
- The Flashman Papers
