= Sharpe's Devil =

1992 historical novel by Bernard Cornwell

- First edition
- Author: Bernard Cornwell
- Language: English
- Series: Richard Sharpe
- Genre: Historical novels
- Publisher: HarperCollins
- Publication date: 1992
- Publication place: United Kingdom
- Media type: Print (hardback & paperback) and audio-CD
- Pages: 284
- ISBN: 0-00-223718-0
- Preceded by: Sharpe's Assassin

Sharpe's Devil is the twelfth historical novel in the Richard Sharpe series written by Bernard Cornwell and published in 1992. The story is set in 1820, with Sharpe and Harper en route to Chile to find their old friend Blas Vivar. Along the way they encounter the exiled Napoleon Bonaparte and the Scottish former Royal Navy officer Lord Cochrane. Chronologically, this is the most recent book in the series, with all subsequent novels (as of 2025) depicting earlier events in Sharpe's career.

== Plot summary ==
Doña Louisa Vivar, whom Sharpe befriended in Sharpe's Rifles, visits Sharpe and asks him to search for her husband, Don Blas Vivar, who disappeared while serving as Captain-General of Chile, a Spanish possession threatened by rebels. Sharpe and Harper sail to Chile with Spanish Colonel Ruiz and his regimental officers aboard the frigate Espiritu Santo, commanded by Captain Ardiles. The group decide to stop off at Saint Helena to pay a visit to exiled French emperor Napoleon Bonaparte. Napoleon grants an audience and asks Sharpe and Harper to remain for a private conversation. Napoleon persuades Sharpe to take a gift, a portrait of the emperor, to an admirer in Chile for him.

British Consul George Blair welcomes Sharpe and Harper to the Chilean port of Valdivia and informs them that Blas Vivar's body was found and buried three months previously. Sharpe and Harper visit Captain Marquinez to arrange permission to travel to Puerto Crucero, exhume the body and return it to Spain. Back at their lodgings, they interrupt burglars who wound Harper and escape with their possessions, including Napoleon's portrait.

Sharpe and Harper meet with Bautista, who announces that he has caught the thieves, whom he has branded on the spot, and returns all the stolen goods except for the portrait. When Bautista asks if everything is there, Sharpe says nothing is missing. Marquinez provides the required passes and permits and rides out with Sharpe and Harper on the first stage of their journey. Overnighting at the "Celestial Fort", Sharpe suspects that their escort, commanded by Sergeant Dregara, has orders to kill them. He persuades the garrison commander, Captain Morillo, to let them leave very early the next morning; he provides a native guide called Ferdinand to take them safely across the hills.

Sharpe and Harper arrive in Puerto Crucero and are welcomed by Major Suarez, but before they can exhume the body, Sergeant Dregara catches up and arrests them. After five days in prison, they are accused by Bautista of espionage. He reveals that a coded message was found hidden in the back of the portrait. As punishment, the Captain-General has Ferdinand executed, confiscates the riflemen's money and weapons and has them put aboard the Espiritu Santo for its return trip to Europe.

Lord Cochrane, a highly successful former Royal Navy admiral now in service to the Chilean rebels under Bernardo O'Higgins, uses a ruse, a seemingly disabled American whaler, to get his men aboard the Espiritu Santo and, with the assistance of Sharpe and Harper, capture it, taking Captain Ardiles prisoner. The Espiritu Santo is in great danger of sinking, but Cochrane insists on sailing to the Spanish-held port of Valdivia. Fortunately, his flagship, the O'Higgins, finds them. Cochrane loads Major Miller and his marines aboard the crippled ship, and sets sail for a seemingly suicidal attack upon the port of Puerto Crucero (not Valdivia, as the Espiritu Santo would never make it there).

Cochrane and Miller lead the marines ashore, with Sharpe and Harper in tow, and with supporting fire from the O'Higgins capture the citadel. Blas Vivar's grave is opened to reveal nothing but a dead dog inside. A captured Spanish soldier informs them that Blas Vivar is being held prisoner in Valdivia, so Sharpe reluctantly agrees to join Cochrane's assault on the city.

Despite being massively outnumbered and outgunned, Cochrane sails to Valdivia, hoping his two disguised ships will be mistaken for transports bringing much-needed artillery and reinforcements from Spain. However, his ruse fails. Sharpe recommends landing on a nearby beach and leads an assault on the outlying forts. To Sharpe's amazement, the demoralized Spanish put up token resistance before either fleeing or surrendering, resulting in little loss of life on the rebel side. Without waiting for reinforcements, Cochrane marches his small forces into the city itself, where Sharpe and Harper kill Dregara. Trapped, Bautista commits suicide.

Realising that Blas Vivar is not a prisoner in Valdivia, Sharpe confronts Cochrane, who admits that he took the Spaniard prisoner. Cochrane is plotting to rescue Napoleon, so the Corsican can create another empire in the New World. The coded message was Napoleon's agreement to Cochrane's scheme. Cochrane met Blas Viva, the Count of Mouromorto, under a flag of truce to try to recruit him, having confused him for his Francophile brother; with the confusion removed, he had no choice but to maroon him and some guards on an island. Cochrane duped Sharpe because he needed his help in liberating Valdivia.

Cochrane releases Blas Vivar, but holds him, Sharpe, and Harper incommunicado until the rescue ship sets sail to free Napoleon. When they are released, the three men return to Saint Helena, but are stunned to hear that Napoleon has died. Sharpe is immensely relieved that he is in no way responsible for starting another war.

== Characters ==
Fictional

- Richard Sharpe
- Patrick Harper, Irish former Regimental Sergeant Major in Sharpe's regiment, who now operates a tavern in Dublin (and also acts as a fence for stolen horses). Though he is still as strong as ever, he has also become immensely fat ("a prize boar") as a result of drinking his own wares.
- Captain Ardiles, the reclusive and sardonic Spanish captain of the frigate Espiritu Santo
- Miguel Bautista, a cruel, corrupt and greedy politician who succeeds Don Vivar as Captain-General of Chile
- George Blair, a surly Liverpool merchant acting as British Consul in Valdivia
- Lucille Castineau, French noblewoman and farmer, Sharpe's common-law wife and mother of his two young children, Patrick and Dominique
- Ferdinand, a native scout who leads Sharpe and Harper safely across the mountains and is executed as punishment by Bautista
- Sergeant Dregara, a Spanish soldier who does Baustista’s dirty work
- Captain Marquinez, a young and "strikingly handsome" Spanish officer who facilitates Sharpe's mission
- Major Miller, British marine commander working for Cochrane
- Captain Morillo, Spanish commander of the Celestial Fort who warns Sharpe of an ambush and is demoted to private and sent to the mines as punishment by Bautista
- Major Suarez, Spanish commander of the Chilean port of Puerto Crucero who arrests and imprisons Sharpe and Harper after their arrival.
- Lieutenant Otero, first officer of the frigate Espiritu Santo who tells Sharpe of the rebel admiral, Scottish Lord Cochrane
- Colonel Ruiz, commander of a Spanish artillery regiment who travels to Chile with Sharpe
- Don Blas Vivar, aristocratic Spanish military commander who befriended Sharpe in Sharpe's Rifles
- Doña Louisa Vivar, wife of Don Vivar who Sharpe had first known as Miss Parker in Sharpe’s Rifles

Historical

- Napoleon Bonaparte, French emperor exiled to Saint Helena who dupes Sharpe into running an errand for him
- Lord Cochrane, a Scottish ex-Royal Navy officer who now serves the Chilean revolutionaries
