= Sharpe's Triumph =

1998 historical novel by Bernard Cornwell

- First edition
- Author: Bernard Cornwell
- Language: English
- Series: Richard Sharpe stories
- Genre: Historical novels
- Publisher: HarperCollins
- Publication date: 26 February 1998
- Publication place: United Kingdom
- Media type: Print (hardcover and paperback) and audio-CD
- Pages: 400 (hardcover); 384 (paperback)
- ISBN: 0-00-225630-4 (hardcover)
- OCLC: 40337475
- Preceded by: Sharpe's Tiger
- Followed by: Sharpe's Fortress

Sharpe's Triumph is the second historical novel in the Richard Sharpe series by Bernard Cornwell, first published in 1998. Sharpe is a sergeant in the army who saves the life of General Arthur Wellesley at Ahmednagar and is made an officer by battlefield promotion.

== Plot summary ==
Sergeant Richard Sharpe and a small detachment arrive at an isolated East India Company fort to transport 80,000 rounds of recovered stolen ammunition to the armory at Seringapatam. While Sharpe and his men rest, a company of East India Company sepoys arrive under the command of Lieutenant William Dodd. Dodd abruptly has his men massacre the unsuspecting, outnumbered garrison. Sharpe is wounded and feigns death, allowing him to escape Dodd's determination to leave no witnesses.

Back in Seringapatam, Sharpe's friend, Colonel McCandless, whom Sharpe met four years earlier during the siege of Seringapatam (Sharpe's Tiger), questions him about Dodd. Dodd deserted the East India Company, taking with him his sepoys, and McCandless has been tasked with bringing him to justice, lest it give others similar ideas. McCandless orders Sharpe to accompany him since he can identify Dodd.

Dodd joins Colonel Anthony Pohlmann, commander of Scindia's army, at the city of Ahmednuggur and is rewarded with a promotion to major and command of his own battalion. Since the Mysore Campaign, the British have been pushing further north into the Maratha Confederacy's territory. Scindia is one of the Maratha rulers who have decided to fight the British. Scindia orders Pohlmann to assign a regiment to defend Ahmednuggur, so Pohlmann gives Dodd command of the unit and instructions to inflict casualties, but most importantly, withdraw and keep the regiment intact, as the city cannot be held.

Meanwhile, Sergeant Obadiah Hakeswill correctly guesses that Sharpe killed Tippoo Sultan and stole his jewels four years earlier at Seringapatam. Hakeswill frames him for an attack on his former company commander, Captain Morris. Given a warrant to arrest Sharpe, Hakeswill recruits six cutthroats to help him murder Sharpe and take the treasure.

Sharpe and McCandless travel to the British army, escorted by Syud Sevajee, the Maratha leader of a band of cavalrymen working for the East India Company. The army is under the command of Major General Arthur Wellesley, Sharpe's former regimental commander and the future Duke of Wellington. Upon arrival at Ahmednuggur, Wellesley quickly launches a risky escalade without the usual days-long artillery bombardment in a bid to take the enemy by surprise. He quickly captures the poorly fortified town, to the amazement of Dodd, who has a poor opinion of Wellesley. Despite this, Dodd manages to extract his troops from the rout and retreats to Pohlmann's army. In the chaos of the battle, Sharpe rescues Simone Joubert, the wife of a French captain in Dodd's regiment. Under the pretext of returning Madame Joubert to her husband, McCandless hopes to assess the Maratha army's strength. They do not leave immediately, and Sharpe spends the night with Simone, though she regrets her decision the next day.

The next day, they reach the Maratha army. Pohlmann deduces McCandless's intentions, but knowing that his army vastly outnumbers the British, allows him to inspect everything he wants. Pohlmann also tries to recruit Sharpe, offering to make him a lieutenant. He tells Sharpe of the various successes that other lowly European soldiers have had in India, including his own rise from East India Company sergeant. That evening, Sharpe considers defecting, but, before he can make a decision, his and McCandless's horses are stolen and McCandless is shot in the thigh. Sharpe apprehends one of the thieves, who turns out to be one of Dodd's men. Everyone knows that Dodd ordered the theft, but Pohlmann only has the thief executed by being trampled by an elephant. Meanwhile, Hakeswill takes his request to arrest Sharpe to Wellesley, who informs him that Sharpe will not return for some time. He assigns Hakeswill to the baggage train in the meantime, infuriating the sergeant.

The Maratha army moves on, leaving McCandless behind at his own request. Sharpe decides to look after the wounded colonel, thereby turning down Pohlmann's offer. Nevertheless, he begins to wonder about how he might become an officer. McCandless cautions Sharpe. At the time, almost all of the officers in the British Army come from wealthy families and pay for their commissions. Those exceptional few who rise from the ranks are resented and have little chance of advancement. McCandless recovers. Syud Sevajee locates them and delivers McCandless's report to Wellesley.

When McCandless is well enough, he and Sharpe rejoin the army as it advances towards Borkardan. Using one of the Tippoo's emeralds, Sharpe buys one of Wellesley's horses for McCandless, though he pretends to Wellesley that McCandless is the purchaser. The surprised McCandless learns about Sharpe and the Tippoo's death. The next day, Hakeswill attempts to arrest Sharpe, but McCandless smudges the ink on the warrant so that it reads "Sharp", not "Sharpe", and refuses to accept the document.

After weeks of aimless marching, the Maratha leaders meet and finally decide to engage the British near Assaye. Pohlmann is given overall command. Wellesley has two small armies, one under his direct command and the other under Colonel Stevenson, but separated by miles. Pohlmann plans to fight and defeat them separately. Wellesley discovers that the enemy is much closer than he thought and ready to spring Pohlmann's trap, but is still determined to attack, despite being greatly outnumbered, both in men and cannons.

Pohlmann deploys his army at what he is told are the only usable fords of the River Kaitna, but Wellesley deduces that there must be another one between two villages on opposite banks of the river. Using this ford, Wellesley crosses the river to try to launch a flank attack, but Pohlmann redeploys to face him. Wellesley's aide is killed, and Sharpe takes his place. Back with the baggage, McCandless confronts Hakeswill about the warrant and warns Hakeswill that he knows he lied and that he will inform his commander. On the British left, the 78th Highland Regiment and the sepoys advance through heavy artillery fire and rout much of the Pohlmann's infantry. On the right, however, the 74th and some picquets advance too far towards the village of Assaye and are forced to form square against attack from Maratha light cavalry. Dodd's regiment then fires on the pinned-down unit, which cannot deploy into line to fire back effectively.

Meanwhile, some Maratha gunners retake their guns and fire them into the rear of Wellesley's men, so Wellesley orders a cavalry charge. During the fight, he is unhorsed alone amidst the enemy. Sharpe, the only British soldier nearby, launches a savage attack, saving his commander and single-handedly killing many men. Friendly troops arrive, and a shaken Wellesley leaves. With the collapse of the Maratha right, Dodd is forced to retreat. During the fighting, Hakeswill finds McCandless alone and kills him.

As the Maratha forces flee in disarray, Sharpe comes across Pohlmann—who has been betrayed and robbed by Dodd—but does not apprehend him. He also finds Simone Joubert. Dodd killed her husband during the retreat, so Sharpe takes her under his protection again.

When next he encounters Wellesley, the latter gives him a battlefield promotion, making him an ensign in the 74th. Afterward, Hakeswill tries again to arrest Sharpe, but Sharpe's new commanding officer points out that the warrant for Sergeant Sharpe is useless against Ensign Sharpe. Sharpe triumphantly forces Hakeswill, who initially refuses to acknowledge Sharpe's new rank, to address him as "sir".

== Characters ==
- Richard Sharpe – British sergeant, protagonist
- Major General Arthur Wellesley – commander of British and Indian forces in south central India
- Lieutenant Colin Campbell - who led the storming of the walls of Ahmednaghar
- Sergeant Obadiah Hakeswill – Sharpe's enemy in the British Army
- Simone Joubert – wife of French Captain Joubert
- Colonel Hector McCandless – Scottish head of intelligence for the British East India Company
- Colonel Anthony Pohlmann – Hanoverian former East India Company sergeant turned warlord, Scindia's army's commander
- Major William Dodd – renegade British East India Company lieutenant, now serving Scindia
- Daulat Scindia – the raja of Gwalior, a state within the Maratha Confederacy
- Raghji Bhonsle – the raja of Berar, an ally of Scindia
- Captain Morris – the commanding officer of the 33rd Light Company

== Release details ==
- 1998, UK, HarperCollins ISBN 0-00-225630-4, Pub date 26 February 1998, hardback (First edition)
- 1998, UK, HarperCollins ISBN 978-0-00-105482-0, Pub date 1 June 1998, Audio book cassette
- 1999, UK, HarperCollins ISBN 0-00-651030-2, Pub date 5 July 1999, paperback
- 2000, USA, HarperCollins ISBN 0-06-095197-4, Pub date August 2000, paperback
- 2001, UK, Chivers Audio Books ISBN 0-7540-5474-8, Pub date December 2001, Audio book CD
- 2005, USA, HarperTorch ISBN 0-06-074804-4, Pub date June 2005, paperback
- 2006, UK, HarperCollins ISBN 0-00-723506-2, Pub date 18 April 2006, paperback (recent TV tie-in)
