= Sharpe's Prey =

2001 historical novel by Bernard Cornwell

- First edition cover
- Author: Bernard Cornwell
- Cover artist: Danilo Ducek
- Language: English
- Series: Richard Sharpe stories
- Genre: Historical novels
- Publisher: HarperCollins
- Publication date: 23 April 2001
- Publication place: United Kingdom
- Media type: Print (hardcover and paperback) and audio-CD
- Pages: 260 (hardcover); 304 (paperback)
- ISBN: 0-00-225875-7 (hardcover); ISBN 0-00-651310-7 (paperback)
- OCLC: 45735459
- Preceded by: Sharpe's Trafalgar
- Followed by: Sharpe's Rifles

Sharpe's Prey is the fifth historical novel in the Richard Sharpe series by Bernard Cornwell, first published in 2001. The story is set in 1807 during the Napoleonic Wars .

Second Lieutenant Richard Sharpe is sent to Copenhagen in 1807 with the job of protecting a nobleman on a secret mission. Sharpe soon discovers that his task is complicated by traitors, spies and the bombardment of Copenhagen.

== Plot summary ==
The year is 1807, and Richard Sharpe is at a very low point in his life. His beloved aristocratic lover, Lady Grace Hale, died in childbirth, along with their newborn son. Her family's lawyers then took all of Sharpe's wealth (loot he obtained in India), claiming it was Grace's, so it reverts to her family. Destitute and relegated to the menial job of quartermaster, Sharpe is on the streets of London, contemplating leaving the army.

First though, he revisits the foundling home where he was raised to get his revenge. He robs and kills Jem Hocking, his childhood tormentor.

Then a former commanding officer, Major General David Baird, finds him in a pub. Captain John Lavisser was assigned a bodyguard for a secret mission to Copenhagen, but the bodyguard was killed, supposedly by a common footpad, and a replacement is needed immediately. Baird persuades Sharpe to take the job. Lavisser does not want a bodyguard since he already has a hulking servant and ex-footpad named Barker, but orders are orders. Lord Pumphrey of the Foreign Office gives Sharpe (but not Lavisser) a contact in case he runs into trouble.

Denmark is neutral, but has a powerful fleet. Napoleon wants it to replace the ships France lost at the Battle of Trafalgar, and Britain is equally determined to see to it that does not happen. Lavisser's task is to bribe the Danish crown prince to hand over the fleet for safekeeping. (Lavisser's grandfather is the prince's chamberlain, and they are also related by marriage.) If that fails, the British will have to seize the ships by force.

When they go ashore in Denmark, Sharpe narrowly escapes being killed by Barker. He walks to Copenhagen and goes to see Ole Skovgaard, the emergency contact. Skovgaard turns out to be the main spy for Britain in Denmark. Meanwhile, Lavisser defects to the Danes and "confesses" that the British have sent an assassin to kill the crown prince. Skovgaard reads this lie in the newspaper and locks Sharpe in a room to await Lavisser. Sharpe escapes just in time. Lavisser turns out to be in the employ of the French; he and his men torture Skovgaard for the names of his contacts throughout Europe. Sharpe manages to kill some of Lavisser's henchmen and drive the rest off. During his stay at Skovgaard's house, he and Skovgaard's beautiful widowed daughter, Astrid, become attracted to each other. They eventually sleep together, and Sharpe contemplates settling down in Copenhagen with her.

When the British besiege Copenhagen, Sharpe joins them. The Danes refuse to surrender their fleet, so the British bombard the city. Sharpe, by now knowing the general layout of Copenhagen, sneaks a small force into the city and guides them to the Danish ships, which have been prepared for burning in case the British break in. The men hide aboard the ships and safeguard them against burning. Meanwhile, Sharpe goes to Skovgaard's, only to find he has been captured and tortured again by Lavisser, who obtains the names of the British spies. Sharpe rescues Skovgaard, kills Lavisser and Barker, and gets the list of names. The city surrenders, and the Danish fleet is captured intact.

Skovgaard will no longer work for the British after what they have done to his city. He also orders Astrid to break up with Sharpe, which she reluctantly does. Lord Pumphrey has Sharpe sent back to England as soon as possible, as he does not want the rifleman to learn that he must have the Skovgaards killed; they know too much.

== Characters ==
- Richard Sharpe – Second lieutenant and quartermaster in the 95th Rifles
- Patrick Harper – Soldier in the 95th Rifles who makes his first, albeit brief, appearance, along with Harris and Cooper
- General Baird – Dispatches Sharpe on his mission
- Captain John Lavisser – A turncoat British Guards officer
- Barker – Lavisser's cutthroat henchman
- Ole Skovgaard – Danish merchant and spy for the British
- Astrid Skovgaard – A Danish widow whom Sharpe has a relationship with
- Lord Pumphrey – A Machiavellian Foreign Office spymaster
- Aksel Bang – Skovgaard's clerk, who betrays Skovgaard to Lavisser
- Arthur Wellesley – Divisional commander
- Joel Chase – Captain of the Pucelle and friend of Sharpe from India
- Captain Gordon – An aide to (and nephew of) General Baird
- Captain Dunnett – Sharpe's superior officer in the 95th Rifles, with whom he has a strained relationship
- Captain Murray – A company commander in the 95th Rifles

== Release details ==
- 2001, UK, HarperCollins ISBN 0-00-225875-7, Pub date 23 April 2001, hardback (first edition)
- 2002, UK, HarperCollins ISBN 0-00-651310-7, Pub date 5 June 2002, paperback
