= Sharpe's Sword =

1983 historical novel by Bernard Cornwell

- First edition
- Author: Bernard Cornwell
- Language: English
- Series: Richard Sharpe stories
- Genre: Historical novels
- Publisher: Collins
- Publication date: 1983
- Publication place: United Kingdom
- Media type: Print (hardback and paperback) and audio-CD (Audio book)
- Pages: 319 pp
- ISBN: 0-00-221410-5
- OCLC: 43632016
- Preceded by: Sharpe's Command
- Followed by: Sharpe's Skirmish (chronological); Sharpe's Enemy (publication)

Sharpe's Sword is a historical novel in the Richard Sharpe series by Bernard Cornwell. It is the fourth in the series, being first published in 1983, though the fifteenth chronologically. Set in the summer of 1812 including the Battle of Salamanca on 22 July 1812, the story follows Sharpe and his friend Sergeant Harper involved in espionage while hunting down the sadistic and highly dangerous Colonel Philippe Leroux.

== Plot summary ==
French Colonel Philippe Leroux has extracted the secret identity of El Mirador, Britain's most important spy in Spain, from a priest he tortured. Facing inevitable capture, Leroux kills Captain Delmas and assumes his identity, knowing that the British would never exchange an imperial colonel. He surrenders to Sharpe, who covets Leroux's sword, a superbly made Klingenthal heavy cavalry sword. As Captain Delmas, Leroux gives his parole, but while he is being escorted back to Wellington's headquarters, he kills his teenage escort and flees toward Salamanca. He gains sanctuary in one of the three French-controlled forts outside Salamanca, after Irish Father Curtis protects him from the locals.

Sharpe confronts Curtis, who explains that the Frenchman is in fact Leroux, and that he was protecting the city's residents against Leroux's revenge if the city were to be recaptured by the French. Sharpe takes an instant dislike to Curtis, whom he thinks is sympathetic to the French. In Salamanca, Sharpe is introduced to the breathtakingly beautiful Marquesa de Casares el Grande y Melida Sadaba and to Captain Lord Jack Spears. Wellington's army arrives at Salamanca as part of their manoeuvring against Marshal Marmont's army. Major Michael Hogan examines a list Sharpe got from Leroux; the list was stolen from Hogan and contains the names of many of his spies. Many of them have been tortured and killed by Leroux.

Frustrated that Marmont will not fight on his terms, Wellington sends two battalions against three French battalions in an effort to provoke Marmont, but Marmont does not rise to the bait.

Following the battle, Wellington places Sharpe and the Light Company under Hogan's command (as he and his men can identify Leroux) to ensure Leroux does not escape from the French forts. The Sixth Division attempts to storm the forts by surprise, but the French have been tipped off and slaughter the attackers. Sharpe is invited to a party by La Marquesa, but decides not to attend. Nevertheless Lord Spears later persuades him to go. As he prepares to leave the party, a servant takes him for a private meeting with La Marquesa. She obliquely claims to be El Mirador, and begs Sharpe to protect her from Leroux. They become lovers (her fat old husband being away suppressing a revolt in Brazil); she tells him her first name is Helena.

After several days, the forts are assaulted again and quickly surrender. Sharpe and his men cannot find Leroux. After searching the wounded, Sharpe allows them to be taken to the hospital in Salamanca. After Harper discovers a dead French soldier who does not have all his intestines, Sharpe realises that Leroux has disguised himself as a soldier with a severe stomach wound. Sharpe and Harper race to the hospital. Harper discovers Leroux, but Harper is pushed down a staircase and knocked unconscious. Sharpe engages in a sword duel with Leroux until Sharpe's blade is shattered. Before Leroux can kill him, a sentry comes to his aid, and Leroux flees. Leroux shoots Sharpe in the stomach.

Harper is found unconscious, but Sharpe cannot be found. It is believed that he was mistaken for a dead French soldier and buried in a mass grave. In fact, he has been taken to the death ward in the dank basement, where unrecognised, he drifts in and out of consciousness. Hogan and Harper finally find him, barely clinging to life. While the army moves on, Harper and Isabella (the peasant girl Harper rescued in the Battle of Badajoz) minister to Sharpe. In the meantime, Hogan assigns Lord Spears and some men to discreetly guard El Mirador.

With time on his hands, Harper buys a sword and works on it. When Lord Spears visits Sharpe, he suggests that Lord Spears is protecting El Mirador. Spears is made uncomfortable, but confirms Sharpe's hunch.

A month later, Father Curtis tells Sharpe that one of his correspondents in Paris has discovered that Leroux has a multi-lingual sister named Hélène. Curtis believes she is La Marquesa. Hogan does as well, and asks Sharpe to feed her false information. Sharpe realises that Curtis is El Mirador, not La Marquesa. While hoping that she is not a French spy, he does deceive her later that evening.

Sharpe, still not fully healed, rejoins Wellington's army. Marmont, already suspecting that Wellington is racing for the border, has these suspicions confirmed by a message from La Marquesa and he sets out in pursuit, enabling Wellington to spring his trap. The Battle of Salamanca ensues. The French left is destroyed by a British cavalry charge. Marmont and his deputy are both injured, so General Clausel assumes command. The British Fourth Division (including the South Essex) attack the French centre, but are repulsed by a French counterattack. Sharpe sees the South Essex being pushed back and realises that they need to stand firm to channel the French columns into a killing ground for the Sixth Division. He gets the wavering Light Company to stand their ground, and the French column is crushed. The French withdraw, hoping to cross the bridge at Alba de Tormes and escape. Wellington believes that a Spanish garrison holds the bridge, but the Spanish have fled, believing that the British have been defeated, and the French retreat unopposed.

Lord Spears conducts a solo charge against the fleeing French and is fatally shot. Spears wants Sharpe to tell his sister that he died honourably, but tells Sharpe that he wants to die because he has the Black Lion (syphilis), which results in an ugly death. He tells Sharpe that he knew that Hélène was a French spy and that he had told Hogan this some time ago. Sharpe realises that he is lying and suspects that he is the traitor who stole Hogan's list. He threatens to kill Spears by stabbing him in the back (which would make it seem like he was killed while running away). Spears relents and confesses. He had not sold out Curtis because Leroux already knew, but he did give Leroux the book in which Curtis had written down the details of all his agents. At Spears' request, Sharpe shoots him in the head.

Sharpe, Harper and Hogan pursue the retreating French through the night in an effort to intercept Leroux. In the morning, they catch up to him, but he is able to gain the protection of one of three French infantry squares. The French infantry subsequently ambush a British/King's German Legion cavalry charge against the French cavalry. Against extremely heavy odds, the enraged cavalry succeed in breaking the squares, albeit with heavy casualties.

Sharpe shoots Leroux in the leg, causing him to be thrown from his horse. Leroux refuses to fight, preferring to surrender. Sharpe forces him to fight, threatening to kill him anyway if he does not. In the ensuing sword duel, Sharpe kills Leroux and recovers Leroux's sword and Curtis's book.

La Marquesa is allowed to leave Salamanca, since it is not in the British interest to create a scandal involving a high-ranking Spanish aristocrat. She encounters Sharpe, and is not particularly upset when she learns that Sharpe killed her brother. Sharpe keeps Harper's present, feeling it is lucky, and throws Leroux's sword – which has only been used for evil purposes – into the river.

== Characters in "Sharpe's Sword" ==
- Captain Richard Sharpe – Rifle Captain in the British army, Officer Commanding the Light Company of the South Essex Battalion.
- Sergeant Patrick Harper – one of Sharpe's new group of Rifles, one of the Chosen Men
- Major Michael Hogan – an Engineer, and Wellesley's head of intelligence.
- Lieutenant General Wellington – commander of the British army in Spain.
- Colonel Philippe Leroux – ruthless French officer of Napoleon's imperial guard; sent to Spain as Napoleon's emissary to find El Mirador and to destroy his spy network.
- Hélène Leroux, La Marquesa de Casares el Grande y Melida Sadaba – expatriate French wife to a Spanish aristocrat general, and sister to Colonel Philippe Leroux.
- The Reverend Doctor Patrick Curtis – an expatriate Irish priest and Rector of the Irish College and Professor of Astronomy and Natural History at the University of Salamanca. Known to the Spanish as Don Patricio Cortes. Runs a British spy network covering Spain and France under the code name El Mirador.
- Captain Lord Jack Spears – British cavalry officer, works for Major Hogan as an exploring officer; chronic gambler and womaniser.
- Marshal of France Auguste Marmont – commander of the French army in northern Spain.

== Allusions to actual history ==
References are made to incidents during the Peninsular War and the 1812 Battle of Salamanca. Lieutenant General Wellington, Marshal of France Auguste Marmont, Patrick Curtis, Sergeant Connelley (in charge of the death ward in the novel) and Colquhoun Grant (exploring officer captured by Colonel Leroux) were all based on real historical figures of the same name, with limited dramatic licence taken.

== Adaptations ==
Sharpe's Sword has been adapted for TV as Sharpe's Sword, a 1995 British television drama, part of a series screened on the ITV network. While based on the novel, it is set a year later (1813) than the book and contains several other variations to the novel.

== Publication history ==
- 1983, UK, HarperCollins ISBN 978-0-00-616834-8, Pub date 1983, Paperback
- 1983, UK, HarperCollins ISBN 978-0-00-616834-8, Pub date 18 May 1988, Paperback
- 1983, UK, HarperCollins ISBN 978-0-00-616834-8, Pub date 1994, Paperback
