= Sharpe's Gold =

1981 historical novel by Bernard Cornwell

- First edition
- Author: Bernard Cornwell
- Language: English
- Series: Richard Sharpe stories
- Genre: Historical novels
- Publisher: Collins
- Publication date: December 1981
- Publication place: United Kingdom
- Media type: Print (hardback and paperback) and audio-CD
- Pages: 252 pp (hardcover edition); 256 pp (paperback edition)
- ISBN: 0-00-222129-2 (hardcover edition); ISBN 0-00-616545-1 (paperback edition)
- OCLC: 30778321
- Preceded by: Sharpe's Eagle
- Followed by: Sharpe's Company (publication); Sharpe's Escape (chronological)

Sharpe's Gold is the second (though ninth in chronological order) historical novel in the Richard Sharpe series by Bernard Cornwell first published in 1981. The story is set in August 1810 and features the destruction of Almeida during the Peninsular War.

== Plot summary ==
General Wellington gives Richard Sharpe a crucial secret mission: to retrieve a hoard of Spanish gold he desperately needs to continue fighting the French. The gold is behind enemy lines, in the keeping of Spanish guerrillas led by El Católico, who delights in torturing French prisoners to death. Claud Hardy, one of Major Michael Hogan's exploring officers, was assigned to keep an eye on the guerrillas and the gold after a failed attempt by British cavalry to fetch it. (The wealthy Hardy is the lover of Josefina LaCosta, Sharpe's love interest from Sharpe's Eagle.)

Sharpe sets off with his small company, under the command of Major Kearsey, another exploring officer. Kearsey makes it clear that he believes that the gold belongs to the Spanish and the purpose of the mission is to return it to them. When Kearsey is captured by the French, Sharpe decides to rescue him, as the partisans trust the major. They free not only Kearsey, but also Teresa Moreno and her brother Ramon, the offspring of Cesare Moreno. The elder Moreno led a small group of partisans, but it joined El Católico's larger band. Sharpe is strongly attracted to Teresa, who is betrothed to El Católico.

When Sharpe meets El Católico, the latter admits knowledge of the gold and strongly implies the British intend to take possession of it rather than merely give it to the provisional Spanish government in Cádiz. He claims that he witnessed the French take the gold and capture Captain Hardy. El Católico sends some of his men to escort Sharpe and his men partway back toward British lines, but when they leave, Sharpe doubles back late that night to search a fresh new grave. El Católico is not fooled, and he and his men are waiting for Sharpe. El Católico makes Sharpe keep digging; he finds nothing but a corpse. Patrick Harper, however, sees one of the partisans stick his sword into a large pile of manure nearby. He finds the gold hidden underneath. Sharpe takes Teresa hostage to extricate himself, his men and the gold.

Sharpe and his men are harried by both the partisans and the French. As a result, he no has choice but to try to reach the fortress of Almeida, which is about to be besieged by the French, rather than go directly to Wellington. During this trek, Sharpe and Teresa fall in love. When questioned, she admits that El Católico murdered Hardy (after the latter found El Católico moving the gold) and that her fiancé intends to use it for his own ends.

Sharpe and his men are caught on open ground, about to be overrun by French lancers, but are rescued by a unit of King's German Legion cavalry under Captain Lossow, who was sent by Hogan to search for them. In Almeida, he clashes with the commander of the fortress, the English Brigadier Cox. Sharpe had an order personally written by Wellington, requiring that all officers give Sharpe whatever assistance he requires, but Kearsey had torn it up, so Cox is suspicious of his motives. El Católico, accompanied by some of his men, arrives the same night and lodge a claim for the gold, supposedly as a representative of the Spanish government. Unable to contact Wellington, as the telegraph is destroyed by French artillery before a message can be sent, Cox orders Sharpe to surrender the gold to El Católico and join the garrison.

That night, there is a final showdown between Sharpe and El Católico on the roof of a building adjacent to where the gold is stored. Sharpe, knowing that El Católico is a far superior swordsman, in desperation lets El Católico stab him through the leg with his rapier, but prevents him from extracting the weapon. With El Católico effectively disarmed, Sharpe first knocks him out, then cuts his throat.

This, however, has no bearing on Cox's insistence on giving the gold to the partisans, so in desperation, Sharpe decides to blow up the fortress's magazine. A stray French shell ignites the gunpowder trail he has laid to the magazine. The massive ensuing explosion kills hundreds of the garrison, including Kearsey. With his ammunition gone and part of his fortifications in ruins, Cox is forced to surrender. Sharpe and Lossow depart with their men and the gold before the French forces come to their senses.

Teresa returns to the partisans; with El Católico dead, she is likely to take over command.

When Sharpe delivers the gold (less what he gives Teresa and keeps for himself and his men), he learns that it is to pay for the construction of the enormous defensive lines of Torres Vedras, which form an impregnable barrier between Marshal Masséna's army and Lisbon. Hogan reassures Sharpe that the gold was more necessary to Wellington than Almeida.

Sharpe is granted a month's leave by Wellington, so he takes the opportunity to renew his acquaintance with Josefina LaCosta, who has set herself up in Lisbon as an exclusive courtesan. When she complains after Sharpe chases away her latest client, a wealthy lieutenant, Sharpe laughs and drops gold coins, showing that he has enough of "Sharpe's gold" for her.

== Characters ==
- Richard Sharpe — Captain in the British army, officer of rifles
- Sergeant Patrick Harper — sergeant in the British army, close friend and ally to Sharpe
- Major Michael Hogan – Wellington's intelligence-gathering officer
- Major Kearsey – one of Major Hogan's exploring officers
- Colonel Joaquín 'El Católico' Jovellanos – local partisan commander
- Teresa Moreno — Partisan leader
- Ramon Moreno – Teresa's brother

== References or allusions ==
=== References to actual history, geography and current science ===
Sharpe's story continues to be "intimately linked" with the real-life story of Sir Arthur Wellesley, who appears again in this book. Here the Duke is suffering from money worries as Cornwell states he "knew that money kept an army efficient".

Although El Catolico and his treasure trove are literary inventions, the guerrillas and gold alluded to in this novel were an important part of the war against France ("the twin allies of British victory"); Cornwell admits that the "Sharpe books do not do justice to the guerillas".

The books tells a fictionalised account of the destruction of Almeida which, as Cornwell notes "conveniently for a writer of fiction", remains a mystery. The Lines of Torres Vedras mentioned at the end of the novel are also a historical reality. Both sites were visited by the author during his research for the novel.

=== References in other works ===
The character of Teresa Moreno, who is introduced in this novel, goes on to play an important role in the following books of the series. She and Sharpe become lovers in this novel, though Sharpe's return to Josefina at the end of the novel prompt the reader to speculate on the degree of attraction between him and Teresa.

The characters of Josefina and Claud Hardy were introduced in Cornwell's previous novel Sharpe's Eagle.

The Lines of Torres Vedras are better described in Sharpe's Escape.

== Adaptation ==
A 1995 TV adaptation of the same name was produced by Central Independent Television for the ITV network in the UK starring Sean Bean and Daragh O'Malley although this bore little resemblance to the novel.

== Publication history ==
- 1981, UK, HarperCollins ISBN 0-00-222129-2, 1 December 1981, Hardback
- 1982, USA, Viking Press ISBN 0-670-63943-5, 1 January 1982, Hardback
- 1995, UK, HarperCollins ISBN 0-00-617314-4, 1 December 1995, Paperback
- 2004, USA, Signet ISBN 0-451-21341-6, 3 August 2004, Paperback

This is Bernard Cornwell's second novel and according to the author the hardest to write. It was written as a warm-up for his "series of tales about the adventures of a British rifleman in the Napoleonic Wars". It was published in the same year, and just ten months after, the first novel.
