= Sharpe's Fortress =

1998 historical novel by Bernard Cornwell

- First edition cover
- Author: Bernard Cornwell
- Language: English
- Series: Richard Sharpe
- Genre: Historical novels
- Publisher: HarperCollins
- Publication date: 19 November 1998
- Publication place: United Kingdom
- Media type: Print (hardback and paperback) and audio-CD
- Pages: 301 (hardcover); 368 (paperback)
- ISBN: 0-00-225631-2 (hardcover); ISBN 0-00-651031-0 (paperback)
- OCLC: 41156886
- Preceded by: Sharpe's Triumph
- Followed by: Sharpe's Trafalgar

Sharpe's Fortress is the third historical novel of the Richard Sharpe series, by Bernard Cornwell, first published in 1998. It is the last of the Sharpe India trilogy. It tells the story of Ensign Sharpe, during the battle of Argaum and the following siege of the fortress of Gawilghur in 1803.

== Plot summary ==
Cover of the UK paperback edition

In 1803, Arthur Wellesley's British and sepoy army is in pursuit of the Mahrattas in western India, having beaten them in the Battle of Assaye. Ensign Richard Sharpe, newly made an officer, is beginning to wish he had remained a sergeant, as most of his fellow officers look down upon him, including Captain Urquhart, his commanding officer. Urquhart suggests he sell his commission if he is not happy.

Manu Bappoo, the younger brother of the Rajah of Berar, decides to fight the British again, with his best unit, composed of Arab mercenaries, leading the charge, but he is again routed. During the fighting, Sharpe is impressed by the bravery of a teenage Arab boy, Ahmed, and saves his life when the boy is surrounded. Ahmed becomes his servant.

After the battle, Urquhart recommends Sharpe transfer to the 95th Rifles, an experimental unit, though nothing can be done while the war rages on. For the moment, he assigns Sharpe to assist Captain Torrance, in command of the baggage train. The army is short of many desperately needed supplies, and Sharpe soon discovers why. Lazy and deeply in debt, Torrance has been selling them to the merchant Naig, with the assistance of Sharpe's old nemesis, Sergeant Hakeswill. When Sharpe finds many of the stolen supplies in Naig's tent, Torrance has his associate hanged immediately to avoid being implicated. Jama, Naig's brother, offers to wipe out Torrance's considerable gambling debts in exchange for Sharpe's capture. Hakeswill is only too glad to waylay Sharpe; besides their mutual hatred, he rightly suspects that Sharpe has a fortune in jewels looted from a dead enemy ruler.

Hakeswill ambushes Sharpe and takes him prisoner. He steals all of the jewels Sharpe has hidden on his person, then hands him over to Jama. Fortunately, Ahmed witnesses Sharpe's kidnapping and gets away. By chance, he runs into Sharpe's friend, Syud Sevagee, a Mahratta leader whose goals run parallel to those of the British for now. Sevagee gives Sharpe the opportunity to free himself; Sharpe defeats two of Jama's jettis (religious strongmen). Sharpe decides to let his enemies believe he is dead. Using this ruse, he kills Captain Torrance, making it look like suicide.

The Mahrattas take refuge in Gawilghur, a seemingly impregnable fortress perched high on cliffs above the Deccan Plain. Wellesley has no choice but to attack. Gawilghur is composed of an Outer Fort and an Inner Fort. While the Outer Fort is formidable, the Mahrattas expect the British to take it, though at heavy cost. However, the Inner Fort is so strong, they are confident it cannot fall. Once Wellesley's army has been bled dry trying to capture it, the Mahrattas plan to destroy the survivors.

When two of Hakeswill's henchmen are killed, Hakeswill guesses Sharpe is responsible, so he deserts and finds service with the renegade Englishman William Dodd (whom Sharpe inaccurately believes has murdered a friend, Colonel McCandless) in Gawilghur. It is said that whoever rules Gawilghur, rules India, and Dodd intends for it to be him. When the Outer Fort falls, Dodd keeps the gates of the Inner Fort closed, trapping Manu Bappoo outside to be killed by the British. Dodd also has Hakeswill murder Beny Singh, the weak, pleasure-loving commander of Gawilghur.

Sharpe finds a way into the Inner Fort. One section of the wall is weakly defended because it sits atop a steep cliff. The cliff, however, can be scaled. When Captain Morris, Sharpe's commanding officer, refuses to give him men, Sharpe beats him, then takes charge and leads a group of soldiers up the cliff and over the wall, and helps open the gates. He then finds and confronts Dodd, only to find that Dodd is by far the better swordsman. Dodd slashes Sharpe on his right cheek. Ahmed appears unexpectedly and attacks Dodd. Dodd kills him easily, but Sharpe's cavalryman friend shoots him in the shoulder, and Sharpe kills him.

Hakeswill tries to flee, disguised as a British soldier, but Sharpe finds him. Sharpe forces him to strip, retrieves his stolen jewels, and backs Hakeswill up until he falls into a pit filled with poisonous snakes.

== Characters ==
- Richard Sharpe – an ensign in the British Army
- General Sir Arthur Wellesley – commander of a British army in India
- Obadiah Hakeswill – Sharpe's former sergeant and ongoing nemesis
- Major William Dodd – renegade East India Company officer
- Ahmed – Sharpe's Arab servant
- Syud Sevajee – Mahratta leader allied with the British, and Sharpe's old friend. Sevajee seeks revenge against his father's murderer, Beny Singh, the nominal commander of Gawilghur.

== Releases ==
- 19 November 1998, UK, HarperCollins ISBN 0-00-225631-2, 19 November 1998, hardcover (first edition)
- 1 March 1999, UK, HarperCollins ISBN 0-00-105562-3, audio book cassette
- ? November 1999, UK, Chivers Audio Books ISBN 0-7540-5319-9, audio book CD
- 6 March 2000, UK, HarperCollins ISBN 0-00-651031-0, paperback
- ? June 2005, USA, HarperTorch ISBN 0-06-101271-8, paperback
- 18 April 2006, UK, HarperCollins ISBN 0-00-723505-4, paperback (TV tie-in)
