= Bernard Cornwell bibliography =

Bernard Cornwell's career started in 1981 with Sharpe's Eagle. He has been a prolific historical novelist since then, having published more than 60 novels.

== Novel series ==
=== The Sharpe stories ===
Cornwell's best known books feature the adventures of Richard Sharpe, a British soldier during the Napoleonic Wars.

The first 11 books of the Sharpe series (beginning in chronological order with Sharpe's Rifles and ending with Sharpe's Waterloo, published in the US as Waterloo) detail Sharpe's adventures in various Peninsular War campaigns over the course of 6–7 years. Subsequently, Cornwell wrote a prequel quintet – Sharpe's Tiger, Sharpe's Triumph, Sharpe's Fortress, Sharpe's Trafalgar and Sharpe's Prey – depicting Sharpe's adventures under Wellington's command in India, including his hard-won promotion to the officer corps, his return to Britain and his arrival in the 95th Rifles, and a sequel, Sharpe's Devil, set six years after the end of the wars.

He also wrote Sharpe's Battle, a novel "inserted" into his previous continuity, taking place during the Battle of Fuentes de Oñoro. It has been asserted [unattributed] that Cornwell was initially dubious about the casting of Sean Bean for the television adaptations. However, Cornwell effectively scotches this assertion in an interview with the "CompleatSeanBean" website. Indeed, Cornwell states in the same interview that he "was utterly delighted that it was to be Sean Bean". Cornwell also dedicated Sharpe's Battle to Sean Bean, and has admitted that he subtly changed the writing of the character to align with Bean's portrayal. Since 2003, he has written further "missing adventures" set during the "classic" Peninsular War era.

The following is the correct 'historical' order, although they are all standalone stories:

#	Title	Publisher	Publication date
1	Sharpe's Tiger; Richard Sharpe and the Siege of Seringapatam, 1799	Harper Collins	1997
The first of Richard Sharpe's Indian adventures, pitting him against the Tippoo Sultan in the siege of Seringapatam, 1799.
2	Sharpe's Triumph; Richard Sharpe and the Battle of Assaye, September 1803	Harper Collins	1998
Sharpe, now a sergeant, finds himself alongside Sir Arthur Wellesley at the terrifying Battle of Assaye.
3	Sharpe's Fortress; Richard Sharpe and the Siege of Gawilghur, December 1803	Harper Collins	1998
Sharpe's first story as an officer takes him to the daunting fort of Gawilghur. This is also the last of his Indian adventures.
4	Sharpe's Trafalgar; Richard Sharpe and the Battle of Trafalgar, 1805	Harper Collins	2000
Sharpe has to go home from India, and he would have left in 1805 and Cape Trafalgar lies on his way home, so why should he not be there at the right time?
5	Sharpe's Prey; Richard Sharpe and the Expedition to Copenhagen, 1807	Harper Collins	2001
This tells the tale of one of the most obscure campaigns of the whole of the Napoleonic wars. The Danes had a huge merchant fleet, second only in size to Great Britain's, and to protect it they possessed a formidable navy. But Denmark was a very small country and when, in 1807, the French decide they will invade Denmark and take the fleet for themselves, Britain has to act swiftly. Swiftly, but not particularly justly.
6	Sharpe's Rifles; Richard Sharpe and the French Invasion of Galicia, January 1809	Harper Collins	1988
The beginning of the Peninsular War (the battles between 1808 and 1814 to expel the French from Portugal and Spain). The Peninsular Campaign occupies most of the Sharpe series and this book begins during the infamous retreat to Corunna. Sharpe and a group of the 95th Rifles become separated from the army and are forced to navigate french occupied territory.
7	Sharpe's Havoc; Richard Sharpe and the French Invasion of Portugal, Spring 1809	Harper Collins	2003
Sharpe's Havoc is set during the French invasion of Portugal in 1809 and Sir Arthur Wellesley's devastating counter-attack.
8	Sharpe's Eagle; Richard Sharpe and the Talavera Campaign, July 1809	Harper Collins	1981
It tells the tale of the battle of Talavera.
9	Sharpe's Gold; Richard Sharpe and the Destruction of Almeida, August 1810	Harper Collins	1981
Sharpe is assigned to steal some Spanish gold needed to construct the Lines of Torres Vedras but falls foul of a corrupt Spanish partisan and ends up in the besieged fort of Almeida.
10	Sharpe's Escape; Richard Sharpe and the Bussaco Campaign 1811	Harper Collins	2004
It is the late summer of 1810 and the French mount their third and most threatening invasion of Portugal. Captain Richard Sharpe, with his company of redcoats and riflemen, meets the invaders on the gaunt ridge of Bussaco where, despite a stunning victory, the French are not stopped.
11	Sharpe's Fury; Richard Sharpe and the Battle of Barrosa, March 1811	Harper Collins	2006
Sharpe's Fury is based on the real events of the winter of 1811 that led to the extraordinary victory of Barossa.
12	Sharpe's Battle; Richard Sharpe and the Battle of Fuentes de Onoro, May 1811	Harper Collins	1995
The ghastly tale of the battle of Fuentes d'Onoro, a bloody struggle on the Portuguese frontier which deteriorated into a gutter fight in the narrow alleys of a small village.
13	Sharpe's Company; Richard Sharpe and the Siege of Badajoz, January to April 1812	Harper Collins	1982
Tells the story of the horrifying assault on Badajoz in 1812. The British were in a foul mood, they had been given a hard time by the garrison and suspected that the city's Spanish inhabitants were French sympathisers, so when they got inside they went berserk.
14	Sharpe's Command; Richard Sharpe and the Bridge at Almaraz, May 1812	Harper Collins	2023
Spain, 1812. Richard Sharpe, the most brilliant – but the most wayward – soldier in the British army, finds himself faced with an impossible task. Two French armies march towards each other. If they meet, the British are lost. And only Sharpe – with just his cunning, his courage and a small band of rogues to rely on – stands in their way...'.
15	Sharpe's Sword; Richard Sharpe and the Salamanca Campaign, June and July 1812	Harper Collins	1983
In which Sharpe carries his sword (a 1796 pattern Heavy Cavalry sword, an ill-balanced butcher's blade) to the extraordinary battle outside Salamanca where, to quote an enemy General, Wellington 'destroyed forty thousand Frenchmen in forty minutes'.
16	Sharpe's Skirmish; Richard Sharpe and the defence of the Tormes, August 1812	Sharpe Appreciation Society	2002
(Short Story) It is the summer of 1812 and Richard Sharpe, newly recovered from the wound he received in the fighting at Salamanca, is given an easy duty; to guard a Commissary Officer posted to an obscure Spanish fort where there are some captured French muskets to repair. But unknown to the British, the French are planning a raid and Sharpe is in for a fight!
17	Sharpe's Enemy; Richard Sharpe and the Defense of Portugal, Christmas 1812	Harper Collins	1984
By 1812 a lot of men had deserted from the British, French, Spanish and Portuguese armies and some of them, too many of them, had banded together in the border mountains where they were led by a renegade Frenchman nicknamed Pot-au-Feu. They formed a semi-military group of bandits and their enemies all agreed on one thing – they had to be crushed. Send for Sharpe.
18	Sharpe's Honour; Richard Sharpe and the Vitoria Campaign, February to June 1813	Harper Collins	1985
Pierre Ducos, the French super-agent, tries to end Sharpe's life and the series.
19	Sharpe's Regiment; Richard Sharpe and the Invasion of France, June to November 1813	Harper Collins	1986
Sharpe is sent home to raise soldiers for his regiment, the South Essex, and once in England he runs into an old enemy – Sir Henry Simmerson, once a Colonel of the South Essex and now, what else, a taxman.
20	Sharpe's Christmas; Two short stories, 1813	Sharpe Appreciation Society	2003
Sharpe's Christmas contains two short stories, 'Sharpe's Christmas' and 'Sharpe's Ransom'. 'Sharpe's Christmas' is set in 1813, towards the end of the Peninsular War and falls after Sharpe's Regiment. 'Sharpe's Ransom' comes after Sharpe's Waterloo and is set in peacetime.
21	Sharpe's Storm; Richard Sharpe and the Winter Campaign, 1814	Harper Collins	21 October 2025
War against Napoleon rages across Europe. As Britain prepares to invade France for the first time, the formidable Richard Sharpe and his men brace themselves for a cold, hard winter. Before them, across flooded rivers and fortified bridges, lies the fiercest French army they have ever encountered. There is only one way forward for Wellington's army, and it will be bloody in the toughest winter yet.
22	Sharpe's Siege; Richard Sharpe and the Winter Campaign, 1814	Harper Collins	1987
Sharpe finds himself stranded, surrounded and with only one very unlikely ally – Captain Cornelius Killick from Marblehead, Massachusetts.
23	Sharpe's Revenge; Richard Sharpe and the Peace of 1814	Harper Collins	1989
This takes place between the end of the Peninsular War and the Waterloo Campaign – and Sharpe pursues Ducos to Italy, though not before he's fought in the climactic battle at Toulouse which is Wellington's last victory in the Peninsular War.
24	Sharpe's Waterloo; Richard Sharpe and the Waterloo Campaign, 15 to 18 June 1815, US Title: Waterloo	Harper Collins	1990
The story of the battle – and Sharpe's part in it.
25	Sharpe's Assassin; Richard Sharpe and the Occupation of Paris, 1815	Harper Collins	2021
Sharpe helps the Duke of Wellington root out a group of fanatical post-war revolutionaries in Paris and has to face an assassin bent on killing him.
26	Sharpe's Ransom (short story, 181?, appears in Sharpe's Christmas)	Sharpe Appreciation Society	2003
Sharpe's peaceful life in France is disrupted when an old associate of Ducos, convinced Sharpe has Napoleon's treasure, takes his family hostage and Sharpe has to convince the local villagers to help him.
27	Sharpe's Devil; Richard Sharpe and the Emperor, 1820–1821	Harper Collins	1992
Sharpe, at last, meets Napoleon.

=== The Starbuck Chronicles ===
A tetralogy set during the American Civil War. The title character, Nathaniel Starbuck, is a Northerner who has decided to fight for the South in a Virginian regiment, the Faulconer Legion. The last novel to date in the series has been The Bloody Ground, taking place during the Antietam Campaign. Cornwell has said that he plans to write more Starbuck novels, but has not done so yet.

#	Title	Publisher	Date
1	Rebel	Harper Collins	1993
Nathaniel Starbuck stumbles into the Confederate army and finds himself at the first Bull Run.
2	Copperhead	Harper Collins	1994
Takes Nate Starbuck from Ball's Bluff to the bloody campaign in the peninsula, where the unregarded Robert Lee assumes command of the rebel army.
3	Battle Flag	Harper Collins	1995
Starbuck goes back to Bull Run for the second battle.
4	The Bloody Ground	Harper Collins	1996
The horrors of Antietam.

=== The Warlord Chronicles ===
A trilogy depicting Cornwell's historical re-creation of Arthurian Britain. The series posits that Post-Roman Britain was a difficult time for the native Britons, being threatened by invasion from the Anglo-Saxons in the East and raids from the Irish in the West. At the same time, they suffered internal power struggles between their petty kingdoms and friction between the old Druidic religion and newly arrived Christianity.

#	Title	Publisher	Date
1	The Winter King	Penguin Group	1995
After the death of Uther, High King of Britain, the country falls into chaos. Uther's heir is a child, Mordred, and Arthur, his uncle, is named one of the boy's guardians. Arthur has to fight other British kingdoms and the dreadful "Sais" – the Saxons – who are invading Britain.
2	Enemy of God	Penguin Group	1996
At the end of The Winter King Arthur fought the battle that forces unity on the warring British kingdoms and now he sets out to face the real enemy – the Saxons.
3	Excalibur: A Novel of Arthur	Penguin Group	1997
In Excalibur we follow Arthur and Derfel to the battle of Mount Badon and incredible victory. It not only throws the Saxons back, but reunites Arthur and Guinevere. He might hope now to be left alone, to have a time of peace after gaining a great victory, but new enemies arise to destroy all he has achieved.

=== The Grail Quest novels ===
A series that deals with a mid-14th century search for the Holy Grail during the Hundred Years' War. An English archer, Thomas of Hookton, becomes drawn into the quest by the actions of a mercenary soldier called "The Harlequin," who murders Thomas's family in his own obsessive search for the Grail. Cornwell was planning at one point to write more books about the main character Thomas of Hookton and said that shortly after finishing Heretic he had "... started another Thomas of Hookton book, then stopped it – mainly because I felt that his story ended in Heretic and I was just trying to get too much from him. Which doesn't mean I won't pick the idea up again sometime in the future."

#	Title	Publisher	Date
1	Harlequin; US: The Archer's Tale	Harper Collins	2000
The bastard son of a priest, Thomas leaves his native Dorset, seeking revenge after French raiders destroy his village and kill his father. He becomes a mercenary archer, fighting with the English in France. He participates in the Battle of Crécy in 1346 at the beginning stages of what would become known as the Hundred Years' War. He comes to discover that his father was not merely a simple priest, but a French count hiding from his heretical family, and that family is rumoured to have once possessed the Holy Grail. He is skeptical, but powerful people will go to any lengths to find it.
2	Vagabond	Harper Collins	2002
Thomas of Hookton has been sent back to England to pursue his father's mysterious legacy which hints that the Holy Grail might exist and gets tangled with the Scottish invasion of 1347. He survives that only to discover that various powerful folk in France are pursuing the same quest, a complication that takes Thomas back to Brittany and the fighting about La Roche-Derrien.
3	Heretic	Harper Collins	2003
Thomas of Hookton travels south into Gascony and to a final confrontation with his cousin, Guy Vexille. The novel begins with the fall of Calais in 1347, and most of the events occur in the subsequent truce, but for Thomas and his companions there can be no truce, only a vicious small war which ends with them being besieged, not just by enemies intent on finding the grail, but by the Black Death.
4	1356	Harper Collins	2012
Thomas of Hookton leads a company of mercenary archers who ravage the countryside of Gascony. Hookton must complete a crucial task before joining the Black Prince's army to fight at the Battle of Poitiers (1356).

=== The Saxon Stories ===
Cornwell's latest series focuses on the Anglo-Saxon kingdom of Wessex, England during the 9th-century reign of Alfred the Great, his fierce opposition to the Danes and his determination to unite England as one country.

#	Title	Publisher	Date
1	The Last Kingdom	Harper Collins	2004
Uhtred is an English boy, born into the aristocracy of 9th century Northumbria, but orphaned at ten, adopted by a Dane and taught the Viking ways. Yet Uhtred's fate is indissolubly bound up with Alfred, King of Wessex, who rules over the last English kingdom when the Danes have overrun Northumbria, Mercia and East Anglia.
2	The Pale Horseman	Harper Collins	2005
Describes the fateful year in which the Danes capture Alfred's kingdom and drive him as a fugitive into the marshes of Athelney. It seems that Wessex, and England, are destroyed, but Alfred is determined to make one desperate gamble that might save his kingdom.
3	The Lords of the North	Harper Collins	2006
Uhtred, having helped Alfred secure Wessex as an independent Saxon kingdom, returns north in an attempt to find his stepsister. Instead he discovers chaos, civil war and treachery in Northumbria. He takes the side of Guthred, once a slave and now a man who would be king, and in return expects Guthred's help in capturing Dunholm, the lair of the dark Viking lord, Kjartan.
4	Sword Song	Harper Collins	2007
Wessex, Alfred's kingdom, has survived the great Viking assaults and now, with Uhtred as a leader, the West Saxon forces begin the campaigns of conquest that will end with a new kingdom called England.
5	The Burning Land	Harper Collins	2009
Tells of the final assaults on Alfred's Wessex.
6	Death of Kings	Harper Collins	2011
Tells of the years which followed the death of Alfred the Great as two men struggle to inherit the crown of Wessex. Uhtred has to contend with betrayal, treachery and the largest army the Danes have yet assembled to conquer Wessex, all brought to a climax in a winter battle fought in the fens of East Anglia.
7	The Pagan Lord	Harper Collins	26 September 2013
The years after King Alfred’s death are peaceful: the Danes rule in northern Britain, the Saxons hold the south. But for a warrior, a time of restless peace is the hardest challenge. Too often, it allows the cautious and the timid to dominate.
8	The Empty Throne	Harper Collins	23 October 2014
The forces of Wessex and Mercia have united against the Danes, but instability and the threat of Viking raids still hang heavy over Britain’s kingdoms. For Aethelred, Lord of the Mercians, is dying, leaving no heir and the stage is set for rivals to fight for the throne.
9	Warriors of the Storm	Harper Collins	8 October 2015
The Northmen invade from Ireland, led by a fierce Viking warrior, Ragnall Iverson. He must face defender Uhtred, fighting to defend lands ruled by King Edward and his sister Aethelflaed.
10	The Flame Bearer	Harper Collins	6 October 2016
Britain is in a state of uneasy peace. Northumbria’s Viking ruler, Sigtryggr, and Mercia’s Saxon Queen Aethelflaed have agreed a truce. And so England’s greatest warrior, Uhtred of Bebbanburg, at last has the chance to take back the home his traitorous uncle stole from him so many years ago and which his scheming cousin still occupies.
11	War of the Wolf	Harper Collins	4 October 2018
Uhtred has been summoned to attend a Witan at Tamweorthin (Tamworth). He obeys the summons even though he knows one of his bitterest enemies, Ealdorman Aethelhelm, will try to have him killed.
12	Sword of Kings	Harper Collins	3 October 2019
Off Bebbanburg fishermen and their boats are disappearing. As their lord, Uhtred has a responsibility to deal with the issue, so he sets sail and sets a trap.
13	War Lord	Harper Collins	15 October 2020
On 5 March 2020 Cornwell announced on his Facebook page that the 13th novel will be titled War Lord and will be the final book in the series. Northumbria, under a weak king, is threatened on all sides. Uhtred is forced to choose who to support.

=== Thrillers ===
Cornwell's thrillers are modern mysteries, all with sailing themes. He is a traditional sailor and enjoys sailing his Cornish Crabber by the name of Royalist. His thorough knowledge of sailing and popular skills with writing combine in great novels for the nautically obsessed. According to Cornwell's website, there may be no additions to the series: "I enjoyed writing the thrillers, but suspect I am happier writing historical novels. I'm always delighted when people want more of the sailing books, but I'm not planning on writing any more, at least not now – but who knows? perhaps when I retire."

Title	Publisher	Date
Wildtrack	Penguin Group	1988
A crippled veteran of the Falklands War sails into the north Atlantic to discover whether a famous television presenter is a murderer.
Sea Lord US: Killer's Wake	Penguin Group	1989
An eccentric and reluctant aristocrat just wants to be left alone to be a sea-gypsy, but a theft from his ancestral home hauls him back to Britain and mayhem.
Crackdown	Penguin Group	1990
A convalescent cruise in the Bahamas turns murderous with cocaine.
Stormchild	Penguin Group	1991
Can our hero save the world from the environmentalists? Someone has to.
Scoundrel	Penguin Group	1992
A man goes home to Cape Cod to escape a world of European treachery and his involvement with the Provisional IRA. Others have different plans for him.

=== Other standalone novels ===
Title	Publisher	Date
Redcoat	Michael Joseph Ltd.	1987
Redcoat is the story of the Valley Forge winter during the American Revolution – told from the redcoat's point of view.
Stonehenge	Harper Collins	1999
A story of love, rivalry, treachery and a great mysterious temple set in the year 2000 BC.
Gallows Thief	Harper Collins	2001
Gallows Thief is a detective story, set in Regency London, a time when there were no detectives as such. There was a very busy gallows, however. This was a period when the English and Welsh gallows were at their busiest and, very occasionally, the government appointed an 'Investigator' to look into a conviction.
Azincourt US: Agincourt	Harper Collins	2008
Azincourt is the tale of Nicholas Hook, an archer, who begins the novel by joining the garrison of Soissons, a city whose patron saints were Crispin and Crispinian. What happened at Soissons shocked all Christendom, but in the following year, on the feast day of Crispin and Crispinian, Hook finds himself in that small army trapped at Azincourt. The novel is the story of the archers who helped win a battle that has entered legend, but in truth is a tale, as Sir John Keegan says, 'of slaughter-yard behaviour and outright atrocity'.
The Fort	Harper Collins	2010
The Fort is about the Penobscot Expedition of 1779. A small British garrison was established in what is now Maine (then part of Massachusetts). Seven hundred British redcoats were in an unfinished fort, Fort George, while the harbour beneath the fort was guarded by three sloops-of-war. Against this the rebel government in the State of Massachusetts sent an army of around 900 men and a fleet of 42 ships, half of which were warships, with orders to 'captivate, kill or destroy' the invaders.
Fools and Mortals	Harper Collins	2017
The Elizabethan world of William Shakespeare and particularly his brother Richard is the backdrop for a world of scheming and drama.

== Non-fiction ==
Cornwell published a nonfiction book, Waterloo: The History of Four Days, Three Armies and Three Battles, released in September 2014, timely for the 200th anniversary of that battle.

Waterloo: The History of Four Days, Three Armies and Three Battles September 2014 ISBN 000753938X / 9780007539383 (UK edition) Publisher William Collins

== Bibliography ==
Year	Title	Notes
1981	Sharpe's Eagle	
1981	Sharpe's Gold	
1982	Sharpe's Company	
1983	Sharpe's Sword	
1983	Sharpe's Enemy	
1983	A Crowning Mercy	With Susannah Kells, the pseudonym of Judy Cornwell, Bernard Cornwell's wife
1984	Fallen Angels	With Susannah Kells, the pseudonym of Judy Cornwell, Bernard Cornwell's wife
1985	Sharpe's Honour	
1986	Sharpe's Regiment	
1986	Coat of Arms	aka The Aristocrats, with Susannah Kells, the pseudonym of Judy Cornwell, Bernard Cornwell's wife
1987	Sharpe's Siege	
1987	Redcoat	
1988	Sharpe's Rifles	
1988	Wildtrack	
1989	Sharpe's Revenge	
1989	Sea Lord	aka Killer's Wake
1990	Sharpe's Waterloo	
1990	Crackdown	
1991	Stormchild	
1992	Sharpe's Devil	
1992	Scoundrel	
1993	Rebel	
1994	Copperhead	
1995	Sharpe's Battle	
1995	Battle Flag	
1995	The Winter King	
1996	The Bloody Ground	
1996	Enemy of God	
1997	Sharpe's Tiger	
1997	Excalibur: A Novel of Arthur	
1998	Sharpe's Triumph	
1999	Sharpe's Fortress	
1999	Stonehenge: A Novel of 2000 BC	
2000	Harlequin	aka The Archer's Tale
2001	Sharpe's Trafalgar	
2001	Gallows Thief	
2002	Sharpe's Prey	
2002	Sharpe's Skirmish	Short story, revised from 1999 version issued as a promotional item with UK edition of Sharpe's Fortress
2002	Vagabond	
2003	Sharpe's Havoc	
2003	Sharpe's Christmas	Short story
2003	Heretic	
2004	Sharpe's Escape	
2004	The Last Kingdom	
2005	The Pale Horseman	
2006	Sharpe's Fury	
2006	The Lords of the North	
2007	Sword Song	
2008	Azincourt	US title: Agincourt
2009	The Burning Land	
2010	The Fort	
2011	Death of Kings	
2012	1356	
2013	The Pagan Lord	
2014	Waterloo: The History of Four Days, Three Armies and Three Battles	
2014	The Empty Throne	
2015	Warriors of the Storm	
2016	The Flame Bearer	
2017	Fools and Mortals	
2018	War of the Wolf	
2019	Sword of Kings	
2020	War Lord	
2021	Sharpe's Assassin	
2023	Sharpe's Command	
2025	Sharpe's Storm	
