= The Pale Horseman =

2005 historical novel by Bernard Cornwell

- First edition cover
- Author: Bernard Cornwell
- Language: English
- Series: The Saxon Stories
- Genre: Historical novel
- Published: 3 October 2005
- Publisher: HarperCollins
- Publication place: United Kingdom
- Media type: Print (hardback, paperback) and audio book
- Pages: 400 (hardback)
- ISBN: 0-00-714992-1 (first, hardback edition)
- OCLC: 60667779
- Preceded by: The Last Kingdom
- Followed by: The Lords of the North

The Pale Horseman is the second historical novel in The Saxon Stories by Bernard Cornwell, published in 2005. It is set in 9th century Wessex and Cornwall.

== Plot summary ==
During 877, the 20-year-old Lord Uhtred of Bebbanburg arrives at King Alfred of Wessex's court to proclaim the defeat of the forces of Danish chieftain and warrior Ubba Lothbrokson, as well as his killing of Ubba himself in single combat, only to find that his enemy Ealdorman Odda the Younger has lied, denying he had any part in the great victory. Uhtred is so enraged, he draws his sword in the king's presence, and is forced to do penance. This strengthens Alfred's dislike and distrust of him.

Alfred makes peace with the Danish king Guthrum rather than take advantage of the victory, much to Uhtred's disgust. Uhtred goes home, but eventually becomes bored and goes off raiding into Cornwall. He comes across a settlement ruled by Peredur, who hires Uhtred and his men to fight an enemy. Only later does Uhtred realize he has been tricked; his opponent is not some half-trained gang, but rather the Dane Svein of the White Horse and his band of seasoned warriors. Uhtred and Svein ally, kill Peredur and pillage his settlement. Uhtred carries off one of Peredur's wives, the shadow queen Iseult, who is believed to have supernatural powers. A monk named Asser, who was at Peredur's court, witnesses the betrayal and escapes. Uhtred and Svein then part ways. On his way home, Uhtred captures a Danish ship laden with treasure. He returns to his estate and pious wife Mildrith, using his share of the treasure to build a great hall and pay his large debt to the Church.

The Witan summons Uhtred to an audience with King Alfred in Cippanhamm, where he is accused, based on the testimony of Asser, of using the king's ship to raid the Britons, with whom Wessex is at peace, and joining Svein in attacking the Cynuit abbey. Steapa Snotor, one of Odda the Younger's warriors, says he too saw Uhtred at the abbey. They decide to settle the dispute with a trial by combat to the death between Uhtred and Steapa. The duel is cut short when Guthrum breaks his word and launches a surprise attack. Everyone flees. Uhtred, Leofric, and Iseult hide in the fields until nightfall, when they enter Cippanhamm and rescue a friend, the whore Eanflæd. The four of them wander for a few weeks until they reach the swamps of Athelney.

At the edge of the marsh, Uhtred rescues a monk from Guthrum's men, only to discover that the monk is actually Alfred. After praying while Uhtred briefly consorts with childhood friends, the distraught King Alfred considers going into exile, but with Uhtred's encouragement, decides to stay and fight. For a few months, they hide in the swamp, spreading the word that Alfred is still alive; slowly men come to join them early in 878.

When Svein anchors his fleet at the mouth of the River Parret close to their hideout, Uthred tricks the men Svein left to guard his ships and burns all but one. Without his ships, Svein is forced to join his rival, Guthrum. This is what Alfred wants: an opportunity for one decisive battle against both Danish invaders.

Alfred raises those fyrds that have remained loyal, but is still outnumbered. Furthermore, all of the Danes are trained warriors, while only a portion of Alfred's men are. Nevertheless, they win the Battle of Ethandun, with the 21-year-old Uhtred playing a pivotal role, and Alfred's kingdom is saved. The victory comes at the cost of Leofric and Iseult, both of whom are killed in the battle.

== Characters ==
- Uhtred – the protagonist, narrator
- King Alfred of Wessex (Alfred the Great) – the King of Wessex
- Leofric – Captain of the Heahengel, one of the ships of Wessex
- Iseult – A Briton shadow queen from Cornwall
- Father Beocca – Priest and family friend
- Guthrum the Unlucky – Danish king
- Svein of the White Horse – Danish chieftain
- Haesten – Captured Dane freed by Uhtred, later joins Guthrum. Haesten is a historical character.
- Ragnar Ragnarsson – Uthred's adopted older brother
- Odda the Younger – Son of Odda the Elder, Ealdorman of Defnascir
- Steapa Snotor (the Clever) – Odda the Younger's bodyguard
- Father Pyrlig – A Welsh priest and former warrior
- Ælswith – Alfred's wife who dislikes Uhtred
- Eanflæd – whore rescued by Uhtred in Cippanhamm
- Æthelflæd – Alfred's daughter
- Æthelwold – Alfred's nephew and friend of Uhtred
- Hild – Nun rescued at Alfred's behest in Cippanhamm
- Mildrith – Uhtred's pious West Saxon wife
- Brother Asser – Welsh monk and enemy of Uhtred

== Release details ==
- 2005, UK, HarperCollins ISBN 0-00-714992-1, Pub date 3 October 2005, hardback
- 2005, UK, HarperCollins ISBN 0-00-721098-1, Pub date 3 October 2005, audio cassette (Kati Nicholl editor, Jamie Glover narrator)
- 2005, UK, HarperCollins ISBN 0-00-721099-X, Pub date 3 October 2005, audio CD (Kati Nicholl editor, Jamie Glover narrator)
- 2006, UK, HarperLargePrint ISBN 0-06-087892-4, Pub date ? January 2006, paperback (large print)
- 2006, UK, HarperCollins ISBN 0-00-714993-X, Pub date 22 May 2006, paperback (forthcoming edition)

== See also ==
- Four Horsemen of the Apocalypse § White Horse
