= The Burning Land =

2009 historical novel by Bernard Cornwell

- First edition cover
- Author: Bernard Cornwell
- Original title: The Burning Land
- Language: English
- Series: The Saxon Stories
- Genre: historical novel
- Publisher: HarperCollins
- Publication date: 2009
- Publication place: United Kingdom
- Media type: Print (hardback & paperback)
- Pages: 366 first edition, hardback
- ISBN: 978-0-00-721975-9 (first edition, hardback)
- Preceded by: Sword Song
- Followed by: Death of Kings

The Burning Land is the fifth historical novel in The Saxon Stories by Bernard Cornwell, published in 2009. The story is set in the 9th-century Anglo-Saxon kingdoms of Wessex, Northumbria and Mercia. The first half of season 3 of the British television series The Last Kingdom is based on this novel.

Uhtred of Bebbanburg wins a victory against Danish invaders threatening Alfred the Great's kingdom of Wessex. When Uhtred unintentionally kills a Christian priest who insulted his dead wife, Alfred demands heavy reparations of Uhtred. Instead, Uthred breaks his oath to Alfred and sets off Viking, but eventually returns to Mercia because of his oath to Aethelflaed, Alfred's daughter, and ends the (immediate) Danish threat.

This novel, and the series of which it is the fifth part, has been well received. One reviewer remarks "Vivid descriptions of merciless battlefield slaughter, rape, and destruction are artfully related by a masterful storyteller." Another comments on the series and its viewpoint varying from the Anglo-Saxon Chronicle, saying "Historical novels stand or fall on detail, and Mr Cornwell writes as if he has been to ninth-century Wessex and back." Another again praises Cornwell's eye for historical detail, and "his capacity for pulling off deft reverses are still in place, which helps to keep the narrative turning briskly along."

== Plot summary ==
892–893: Uhtred of Bebbanburg is now the preeminent warlord of Wessex, Alfred the Great's kingdom. Alfred, always in poor health and now fearing he is dying, pressures him to swear an oath to Alfred's son and presumptive heir, Edward. Uhtred is unwilling to do so, as that would interfere with his goal of retaking his family's stronghold at Bebbanburg in Northumbria, stolen from him by his uncle Aelfric after his father's death.

Uhtred is military governor of Lundene (London), sharing power with Bishop Erkenwald, whom he dislikes, but respects. Wessex is threatened by two separate Danish forces who land in Cent (Kent). Uhtred delivers Alfred's bribe to Jarl (Earl) Haesten, who leads the smaller army, to get him to leave, so that he can deal with the more serious threat posed by Jarl Harald Bloodhair. Uhtred objects to the bribe, as he knows that Haesten is completely untrustworthy. While travelling to meet Alfred, Uhtred captures Skade, Harald's woman and a reputed sorceress. Harald arrives, leading Saxon captive women, and threatens to kill all of them if Skade is not returned to him. When he starts butchering his prisoners before Uhtred's eyes, Uhtred releases Skade. Skade curses Uhtred as she and Harald make their escape.

Uhtred devises a plan to lure Harald into a trap. The plan works brilliantly. Uhtred and Alfred's men rout Harald's forces and again take Skade prisoner. Harald is severely wounded, but escapes to Torneie Island (Thorney Island), with a few followers. The island's natural defences and a palisade he builds make it too costly to attack him, but he is trapped there.

Uhtred is devastated by the news that his beloved wife, Gisela, has died in childbirth, along with the newborn child. When Uhtred and Skade return to Lundene, the cleric Godwin denounces Gisela, ranting that Gisela was the devil's whore and has come back from the dead as Skade. Uhtred flies into a rage and strikes him, unintentionally killing him. As punishment, Alfred orders Uhtred to pay a huge fine and swear an oath to Edward. Alfred holds Uhtred's children hostage and places them in the custody of Aethelflaed, his daughter and wife of Aethelred, the ealdorman of Mercia. Furious, Uhtred breaks his oath to Alfred and sails with Skade to Dunholm in Northumbria, stronghold of his old friend Ragnar, a Danish leader. Uhtred trusts Aethelflaed to protect his children.

Uhtred needs money to recruit men to attack Bebbanburg. Skade claims that Skirnir, her hated husband and a Frisian pirate, has a great treasure hoard, so Uhtred sails to Frisia. On the voyage, he and Skade become lovers. After he defeats and kills Skirnir, he is disappointed when the hoard fails to match Skade's description. When Skade demands half of it as her share, Uhtred denies it to her. Skade becomes his bitter enemy.

Ragnar and two other powerful Northumbrian jarls, Cnut and Sigrid, plot to attack Wessex. During the meeting, an uninvited Haesten arrives and offers to attack Mercia first, to distract Alfred and draw away some of his forces. When Haesten leaves, Skade goes with him. Uhtred's friend, the Welshman Father Pyrlig, arrives. Pyrlig reminds Uhtred that he has given his oath to serve Aethelflaed, and "oaths made in love cannot be broken".

Aethelred, Aethelflaed's husband, wants to divorce her to break free of Alfred's domination of Mercia. He directs Lord Aldhelm to rape Aethelflaed, which would give Aethelred the excuse of "adultery" to divorce her. Uhtred kills Aldhelm and is reunited with his children and Aethelflaed. He and Aethelflaed then go to Aethelred's council, surprising him before the assembled Mercian lords. Uhtred tries to convince the Mercian lords to adopt his war plan, asking them to bring their men to Lundene. Because Aethelred holds the purse-strings, only Lord Elfwold comes. Uhtred and Aethelflaed become lovers. Uhtred learns that Alfred had advised Aethelflaed to use Uhtred's oath to her to bring him back. Eventually, Steapa, Alfred's retainer and Uhtred's friend, brings an army of twelve hundred of Alfred's best house troops, along with Edward.

With these reinforcements, Uhtred decides to attack Haesten's two forts at Baemfleot (Benfleet), although Haesten is not there. Uhtred encounters and recklessly attacks a larger Danish force. Surrounded, he is saved by Steapa's timely arrival with Alfred's troops. The Danes are routed, and some flee to the weaker fort. The gate is left open for the fleeing Danes, and Uhtred's men get inside and capture the fort. The second fort is much tougher, but Uhtred takes it too, throwing beehives inside to distract the defenders at a key point.

In the hall, Uhtred finds Skade and a hoard of treasure. Harald Bloodhair, crippled and vengeful over Skade's betrayal with Haesten, appears, embraces her, then kills her. He then asks Uhtred to kill him. Uhtred does, then meets with Edward, who says that he does not need Uhtred's oath as long as his sister has it. Uhtred and Aethelflaed then sail away.

== Characters ==
=== Fictional ===
- Uhtred Ragnarson, the protagonist and narrator, dispossessed Ealdorman of Bebbanburg
- Gisela – Uhtred's wife
- Stiorra – Uhtred's daughter
- Uhtred Uhtredson – Uhtred's son
- Osbert – Uhtred's youngest child
- Steapa Snotor – A huge, fierce Saxon warrior, captain of Alfred's house troops
- Father Willibald – A British priest and friend of Uhtred
- Father Pyrlig – A Welsh priest and warrior who is a close friend of Uhtred
- Sihtric Kjartanson – Kjartan's illegitimate son, sworn to Uhtred
- Father Beocca – Uhtred's friend and teacher
- Osferth – Alfred's illegitimate son, now a member of Uhtred's household troops
- Ralla – Uthred's shipmaster
- Finan (the Agile) – Irish ex-slave, Uhtred's close friend and captain of Uhtred's household troops
- Rypere – A Saxon, one of Uhtred's household troops and oath-men
- Cerdic – One of Uhtred's household troops and oath-men
- Ragnar Ragnarson – Jarl of Dunholm (Durham), blood-brother to Uhtred
- Brida – Ragnar's East Anglian wife
- Rollo – Oath-man of Ragnar, fought with Uhtred in Frisia
- Jarl Harald Bloodhair – Danish earl, initially Skade's lover, enemy of Alfred and Uhtred
- Skade – Danish woman, wife of Skirnir, at various times Uhtred's lover and enemy
- Offa – A Saxon, formerly a priest, now ostensibly an entertainer with trained dogs, but in reality a purveyor of information
- Aelfric of Bebbanburg – Uhtred's uncle, possessor of Bebbanburg, (Bamburgh Castle) Uhtred's hereditary home.
- Skirnir – Frisian chieftain and pirate, husband of Skade
- Brother Godwin – A blind monk, beholden to Bishop Asser and claimed to speak directly with God
- Aldhelm – Mercian lord, underling of Aethelred
- Guthlac – Reeve of Dumnoc (Dunwich, Suffolk)

=== Historical ===
- King Alfred of Wessex (Alfred the Great) – King of Wessex
- Aelswith – A Mercian princess in her own right, wife of King Alfred, mother of Aethelflaed and Edward
- Bishop Asser – Welsh monk, religious advisor to King Alfred, enemy of Uhtred
- Aethelflaed – King Alfred's daughter and wife to Athelred
- Aethelred – Ealdorman of Mercia, Alfred's son-in-law and Uhtred's cousin
- Edward Aethling – Alfred's son and heir apparent to the throne of Wessex
- Earl Haesten – A Danish jarl (earl), who previously broke a life-oath to Uhtred who is now a dangerous enemy, seemingly based on a Viking leader of the same name recorded in the Anglo-Saxon Chronicle
- Erkenwald – Alfred's civilian ruler of Lunden; Uhtred rules the garrison. Seemingly based on St. Erkenwald, an Anglo-Saxon bishop of London, who lived two centuries prior to the events of this novel.
- Eohric of East Anglia – Danish king of East Anglia, Alfred's weak ally
- Constantin – Prince of Alba (Scotland) under King Domnal. Later to become King Constantine II of Alba

== Lists ==
On 31 October 2009, the book was number 5 on the hardback best-seller list of the Evening News (Edinburgh, Scotland)

== Reviews ==
Publishers Weekly finds the action-packed novel to be artfully related by a masterful storyteller.

Tom Shippey has strong praise in a detailed review of this novel, praise for the series, for this novel's portrayal of ninth-century Wessex, and for filling a gap in the written records, records written by Alfred's supporters.

Curtis Edmonds is pleased with the development of Uhtred, the main character. While wishing Uhtred could stop being used by so many larger forces and instead follow his own desires, Edmonds knows that would be the end of The Saxon Tales, and there are more tales to tell.

== Adaptation ==
This novel is the basis for the first half of season 3 of The Last Kingdom.
