= Warriors of the Storm =

2015 historical novel by Bernard Cornwell

- First edition cover
- Author: Bernard Cornwell
- Language: English
- Series: The Saxon Stories
- Genre: Historical novel
- Publisher: HarperCollins
- Publication date: 8 October 2015
- Publication place: United Kingdom
- Media type: Print (hardback)
- Pages: 320 (hardback edition)
- ISBN: 978-0-00-750407-7 (first, hardback edition)
- Preceded by: The Empty Throne
- Followed by: The Flame Bearer

Warriors of the Storm is the ninth historical novel in The Saxon Stories series by Bernard Cornwell, first published in October 2015. It is set in 10th-century Mercia, Northumbria and Northern Ireland and continues to follow the fortunes of the fictional Uhtred of Bebbanburg.

== Plot ==
Northmen led by Ragnall Ivarson invade Mercia near Uhtred's fortress of Ceaster. Ragnall, whose brother Sigtryggr is married to Uhtred's daughter Stiorra, has been driven out of Ireland by the natives to seek less fiercely defended lands. Ragnall's supporters include Jarl Haesten, Uhtred's longtime foe, as well as a single crew of Irishmen led by Conall, the brother of Finan, Uhtred's second-in-command.

Æthelflaed, the ruler of Mercia, brings reinforcements. Ragnall captures the partially built burh of Eads Byrig and demands they cede Ceaster to him, but Uhtred knows Ceaster's fortifications are very strong. Then Ragnall unexpectedly turns north to seize the bordering kingdom of Northumbria from its weak king, his plan all along. Uhtred guesses his intention and mauls Ragnall's rearguard, but is initially happy to see Ragnall leave Mercia.

Haesten, left in charge of Ragnall's garrison at Eads Byrig, bargains with Æthelflaed to surrender to her, claiming he and most of his men are Christians, but Uhtred realises he is only buying time for Ragnall to recruit Northumbrian warriors to lead back into Mercia. Uhtred attacks and captures Eads Byrig. He then orders Æthelstan to fight Haesten, over Æthelflaed and her priests' objections. Uhtred proves that Haesten lied about everything, then has Æthelstan finish him off.

Ragnall returns in a few days with an enlarged army. In revenge for his 43 men killed at Eads Byrig, he kills 42 captives within sight of Uhtred, then gives him one alive: Uhtred's elder, estranged son, Father Oswald. Oswald has been completely emasculated by Brida, Uhtred's first lover, now his bitter foe. Uhtred, with Æthelflaed's reluctant authorisation, launches a surprise attack and catches Ragnall's men unprepared, killing hundreds of enemy warriors and capturing many horses, women and children. Harassed by raiding parties, Ragnall splits his force in two. The smaller part heads north, probably to Eoferwick to ensure that Northumbria stays firmly under Ragnall's control, while Ragnall himself leads the rest deeper into Mercia to placate his men after his setbacks with plundering and pillaging.

Having received word that his daughter Stiorra and son-in-law Sigtryggr are besieged because they did not support Ragnall's invasion, Uhtred takes a couple of days to sail to Ireland and rescue them, disobeying Æthelflaed's orders. Uhtred offers to make Sigtryggr king of Northumbria, in part to further his own lifelong ambition of regaining Bebbanburg.

They head toward Eoforwik, sneaking in by pretending to bring Stiorra (whom Ragnall wants for his fifth wife) in as a prisoner. They find Brida in charge. She is waging war against Christianity, and they are horrified to see 34 people crucified. Uhtred overthrows her and lets Stiorra kill Brida. They also free hostages Ragnall has taken to ensure allied jarls remain loyal to him.

Uhtred then takes his men in search of Ragnall, sending word to Æthelflaed, asking her to bring her forces and hopefully trap Ragnall's army between them. However, her field commander does not do as Uhtred wants, and Uhtred finds himself trapped and greatly outnumbered in the ruins of an old Roman fort. Before the battle, Finan goes out to challenge his brother to a duel. First, he kills Conall's huge champion easily. Then he confronts his brother. When Conall refuses to fight, Finan turns his back. Conall attacks, but Finan is prepared and bests (but does not kill) his brother. He turns his back again, with the same result. This time Finan takes Conall's crown, before riding the length of the enemy line and heading back. Next, Uhtred has Sigtryggr bring out and set free the eight women Ragnall had taken hostage. These two actions undermine Ragnall's authority. So when Ragnall orders his men to advance, only about half do so. Seeing this, Uhtred orders his own men to charge out of their fortifications, yelling the silly war cry, "For Mus, the best whore in Britain! For Mus!" His men laugh and follow him. This does the trick. Most of Ragnall's men turn against him, and he is defeated and killed.

== Characters ==
=== Fictional ===
- Uhtred of Bebbanburg – the protagonist, dispossessed Ealdorman of Bebbanburg, narrator
- Finan the Agile – Irish slave and warrior Uhtred has befriended
- Osferth – Aethelflaed and Edward's illegitimate elder brother
- Uhtred Uhtredson – Uthred's younger son, originally named Osbert
- Father Oswald – Uthred's elder son, named Uthred before being disinherited, named Judas by Uhtred.
- Stiorra – Uthred's daughter, married to Sigtryggr Ivarsson
- Brida – Former lover of Uhtred. Ally to Ragnall Ivarsson. Lady of Dunholme and widow to Ragnar.
- Berg – One of Uhtred's best warriors. Saved from execution by Uhtred as a boy in Wales.
- Eadith – Uhtred's lover. Former lover of Æthelred.

=== Historical ===
- Æthelflæd – King Alfred's daughter and widow to Athelred
- King Edward – King Alfred's son and King of Wessex
- Æthelstan – eldest son of King Edward by his first wife, Ecgwynn
- Earl Haesten – A Danish Jarl (earl), who previously broke a life-oath to Uhtred who is now a dangerous enemy, seemingly based on a Viking leader of the same name recorded in the Anglo-Saxon Chronicle
- Ragnall Ivarson
- Sigtryggr Ivarsson
- Bishop Leofstan – Newly appointed Bishop of Chester.

== Reviews ==
Kirkus refers to this addition to the series as "sometimes ribald, but always smartly done". It then suggests fans might be disappointed by its lack of length.
