= Sword Song (Cornwell novel) =

2007 historical novel by Bernard Cornwell

- First edition cover
- Author: Bernard Cornwell
- Cover artist: Larry Rostant
- Language: English
- Series: The Saxon Stories
- Genre: Historical novel
- Publisher: HarperCollins
- Publication date: September 2007
- Publication place: United Kingdom
- Media type: Print (hardback, paperback)
- Pages: 366 (hardback)
- ISBN: 978-0-00-721971-1 (first edition, hardback)
- OCLC: 123796905
- Preceded by: The Lords of the North
- Followed by: The Burning Land

Sword Song is the fourth historical novel in The Saxon Stories by Bernard Cornwell, published in 2007. Uhtred leads battles against the Danes, as King Alfred strengthens the defences of his kingdom of Wessex.

This novel was used as the basis for the second half of the second series of the BBC's The Last Kingdom.

== Plot summary ==
Alfred, King of Wessex, has Uhtred of Bebbanburg build one of the fortified towns that make up Alfred's system of defence. After ambushing a band of raiders, Uhtred learns that two powerful Norse earls, Sigefrid and Erik Thurgilson, allied with Uhtred's treacherous former friend Haesten, have occupied nearby Lundene. When he informs Alfred, he is given the task of collecting a force strong enough to take the city back, then handing it over to his cousin Æthelred.

Haesten invites him to a meeting across the Temes in Mercia. Haesten takes Uhtred to a graveyard, where a corpse rises from the earth to tell Uhtred that the Fates have decreed he is to be King of Mercia. Torn between his oath to Alfred, whom he dislikes, and the temptation to become a king in his own right, he listens to Haesten and the Thurgilson brothers' proposition: if Uhtred convinces his foster brother Ragnar of Northumbria to bring his men to join them in attacking first East Anglia, then Mercia and finally Wessex, then Uhtred will receive Mercia, while Sigefrid will get Wessex and Haesten East Anglia.

Uhtred ponders this offer while Sigefrid invites him to watch the crucifixion of some Christian prisoners. Uhtred recognizes one as his old comrade-in-arms, the Welshman Father Pyrlig. Knowing Pyrlig to be an experienced fighter, Uhtred tricks Sigefrid into promising the prisoners freedom if Pyrlig beats him in single combat – which he promptly does. Uhtred, Pyrlig and the other prisoners leave Lundene. Pyrlig tells Uhtred that the corpse was a trick, a living man put into a grave with a reed to breathe through. Uhtred swears to Pyrlig to keep his oath to Alfred.

In Wintanceaster, King Alfred gives his older daughter, Æthelflaed, in marriage to the Mercian Earldorman Æthelred. Alfred wants Lundene recaptured as soon as possible. He puts Æthelred in command of the warriors allotted to the task, but tells him to heed Uhtred's advice. Instead, Æthelred changes Uhtred's battle plan the day before the attack, but Uhtred had no intention of using it anyway. Uhtred takes boats through extremely dangerous waters to land his men on an undefended wharf at dawn. Unaware of this, the defenders sally forth to attack Æthelred's men, and end up between Æthelred's and Uhtred's warriors. The Norse are defeated. Osferth (Alfred's eldest, but illegitimate son) leaps from the walls onto Sigefrid and cripples him. Uhtred allows Sigefrid and Erik to retreat, unwilling to lose more of his own men. They take refuge with Haesten at Haesten's stronghold at Beamfleot. Alfred appoints Uhtred military governor of Lundene.

Uhtred does not get along with Æthelred and his advisor Aldhelm, especially since Æthelred regularly beats his wife out of jealousy.

When a strong Danish fleet from Frisia led by Gunnkel Rodeson invades and attacks one of Alfred's burhs, Alfred gathers a strong force, but Æthelred does not bring his fleet and men to trap the enemy, and the Danes get away. Some of them join Sigefrid.

Finally, Alfred orders Æthelred to attack Gunnkel. After initial success, Æthelred is forced to retreat, with great losses. He also manages to lose his wife in the process. Alfred is distraught. Uhtred is sent to negotiate ransom terms with Sigefrid. Whilst in their camp, he learns that Erik and Æthelflaed have fallen in love, whereupon Erik and he plot to spirit her away.

A week later, Uhtred takes a ship with his household guard to help Erik and Æthelflaed escape; his role is to remove the ship blocking the passage to the sea. Upon arriving, however, he finds Sigefrid's hall ablaze. Haesten has betrayed Sigefrid and kidnapped Æthelflaed, wanting the enormous ransom for himself. Uhtred now has to fight to keep the blocking ship in place to prevent Haesten from escaping with Æthelflaed. After much confused fighting, Haesten flees emptyhanded, as Sigefrid has recaptured Æthelflaed. When Erik tries to get her back, he is killed by his brother, who has finally realised what is going on. Uhtred and his crew quickly defeat Sigefrid's outnumbered warriors, and Uhtred orders Osferth to kill Sigefrid. Uhtred then has no choice but to take Æthelflaed back to her father and Æthelred.

== Characters ==
- Uhtred Ragnarson – the protagonist, dispossessed Ealdorman of Bebbanburg, narrator
- Gisela – Uhtred's wife
- Stiorra – Uhtred's baby daughter
- Uhtred Uhtredson – Uhtred's son
- King Alfred of Wessex – The King of Wessex and Utred's feudal lord
- Aethelflaed – King Alfred's daughter and wife to Athelred
- Aethelred – Ealdorman of Mercia and Alfred's son-in-law
- Aethelwold of Wessex – Nephew of King Alfred
- Steapa Snotor – A fierce Saxon warrior, captain of Alfred's house troops, former rival, now friend, of Uhtred
- Father Pyrlig – A Welsh priest and warrior who is a close friend of Uhtred
- Sihtric Kjartansson – Kjartan's illegitimate son, sworn to Uhtred
- Father Beocca – Uhtred's friend and teacher
- Father Willibald- West Saxon priest and good friend of Uhtred
- Thyra Ragnarsdottir – Father Beocca's wife
- Osferth – Leofric's nephew and Alfred's illegitimate son
- Ralla – Uthred's new shipmaster
- Finan (the Agile) – Irish ex-slave and captain of Uhtred's household troops
- Rypere – A Saxon, one of Uhtred's household troops and oath-men
- Clapa – One of Uhtred's household troops and oath-men
- Cerdic – One of Uhtred's household troops and oath-men
- Sigefrid – A Norse warlord with the ambition of conquering Wessex
- Erik – Sigefrid's brother
- Earl Haesten – A treacherous Danish warlord who earlier broke his oath to Uhtred, despite Uhtred once saving his life (seemingly based on a Viking leader of the same name recorded in the Anglo-Saxon Chronicle)

== Reception ==
The Observer said: "The skill with which Cornwell blends historical fact and gripping narrative, outlining the political power struggles of the era, is exemplary." Kirkus Reviews called the book "vastly entertaining" and "[c]onsistently fascinating".

== Publication history ==
- 2007, UK, HarperCollins (ISBN 978-0-00-721971-1), pub date 3 September 2007, hardback (first edition)
- The US release was published in January 2008.
