= The Pagan Lord =

2013 historical novel by Bernard Cornwell

- First edition cover
- Author: Bernard Cornwell
- Cover artist: Jarrod Taylor
- Language: English
- Series: The Saxon Stories
- Genre: Historical novel
- Publisher: HarperCollins
- Publication date: 2013
- Publication place: United Kingdom
- Media type: Print (hardback)
- Pages: 303 (hardback edition)
- ISBN: 978-0-00-7331901 (hardback edition)
- Preceded by: Death of Kings
- Followed by: The Empty Throne

The Pagan Lord is the seventh historical novel in The Saxon Stories by Bernard Cornwell, first published in 2013. The story is set in the early 10th century in Anglo-Saxon Mercia and Northumbria.

Ten years of relative peace have passed since Alfred died. That is long enough for the Danes. Saxon warlord Uhtred of Bebbanburg tries again to gain his own inheritance and again fights for the kingdoms of Mercia and Wessex, now with his grown son as part of his warrior band.

== Plot summary ==
There have been ten years of relative peace on the island of Britain between the Saxons and the Danes.

Uhtred disowns his elder son Uhtred because he has just taken vows to become a Christian priest. He renames his elder son Father Judas, and then bestows the name Uhtred on his younger, 19-year-old son Osbert. Abbot Wihtred strikes Uhtred in anger, whereupon Uhtred grabs a staff and unintentionally kills him. As a result, nearly all of Uhtred's Christian warriors leave him. Aethelflaed, Queen of Mercia and Uhtred's lover, takes these men into her service.

Reaching home, Uhtred discovers that Cnut Longsword burned down his hall because he mistakenly believed Uhtred had taken his wife and children. He manages to convince Cnut that he is innocent. Returning home, Uhtred finds all his outbuildings burnt, this time by Bishop Wulfheard. He has nothing to rebuild and a shrunken force. He decides to try to reclaim his inheritance, the fortress at Bebbanburg in Northumbria, held by his uncle Aelfric. Aelfric stole the fortress from Uhtred after Uhtred's father was killed by the Danes forty years earlier. His uncle had tried and failed to kill Uhtred; then he had him sold into slavery. They kill some of his uncle's men and succeed in entering through the first gate, masquerading as the dead men, but are detected too soon, trapped and outnumbered. While Uhtred confronts his cousin, also named Uhtred, Finan, Uhtred's second in command, takes captive the uncle, cousin Uhtred's wife Ingulfrid and her 11-year-old son (also named Uhtred). Uhtred kills his uncle and uses the wife and son of his cousin as hostages to leave. They sail to Frisia to rest and refit.

Uhtred figures out that Cnut is readying for war, after ten years of relative peace. Cnut's wife and children had not been kidnapped; it was part of Cnut's ruse to persuade Aethelred, Aethelflaed’s despised husband, into believing that Cnut would be preoccupied with an enemy, encouraging Aethelred to attack East Anglia, a Danish-held area that is also Christian. Cnut then invades Mercia. Uhtred sails to the east coast of Britain. He proceeds to Bearddan Igge (Bardney Abbey), where the Mercians have been searching for some of the bones of St. Oswald. Mercian priests say that if all of Oswald's bones can be brought back together, it will be a sign that Wessex and Mercia can defeat the Danes. Uhtred plants an anonymous partial skeleton for them to find.

Uhtred takes his men to Ceaster (Chester) and defeats the men guarding Cnut's family. He captures Cnut's wife and two children. When the children see a priest, they mistakenly greet him as Uncle (Abbot) Wihtred, so Uhtred realizes the abbot he killed was Cnut's man.

Uhtred threatens to kill his captives to force a Danish force to raise its siege of Glaewecestre (Gloucester). Inside Glaewecestre, he finds Osferth, Aethelflaed, and the bishop who burned Uhtred's barns. Uhtred sets fire to all of Cnut's boats but one, which Osferth takes to reach King Edward.

Uhtred buys time by tricking Cnut into believing that he killed Cnut's daughter. Enraged, Cnut pursues Uhtred and his greatly outnumbered band. Uhtred hopes that the time Cnut wastes will enable Edward to bring his army.

At Teotanheale (Tettenhall), Uhtred awaits Cnut's attack. Before the battle, Uhtred gives Cnut his wife and daughter back, keeping the son. Although Uhtred uses his wiles to kill some of Cnut's men (despite being grossly outnumbered), he is on the verge of defeat when Father Judas, his disowned son, brings Father Pyrlig and a few hundred Welsh warriors to reinforce him. Then Cnut and Uhtred fight. Uhtred injures Cnut, but Cnut is carried away by his men. Uhtred's son slays Cnut's main ally, Sigurd Thorsen. Then King Edward arrives with his men and the Mercians. The Danes break and the Saxons have the victory. Word is that Aethelred was badly wounded, but still lives. Cnut comes back for a one-on-one fight with Uhtred. Uhtred kills Cnut, though he is grievously wounded himself, nearly to the point of death. But he lives.

== Characters ==
=== Fictional ===
- Uhtred Uhtredson – the narrator, dispossessed Ealdorman of Bebbanburg, now in his 50s.
- Finan (the Agile) – Irish ex-slave and captain of Uhtred's household troops.
- Uhtred Uhtredson – Uhtred's elder son, later called Judas.
- Osbert – Uhtred's youngest child, later called Uhtred, 19 years old.
- Osferth – King Alfred's illegitimate son, now a member of Uhtred's household troops.
- Steapa Snotor – A fearsome Saxon warrior, captain of the King's household guard under Alfred and kept in that role by King Edward.
- Father Pyrlig – Welsh priest and warrior and a close friend of Uhtred.
- Sihtric Kjartanson – Kjartan's illegitimate son, sworn to Uhtred.
- Aelfric of Bebbanburg – Uhtred's uncle, illegitimate possessor of Bebbanburg (Bamburgh Castle), Uhtred's hereditary home.
- Uhtred of Bebbanburg – Uhtred's cousin, heir to Aelfric.
- Sigunn – Uhtred's woman, not his wife, briefly taken by Cnut and then released.
- Ingulfrid – wife of Uhtred's cousin, and mother to Uhtred, renamed Osbert by his cousin.
- Abbot Wihtred – abbot from Northumbria who preaches about Saint Oswald to the Mercians, accidentally killed by Uhtred.
- Mirwalla – Mercian soldier who likes Uhtred, put in charge of Gloucester garrison.
- Cnut Ranulfson (or Longsword) – Jarl in Danish-held lands north of Mercia, known for his quickness in fighting.
- Frigg – beautiful wife of Cnut, mother of his son and daughter; she is deaf and dumb, and the granddaughter of a fortune teller whom Uhtred once sought.
- Sigurd Thorsen – Jarl in Danish-held lands north and west of Mercia, whose son was killed by Uhtred years earlier.
- Bruna – wife of Haesten, now grey-haired, who converted to Christianity at Alfred's request; he was the godfather to both her sons.
- Bishop Wulfheard – first led condemnation of Uhtred and burned his barns, then was in charge of the garrison at Gloucester while Aethelred brought his men to East Anglia.

=== Historical ===
- Aethelflaed – King Alfred's daughter and wife to Æthelred
- King Edward – King Alfred's son and King of Wessex
- Æthelstan – son of King Edward from his first wife, Ecgwynn
- Earl Haesten – A Danish Jarl (earl), who previously broke a life-oath to Uhtred who is now a dangerous enemy, seemingly based on a Viking leader of the same name recorded in the Anglo-Saxon Chronicle
- Æthelred, Lord of the Mercians -Aethelflead's husband and Uhtred's cousin

== Reviews ==
Kirkus Reviews says the narrative meanders: "The death of Alfred the Great leaves what we know as England up for grabs, and Lord Uhtred of Bebbanburg (Death of Kings, 2012, etc.) is caught in the middle of it all. ... The big set pieces are more impressive than the realistically meandering odyssey that threads them together. The most consistent motif is Uhtred’s undying and principled hostility to “the nailed god” of Christianity and the threat he represents to the warrior code Uhtred so perfectly embodies."

== Historical accuracy ==
The historical basis for the fictional tale rests on the Anglo-Saxon Chronicle, which recorded a great battle between the Angles and the Danes at Teotanheale (Tettenhall) In the year 910. The victory was to the Angles, with an army composed of men from Wessex and Mercia. Two Danish leaders were killed in the battle, Eowils and Healfdan, whose roles were taken by the fictional Danes already part of Uhtred's life. No details of the battle were recorded other than these, so the progress of it is fictional. The River Tame flowed near Tettenhall then. It is true that Mercians travelled to Northumbria in search of Saint Oswald's bones, found them and interred them in Gloucester, minus the skull (claimed by many, perhaps at Durham) and the arm kept at Bebbanburg (Bamburgh). This is not the last battle between the Angles or Saxons and the Danes, but it was a decisive victory. The system of burhs for defence started by King Alfred to keep Wessex safe expands in the territories his son gains in battle.

== Publication history ==
Hardback editions

- September 2013, HarperCollins, ISBN 0007331908 / 9780007331901, UK edition
- January 2014, Harper, ISBN 0061969702 / 9780061969706, USA edition

There are in addition four UK paperback editions and one US paperback edition. Two audio CD editions have been issued, one for the UK (HarperCollins Warlord Chronicles 7) and one for the US (Harper Audio Saxon Tales, read by Matt Bates). There are two Kindle editions, one for the UK and one for the US.
