= The Saxon Stories =

Series of novels by Bernard Cornwell

- The Last Kingdom; The Pale Horseman; The Lords of the North; Sword Song; The Burning Land; Death of Kings; The Pagan Lord; The Empty Throne; Warriors of the Storm; The Flame Bearer; War of the Wolf; Sword of Kings; War Lord
- Author: Bernard Cornwell
- Country: United Kingdom
- Language: English
- Genre: Historical novel
- Publisher: HarperCollins
- Published: 2004–2020
- Media type: Print (hardback & paperback) Audiobook

The Saxon Stories (also known as Saxon Tales/Saxon Chronicles in the US and The Warrior Chronicles and most recently as The Last Kingdom series) is a historical novel series written by Bernard Cornwell about the birth of England in the ninth and tenth centuries. The series consists of 13 novels. The protagonist of the series is Uhtred of Bebbanburg, born to a Saxon lord in Northumbria. He is captured as a child and raised by a Danish warlord. Uhtred, despite his inclination otherwise, repeatedly fights and schemes to bring about Alfred the Great's dream of uniting all English speakers in one realm over the course of a long life.

The first ten novels in the series were adapted for five seasons of the television series The Last Kingdom, starring Alexander Dreymon. The first two seasons were made by the BBC. A third, fourth and fifth season were produced by Netflix. Cornwell subsequently posted a note on his web site that "The Warrior Chronicles/Saxon Stories had been renamed The Last Kingdom series".

== Inspiration ==
In an interview with Emerson College, Cornwell said:

Years ago, when I was at university, I discovered Anglo-Saxon poetry and became hooked on that strange and often melancholy world. For some reason the history of the Anglo-Saxons isn't much taught in Britain (where I grew up) and it struck me as weird that the English really had no idea where their country came from. Americans know, they even have a starting date, but the English just seemed to assume that England had always been there, so the idea of writing a series about the creation of England was in my head for a long time.

The historical setting is the big story; writing historical fiction needs a little story so the history can be the background.

When he was 58, Cornwell met his birth father, William Outhred (or Oughtred), for the first time while on a book tour in Vancouver, Canada. There was a family tree going back to the 6th century. He learned the story of his own descent from the Saxons who possessed the fortress of Bebbanburg (now Bamburgh Castle), including the historical Uhtred the Bold. Thus was born Uhtred, the protagonist of the fictional tales.

== Overview ==
Locations of places in series

Uhtred is the second son of a Saxon lord who rules from the nearly impregnable fortress at Bebbanburg (modern-day Bamburgh) in the kingdom of Northumbria. Danish raiders kill first his older brother, then his father. Uhtred himself is spared only because the Danish leader, Ragnar the Fearless, is amused when the youngster attacks him. Ragnar takes Uhtred home and raises the boy like one of his own sons. Uhtred abandons Christianity in favour of Danish pagan beliefs, such as the gods Thor and Odin, and Valhalla. In particular, he believes that the Norns control his destiny and that therefore "Wyrd bið ful āræd" ("Fate is inexorable").

When he is an adult, that fate drives him to serve Alfred the Great, whom he dislikes but respects, and Alfred's dream of uniting all English speakers into a single kingdom, Englaland. To his great disgust, Uhtred finds himself saving Alfred's Christian kingdom of Wessex (and other Saxon kingdoms) time and time again from those who threaten it, including the pagan Danes who have settled in Britain, despite despising Christianity and admiring the Danes. When Wessex is overrun and Alfred is at his lowest point, hiding with a few followers in a marsh, Uhtred encounters him by chance, helps organize his slowly gathering army and plays a vital role in the crucial Battle of Ethandun, which saves Wessex from destruction.

Uhtred's overriding ambition, however, is to take Bebbanburg, stolen from him by his uncle after his father's death.

The story is told almost entirely from Uhtred's first-person perspective. The reader knows only what Uhtred knows or later learns. (The prologue of The Empty Throne is written from the perspective of Uhtred's second son, before reverting to Uhtred's viewpoint.)

Cornwell provides a "Historical Note" at the end of each novel in which he clarifies which characters and events are based on actual history and what liberties he took with them.

== Style ==
The series is frequently compared to The Warlord Chronicles, not only because of similarities between the two protagonists (both were orphaned), but also in the similarities between the foreign menace in the form of the Danes in The Saxon Stories and the Saxons in The Warlord Chronicles. Alfred also resembles Arthur in his mission as the only man to save his kingdom (England for Alfred, southern Celtic Britain for Arthur) from an unstoppable threat.

The main character, Uhtred of Bebbanburg, is an old man telling tales of events that took place decades earlier, starting from his childhood and going on, his story intertwining with the story of the British Isles in the end of the ninth century. He intersperses the narrative with often acerbic comments regarding the events and characters he describes. It is notable that the Saxon-born Uhtred, baptised Christian three times, has a very critical view of the Christian religion throughout the entire series. Though he takes an oath to serve Alfred, he admires the Danes, their way of life and their gods. This offers the reader a balanced picture of the tumultuous times, when it was uncertain whether there would be an England or a "Daneland" in the southern and central parts of the island of Britain.

== Series titles ==
This series of novels is known by several titles. Saxon Stories and Saxon Tales were the first titles in the US and the UK editions for the first five novels, and those titles continue in use for later novels. Starting with The Death of Kings, the UK editions bear the series title, The Warrior Chronicles. The series is also known as The Saxon Chronicles on US editions. In the autumn of 2015, a series of television programs based on the first two novels and using the title of the first novel – The Last Kingdom – has led booksellers to link the novels to the television series by referring to them as The Last Kingdom novels. The author renamed the series The Last Kingdom, according to a news notice at his website.

== Bibliography of the series ==
Bernard Cornwell mentioned in the historical notes at the end of The Lords of the North, the third novel, that he intended to continue writing The Saxon Stories. On his website, Cornwell stated "I need to finish Uhtred". In an interview, in answer to a question of how many more books are planned for the series, he replied:

I wish I knew! I don't know how the chapter I'm writing now will end, let alone the book, and the series? No idea! I suspect there will be a few more; I just heard that BBC Television have commissioned a series that will follow Uhtred's escapades. The company that makes Downton Abbey will make the programs, which is wonderful, and I’ll need to keep them supplied with stories (I hope). So? Six more? Eight more? I just don’t know.

On 5 March 2020, Cornwell announced on social media that the 13th book, War Lord, would be the final novel in the series.

Following is a list of the novels with their UK publication years.

1. The Last Kingdom (2004)
2. The Pale Horseman (2005)
3. The Lords of the North (2006)
4. Sword Song (2007)
5. The Burning Land (2009)
6. Death of Kings (2011)
7. The Pagan Lord (2013)
8. The Empty Throne (2014)
9. Warriors of the Storm (2015)
10. The Flame Bearer (2016)
11. War of the Wolf (2018)
12. Sword of Kings (2019)
13. War Lord (October 2020)

Cornwell also co-authored with Suzanne Pollak Uhtred's Feast: Inside the World of the Last Kingdom (2023), which consists of recipes from the period, three new short stories ("The First Victory," "The Gift of God," and "The Last Shield Wall," from the early, middle and late stages of Uhtred's life, respectively) and facts about how the people lived and what they ate.

On 25 June 2025, Cornwell shared on his blog that he planned to write another book in the Saxon Stories. Currently unnamed, the book will feature Uhtred and his followers, and it is said to take place in France and Italy. Cornwell further states that the book will be placed around the time of the eighth book in the series, The Empty Throne. This story is set in the year 911 AD, leading many fans to speculate the story will feature Rollo, the Count of Rouen, whose successors later established the Duchy of Normandy.

== Timeline of the series ==
The Saxon Stories timeline
Book	Period covered	Uhtread's age (at the beginning)	Final battle
The Last Kingdom	866–877	9	Battle of Cynwit
The Pale Horseman	877–878	20	Battle of Edington
The Lords of the North	878–881	21	Fictional battle of Dunholm
Sword Song	885–886	28	Fictional raid on Lundene
The Burning Land	892–893	35	Battle of Benfleet
Death of Kings	899–902	42	Battle of the Holme
The Pagan Lord	910	53	Battle of Tettenhall
The Empty Throne	911	54	Sihtric Cáech's fictional raid on Ceaster
Warriors of the Storm	914	57	Fictional battle between Sihtric Cáech and Ragnall ua Ímair
The Flame Bearer	917	60	Fictional battle for Bebbanburg
War of the Wolf	918–921	61	Fictional battle of Heahburh
Sword of Kings	924	67	Fictional battle of Cripplegate
War Lord	927–937	70	Battle of Brunanburh

== Television adaptation ==
In July 2014, the BBC announced that production would begin in autumn 2014 on a television adaptation of The Saxon Stories, to be titled The Last Kingdom. Stephen Butchard was the writer. A series of eight 60-minute episodes was produced. BBC Two, Carnival Films and BBC America are involved in the production. The series premiered on BBC America on 10 October 2015 and on BBC Two in the UK on 22 October 2015.

In an interview, Cornwell said he did not believe that the success of Game of Thrones led to the decision to produce The Last Kingdom. "I don’t think so, [Game of Thrones] is fantasy, unless the appeal is brutal men in chain mail and leather beating the shit out of each other ... I can't see anything else we have in common. This is rooted in reality. And even though Uhtred didn't exist as I have written it, there is always that big story ... in the background". The big story, in Cornwell's terms, refers to the history of Alfred and the start of England.

Two series had aired by early 2018. The third, fourth and fifth, each with ten episodes, were released exclusively by its sole producer Netflix; the BBC was no longer involved. The series concluded with the fifth season and would be followed by a two-hour feature film, Seven Kings Must Die, which finished filming in March 2022 in Hungary.
