= The Lords of the North =

2006 historical novel by Bernard Cornwell

- First edition cover
- Author: Bernard Cornwell
- Language: English
- Series: The Saxon Stories
- Genre: Historical novel
- Publisher: HarperCollins
- Publication date: 22 May 2006
- Publication place: United Kingdom
- Media type: Print (hardback)
- Pages: 366 (hardback edition)
- ISBN: 0-00-721968-7 (first, hardback edition)
- OCLC: 224807788
- Preceded by: The Pale Horseman
- Followed by: Sword Song

The Lords of the North is the third historical novel in The Saxon Stories by Bernard Cornwell published in 2006. The story is set in the 9th century Anglo-Saxon kingdoms Wessex and Northumbria. Uhtred wants revenge against his uncle, and falls in love. He fights for both the Danes and for Alfred.

== Plot summary ==
878 – 880/881: Angered by Alfred's meagre reward for saving his kingdom, the 21-year-old Uhtred of Bebbanburg sails back to his native Northumbria in 878, seeking revenge against his uncle Ælfric and childhood enemies Sven the One-Eyed and Kjartan the Cruel. He travels by ship with his lover and former nun, Hild. They make landfall near Eoferwic (York) to find the region in chaos. Ivarr Ivarsson, the most powerful Danish lord in Northumbria, has led his army north against the Scots. While he is away, the Saxon residents of Eoferwic, under the fanatical Father Hrothweard, have massacred many of the Danes there. The central lands of Dunholm are under the control of Kjartan, and Bebbanburg is held by Ælfric.

Uhtred is hired to escort a Danish merchant's family north, through Dunholm. Their path leads to a trap laid by Sven to capture and either sell travelers into slavery or extract ransoms from them. In order to avoid being recognised, Uhtred hides his face and calls himself Thorkild the Leper, Dark Swordsman of Niflheim. When Sven decides to sell Hild and the merchant's twin daughters, Uhtred takes Sven at swordpoint. He orders Sven's men to leave and convinces Sven he is a warrior returned from the dead to haunt him and his father. He frees the Dane Guthred of Cumbraland from the slave pens; the amiable Guthred claims to be the king of Northumbria.

In Cumbraland, Guthred converts to Christianity and is hailed as king of Northumbria by the Saxon Abbot Eadred, who claims to have foreseen Guthred's arrival in dreams sent by God, though he initially mistakes Uhtred for him. Uhtred becomes the commander of Guthred's household troops, as well as his closest advisor. He trains a band of thirty new warriors and foils an attempt by Kjartan's infiltrators to capture him and Guthred. Uhtred becomes smitten with Guthred's sister, Gisela.

He marches east with Guthred. With Ivarr Ivarsson away fighting the Scots, they capture Eoferwic easily. (They later learn that Ivarr was decisively defeated.) There Father Hrothweard joins them. As they march north to Dunholm, Guthred betrays Uhtred. He makes a deal with Uhtred's treacherous uncle, Ælfric, for his support against Kjartan. In return, Ælfric wants Uhtred dead, but Guthred gets him to accept something less. He pays Danish trader Sverri to take the unsuspecting Uhtred as a slave.

For two years, Uhtred is a rower on Sverri's trading ship. During that time, he befriends a fellow slave, Finan the Agile, an Irish warrior. Then a mysterious red Danish longship pursues their ship. During a trading venture to England in the year 880, 23-year-old Uhtred is confronted by Sven, who recognizes him but is scared away when the red ship appears, and warriors debark and attack. They mysterious band is led by Uhtred's foster brother and close friend, Ragnar Ragnarson. Uhtred returns to Wessex to learn that Hild convinced Alfred to send Ragnar, a hostage, (and Steapa) to his rescue, promising to use Uhtred's hidden hoard of treasure to build an abbey and recommit herself to Christ. Upon meeting with a Mercian traveling entertainer and spy, Offa, Uhtred learns that Guthred, Ivarr and Ælfric besieged Kjartan at Dunholm, but failed.

Alfred despatches Father Beocca as his ambassador to Guthred, supposedly to make peace in Northumbria, but also sends along Uhtred, Steappa and Ragnar, which convinces Uhtred that Alfred has other intentions. They arrive in Guthred's court to find that Gisela was married to Ælfric by proxy in return for support in another attack against Kjartan, and that Ivarr is raising a new army to fight Guthred. Uhtred is certain his uncle will send no men to support Guthred. He fends off Ælfric's men and kills Brother Jænberht when he insists that Gisela is married. Intimidated, Brother Ida agrees that Gisela is not married, as the marriage has not been consummated. Uhtred then forgives Guthred for betraying him into slavery and declares his intention to marry Gisela. Despite the calls of many churchmen to instead execute Uhtred for the killing of Jænberht, Guthred agrees to the marriage.

Uhtred takes command of Guthred's troops for the attack on Dunholm, despite being outnumbered. In the night, he and eleven of his best men climb the hill and sneak into the fort through a gate used to fetch well water. Although they are discovered, they are assisted by Ragnar's sister Thyra, who has been held by Sven and Kjartan since the events of The Last Kingdom. Thyra turns Kjartan's own hounds against their masters, allowing Uhtred and his men to open the gate for Ragnar and Guthred's army to enter the stronghold and beat Kjartan's men. Sven is defeated by Finan; Thyra orders the hounds to kill Sven and ensures he dies slowly. Kjartan himself is killed in single combat by Ragnar, who refuses to allow him to die with a sword in his hand, thus denying him entry into Valhalla. After the battle, Guthred gives Dunholm to Ragnar at Uhtred's insistence.

Guthred's army faces Ivarr's stronger force, but Uhtred cleverly provokes the hotheaded Ivarr into single combat. He defeats Ivarr, but before killing him, Uhtred gives him his sword to hold so as not to alienate Ivarr's men, whom he then recruits for Guthred.

== Characters ==
- Uhtred – the protagonist, narrator, dispossessed ealdorman of Bebbanburg
- King Alfred of Wessex – King of Wessex
- Guthred – Danish slave rescued by Uhtred who insists he is king of Northumbria
- Gisela – Sister of Guthred
- Hild – Saxon woman, a former nun who becomes Uhtred's companion, friend and lover
- Ragnar Ragnarsson – Danish warlord, son of Earl Ragnar, and Uhtred's foster brother and close friend
- Father Beocca – Alfred's priest and Uhtred's family friend
- Steapa Snotor – Saxon warrior and Uhtred's friend
- Kjartan the Cruel – Master of Dunholm, killer of Earl Ragnar the Fearless
- Sven the One-Eyed – One-eyed son of Kjartan, enemy of Uhtred
- Thyra Ragnarsdottir – Sister of Ragnar, kidnapped by Sven, eventually rescued
- Ivarr Ivarsson – Danish warlord, son of Ivar the Boneless
- Rypere – Saxon boy Uhtred trains
- Clapa – Danish boy Uhtred trains
- Sihtric Kjartansson – Kjartan's illegitimate son sworn to Uhtred
- Jænberht and Ida – Monks in the employ of Ælfric
- Abbot Eadred – Guthred's chief supporter and possessor of Saint Cuthbert's corpse
- Father Hrothweard – Priest in Eoferwic
- Tekil – Warrior employed by Kjartan
- Sverri Ravnsson – Danish trader from Jutland who buys Uhtred as a slave
- Hakka – Sverri's Frisian right-hand man
- Finan the Agile – Irish slave and warrior Uhtred befriends

== Publication details ==
- 2006, UK, HarperCollins ISBN 0-00-714992-1, Pub date 22 May 2006, hardback
