= The Last Kingdom =

2004 book by Bernard Cornwell

- First edition cover
- Author: Bernard Cornwell
- Language: English
- Series: The Saxon Stories
- Genre: Historical novel
- Published: 4 October 2004
- Publisher: HarperCollins
- Publication place: United Kingdom
- Media type: Print (hardback, paperback)
- Pages: 400 (hardback), 384 (paperback)
- ISBN: 0-00-714990-5 (first, hardback edition)
- OCLC: 56647847
- Followed by: The Pale Horseman

The Last Kingdom is the first historical novel in The Saxon Stories by Bernard Cornwell, published in 2004. This story introduces Uhtred of Bebbanburg, a Saxon noble who is kidnapped by Danish Vikings as a young child and is assimilated into their culture, religion and language before a series of events lead him into the service of King Alfred of Wessex and his participation in multiple battles, including the notable Battle of Cynwit before the book's conclusion.

== Plot summary ==
At nine years old Osbert is the second son of Ealdorman Uhtred, Lord of Bebbanburg in Northumbria during the year 866 AD. Danes arrive on Bebbanburg's shores, and Ealdorman Uhtred's first son, also called Uhtred, is killed while scouting. Ealdorman Uhtred then renames Osbert as Uhtred, son of Uhtred. Ealdorman Uhtred, other local nobles and their raised army are killed during a disastrous attack on Danish-seized Eoferwic (York) the following year, with the younger 10 years old Uhtred being captured by Danish Jarl Ragnar the Fearless. Ragnar, amused by the boy's bravery in attacking him, keeps him and raises him like one of his own sons, including training him to be a warrior. Uhtred's uncle, Ælfric, takes Bebbanburg and usurps the title of ealdorman and Bebbanburg from Uhtred, the rightful heir.

Uhtred befriends Ragnar's youngest son, Rorik, and has many clashes with one boy in particular, Sven, son of Kjartan, one of Ragnar's shipmasters. One day, Sven kidnaps Ragnar's daughter, Thyra, and removes part of her clothing in an effort to sexually assault her. Uhtred charges Sven, taking Sven's sword and attacking him with it. Uhtred, Rorik, and Thyra escape back to Ragnar's hall. Ragnar dismisses Kjartan from his service when Kjartan makes light of his son's behaviour. He also crushes one of Sven's eyes with the hilt of his sword – adding darkly that he would have crushed both, had Sven stripped Thyra completely naked.

Uhtred joins Ragnar and the Danes on raids across East Anglia, and participates in the conquests of Mercia and East Anglia, and the invasion of Wessex. He is kidnapped at the instigation of a priest, Beocca, an old family friend. He escapes from Wessex and rejoins Ragnar.

Uhtred enjoys life with Ragnar, but while he is out one night at the age of 15 during the year 872 AD, Kjartan and his men set fire to Ragnar's hall and kill everyone trying to escape, except for Thyra. Ragnar remains inside rather than die on Kjartan's terms. Thyra is captured and given to Sven.

Uhtred then joins King Alfred in Wessex during the year 874 AD. There he reluctantly learns to read and write at Alfred's insistence, because the king's military commanders must be able to read his written orders. He is given command of Alfred's new small fleet of 12 ships. After a battle with the Danes, he meets with Ragnar the Younger, Earl Ragnar's eldest son, and tells him how his father died and that Thyra was kidnapped. They part friends, swearing that one day they will take revenge on Kjartan and rescue Thyra.

Alfred orders Uhtred to marry a pretty orphaned Wessex girl named Mildrith in order to try to bind him to Wessex. Uhtred is not told that, by marrying her, he will also assume her father's enormous debt to the Church.

Afterwards, he takes part in a siege against Guthrum, and is among a group of hostages exchanged when the Danes and West Saxons make peace. Staying with the Danes in the city over the winter, he again meets Ragnar, who saves him from death when Guthrum breaks the peace and murders the other Saxon hostages. Uhtred then escapes to find his wife. She was taken by Odda the Younger, another Wessex ealdorman, to the north.

At the age of 20, during the 877 AD, he fights in the critical Battle of Cynwit, where he kills the renowned Danish leader Ubba in single combat. Uhtred then rides to Exanceaster to find his wife and newborn son, instead of going immediately to personally inform Alfred of his victory as strongly advised by his wiser friend.

== Characters ==
Cover for the mass-market paperback

=== Fictional ===
- Uhtred – dispossessed Ealdorman of Bebbanburg originally named Osbert(The Dane slayer)
- Earl Ragnar the Fearless – Danish warlord who raises Uhtred like his own son
- Ragnar Ragnarsson (Ragnar the Younger) – Ragnar's son, Uhtred's foster brother and close friend
- Rorik Ragnarsson – Ragnar's younger son and Uhtred's childhood friend
- Thyra Ragnarsdottir – Ragnar's daughter, kidnapped by Kjartan
- Brida – East Anglian Saxon girl, Uhtred's lover and friend
- Sigrid – Earl Ragnar's wife and mother to Ragnar the Younger, Rorik and Thyra
- Ravn – blind skald and Earl Ragnar's father
- Sven Kjartansson – Uhtred's sworn enemy and Kjartan's son
- Kjartan – Danish shipmaster who kills Earl Ragnar
- Father Beocca – Alfred's priest and Uhtred's family friend
- Mildrith – Uhtred's pious West Saxon wife
- Leofric – Uhtred's friend, warrior and shipmaster
- Odda the Younger – Ealdorman Odda's son and Uhtred's enemy
- Ælfric – Uhtred's uncle and usurper of Bebbanburg
- Lord Uhtred of Bebbanburg – Uhtred's father
- Gytha – Uhtred's stepmother
- Father Wilibald – West Saxon priest serving Alfred and close acquaintance of Uhtred

=== Historical ===
- Alfred the Great – King of Wessex
- Æthelflæd – Alfred's eldest daughter, Lady of the Mercians
- Erkenwald – bishop and Chaplin to Alfred
- Guthrum the Unlucky – Danish warlord
- Ubba Ragnarsson – Danish warlord feared by many, older brother to Ivar and Halfdan
- Ivar Ragnarsson (Ivar the Boneless) – Danish warlord feared by many, brother to Ubba and Halfdan
- Halfdan Ragnarsson – Danish warlord and younger brother of Ubba and Ivar
- Ælswith – Alfred's wife, who dislikes Uhtred
- Æthelwold – Alfred's nephew and acquaintance of Uhtred
- Ealdorman Odda – Ealdorman of Wessex
- King Edmund of East Anglia
- King Osbert of Northumbria
- Wulfhere – Ealdorman of Wiltshire
- Haesten – Danish warrior recruited and saved by Uhtred(Alfred's Spy)

== Television adaptation ==
In July 2014, the BBC announced that production would begin in autumn 2014 on a television adaptation, to be titled The Last Kingdom. Stephen Butchard is the writer. A series of eight 60-minute episodes was produced, and the series began airing on 10 October 2015. BBC Two, Carnival Films and BBC America were involved in the production. The series lasted for a total of five seasons, a total of 46 episodes, with the final season airing on 9 March 2022.

== Publication details ==
- 2004, UK, HarperCollins ISBN 0-00-714990-5, Pub date 4 October 2004, hardback
- 2005, UK, HarperCollins ISBN 0-00-714991-3, Pub date 30 May 2005, paperback
- 2006, UK, HarperCollins ISBN 0-00-721801-X, Pub date 3 October 2005, paperback (mass-market)
- 2006, USA, HarperTorch ISBN 0-06-053280-7, Pub date 30 June 2006, paperback (mass-market)

== See also ==
- Uhtred (Derbyshire ealdorman), real ealdorman during the book's set era
