= Fools and Mortals =

2017 historical novel by Bernard Cornwell

- First edition
- Author: Bernard Cornwell
- Language: English
- Genre: Historical novel
- Publisher: HarperCollins
- Publication date: 2017
- Publication place: United Kingdom

Fools and Mortals is a 2017 historical novel by Bernard Cornwell set in Elizabethan London. The protagonist is a younger brother of William Shakespeare.

== Plot summary ==
Fourteen-year-old Richard Shakespeare runs away when he is apprenticed to a brutal, ill-tempered carpenter. He heads to London, where his brother William is a successful actor and playwright. William grudgingly pays for his training as an actor. In 1595, Richard is a 21-year-old poorly paid actor in the Lord Chamberlain's Men, a playing company in which his brother is a Sharer (part-owner).

A larger, rival theatre is being built at the instigation of the Earl of Lechlade, so Richard goes there to check out his prospects of switching companies. However, deValle, the Earl's manager, is only interested in giving him a position if he will steal his brother's new plays, A Midsummer Night's Dream and Romeo and Juliet. Richard, despite William's poor treatment of him, turns him down.

Richard is tired of playing only women. (Women were not allowed to act in the English Renaissance theatre, so female roles were generally given to boys and young men.) William finally gives him a man's role, Francis Flute, but Richard becomes angry when he realises that Flute is a man who plays a woman in Pyramus and Thisbe, the play-within-the play of A Midsummer Night's Dream. As he learns more about the role, however, he sees that it is a good part after all.

A Midsummer Night's Dream is to be first performed at the wedding of a granddaughter of Lord Hunsdon, the Lord Chamberlain, patron of the Lord Chamberlain's Men and Queen Elizabeth's cousin. When the only complete copies of both plays are stolen, William flies into a rage and strikes his brother in the face, believing Richard to be the thief, as he knows that Richard saw deValle. However, Richard has an alibi of sorts. Then suspicion falls on 16-year-old actor Simon Willoughby, who has been forgetting his lines and resents being passed over for the role of Juliet. This suspicion is confirmed when Simon panics and runs away.

Richard offers to retrieve the copies if William will give him the role of Romeo. He guesses correctly that Simon has taken the copies to the nearby establishment where both of them were trained (and abused). He beats Simon and gets them back. As a reward, William gives Richard the part of Mercutio in Romeo and Juliet.

As the troupe practices at Blackfriars, one of Hunsdon's mansions, Richard falls in love with Sylvia, one of Lady Hendon's maids.

Despite various obstacles, including Puritan Pursuivants in the government who seek to shut down all theatres as dens of iniquity, the play is a rousing success. The wedding guests, including the Queen herself, are enthralled.

== Reception ==
Kirkus Reviews gave the book a favorable evaluation, calling Cornwell, "A master craftsman at work: imaginative, intelligent, and just plain fun."

In the Daily Express, Marco Giannangeli gave the novel four out of five stars, writing, "Fools And Mortals may not have the visceral cut-throat action of Sharpe or the Lost Kingdom but if a well-plotted, richly written romp through Shakespeare's England appeals, start reading."

The review in The Christian Science Monitor noted that "as in all the best historical fiction, readers will come away with a seminar's-worth of historical knowledge without feeling like they did any heavy lifting. ... [The Elizabethan theatrical world] is far better illuminated from the perspective of a semi-competent unknown striver like Richard than it might have been if seen from the viewpoint of his more successful brother or any of the other luminaries of the Lord Chamberlain's Men."

== Historical notes ==
William Shakespeare did have a younger brother named Richard (1578–1613), but little is known of him. Unlike the novel's character, the real Richard Shakespeare did not marry, nor is there any indication he turned to acting. Edmund (1580–1607), the youngest brother, did go to London and become an actor.
