= Sword of Kings =

2019 book by Bernard Cornwell

- First edition
- Author: Bernard Cornwell
- Language: English
- Series: The Saxon Stories
- Genre: Historical novel
- Published: October 2019
- Publication place: United Kingdom
- Media type: Print (hardback & paperback)
- Preceded by: War of the Wolf
- Followed by: War Lord

Sword of Kings is the twelfth historical novel in The Saxon Stories series by Bernard Cornwell. It was first published in October 2019.

Sword of Kings is set in 10th-century England and continues to follow the fortunes of the fictional Uhtred of Bebbanburg. This novel begins with his investigating the murder of fishermen under his protection. He then gets drawn into an expected succession struggle in Wessex and Mercia.

== Plot ==
A fishing ship from Bebbanburg goes missing. Then the body of one of its crew washes ashore; it is clear the fisherman had been tortured before being killed. Uhtred, Lord of Bebbanburg, goes to sea to investigate, then sets a trap for those responsible. He and his warriors kill or capture the crews of three ships, but the fourth vessel gets away. He learns that Ealdorman Æthelhelm ordered Waormund, a huge, sadistic warrior and one of his most trusted men, to try to kill Uhtred. Waormund tortured the fisherman and was aboard the ship that got away.

Edward, King of Wessex (and son of Alfred the Great), is dying. There are three strong candidates to succeed him: Edward's vicious adult son Ælfweard by his second wife; Æthelstan, Edward's eldest son by his first wife (though many incorrectly believe he is illegitimate); and Edmund, Edward's infant son by Queen Eadgifu of Mercia. Uhtred has raised Æthelstan and trained him to be king, so Æthelhelm had tried to preemptively remove Æthelstan's most effective supporter.

Eadgifu sends a message to Uhtred, begging for his help. Over the objections of his wife and friends, he heads south, as he also gave his oath to kill Æthelhelm upon the death of Edward (though he knows only that Edward is in very poor health), accompanied by his right-hand man Finan and a handful of his men. They rescue Eadgifu from capture by Æthelhelm's men and flee. Then Uhtred receives the news that Edward is dead. Edward's will gives the kingdoms of Wessex and East Anglia to Ælfweard and Mercia to Æthelstan; Uhtred realises that this will inevitably result in civil war.

Uhtred heads to Lundene (London), which is held by Æthelstan's men. He spots Waormund there, but Waormund gets away. Uhtred becomes concerned when he discovers that Merewalh, the commander of the garrison, has taken most of his men and marched east, having been deceived into believing that an enemy army is approaching. Before Uhtred can do anything, Waormund and his men open one of the city's gates, letting in Æthelhelm's army. The city falls.

Uhtred's party hides, then steals a ship and flees. By bad luck, Waormund sees him and sets out in pursuit with a large force. Eventually, Uhtred is trapped. He gives himself up so his men (as well as women and children he took responsibility for) have a chance to get away. Waormund humiliates him, but does not kill him immediately, as he wants to do so before a much larger audience, in Lundene. Fortunately, some of Merewalh's cavalrymen show up and free Uhtred.

Uhtred persuades Merewalh to give him 180 of his warriors and to agree to his plan to attack Lundene, despite being seriously outnumbered. They have no real choice, as Æthelhelm keeps growing stronger as reinforcements continue arriving. Messengers are sent to fetch Æthelstan's army, which is supposed to be nearby. Uhtred and his men ride boldly into the city, masquerading as some of Æthelhelm's allies. They seize a city gate – Crepelgate – and hold it long enough for Æthelstan to charge through. During the ensuing battle, Uhtred kills Waormund in single combat. A sizeable part of Æthelhelm's forces are from East Anglia and have no real stomach for battle; as Uhtred had hoped, they stay out of the fighting. Æthelstan wins. Æthelhelm is killed trying to flee, while Ælfweard is captured and personally executed by his half-brother Æthelstan.

Uhtred is told that an outbreak of the plague in the north has claimed his wife, son-in-law and grandchildren.

== Reception ==
Kirkus Reviews said the Sword of Kings "is historical adventure on a grand scale" and compared it to "the works of Conn Iggulden and Minette Walters", highlighting how "Cornwell paints vivid images of the filth in the Temes and in cities like Lundene". They noted that "few women are active characters", though "the action is believable if often gruesome and loathsome, and it never lets up for long".

Booklist also reviewed the novel.
