= Death of Kings =

2011 historical novel by Bernard Cornwell

- First edition cover
- Author: Bernard Cornwell
- Original title: Death of Kings
- Language: English
- Series: The Saxon Stories
- Genre: Historical novel
- Published: 2011
- Publisher: HarperCollins
- Publication place: United Kingdom
- Media type: Print (hardback & paperback)
- Pages: 335 (hardback)
- ISBN: 978-0-00-733179-6 (first edition, hardback)
- Preceded by: The Burning Land
- Followed by: The Pagan Lord

Death of Kings, published in 2011, is the sixth novel of Bernard Cornwell's Saxon Tales series. It continues the story of Saxon warlord Uhtred of Bebbanburg who resists a new Danish invasion of Wessex and Mercia.

== Plot ==
It is 899 AD. Alfred the Great is dying. Rivals for his throne are poised to tear his kingdom apart. Uhtred, a Saxon who has been raised by a Danish warlord, wants more than anything else to go and reclaim his stolen Northumbrian inheritance. But he knows that if he deserts the king's cause, Alfred's dream — a single kingdom encompassing all English speakers ("Englaland") — might vanish.

Uhtred is attacked by bandits sent to assassinate him, but defeats them. Alfred then sends him to negotiate a treaty with the king of East Anglia. Uhtred is suspicious and takes precautions which save him from an ambush. He manages to face a much larger Danish force led by Sigurd, a powerful Danish jarl, at a narrow bridge over the River Use. Sigurd attacks across the bridge, which negates his numerical superiority. Uhtred's men inflict numerous casualties, before burning the bridge. Uhtred aborts his mission and goes home.

He travels to Ceaster, where Haesten is besieged by a Mercian force. Uhtred leaves some of his men under the command of his loyal follower Finan. He has heard of a prophetess named Aelfadell and is curious. Uhtred unwarily drinks a drugged potion she gives him. He awakes tied up, with vague memories of the previous night. Three monks debate killing him, but Uhtred frees himself and slaughters them instead. He realizes that Aelfadell is being paid by Sigurd to make prophesies in the Dane's favour. Uhtred then procures a ship and, masquerading as a Frisian who is going home, sneaks in and burns Sigurd's ships, keeping one to sail to Lundene.

Uhtred is summoned to Wintanceaster by a dying Alfred. Alfred gives Uhtred a rich estate in Mercia at Fagranforda, finally rewarding him for his many invaluable services, but presses Uhtred into swearing an oath of loyalty to his son and heir, Edward, before dying. Aethelflaed is kidnapped by Aethelwold, but Uhtred saves her. After Edward is crowned king, Uhtred expects an attack from the Danes, but Sigurd is sick, and his fellow jarl and friend, Cnut, is unwilling to invade without him; Cnut also has troublesome Scots to deal with.

Uhtred has three women impersonate a trio of Christian angels to provide prophecies of their own to counter the words of Aelfadell. Danish raiders kidnap two of the "angels" and learn the truth. The Danes finally invade, three years after Alfred's death, from Ceaster. Uhtred retreats to a rotten fort at Cracgelad only to be surrounded by a Danish force led by Haesten. Haesten does not attack, instead retreating in the night because his force was meant only to distract the Mercian army from the true threat. Uhtred, now reinforced by warriors led by Steapa and Aethelflaed, pursues the larger Danish force to find out where the main invasion is taking place.

Uhtred finds the main Danish army and makes a hit-and-run attack that stops the enemy. Uhtred begs King Edward to come and attack, but Edward instead commands Uhtred to bring his men to Lundene, where his army is gathering. Uhtred arrives at Lundene expecting to move quickly, but Edward has been convinced by his advisors to wait, in part to await Sigelf and his 700 Kentish warriors. Strangely, the Danes do not move either. Uhtred suspects it is because they have no single leader and are divided as to what to do.

The Danes finally head for East Anglia to lure Edward into following. Their plan is to capture Lundene, once he is out of position. Sigelf is secretly in league with them. A hundred of Sigelf's men have been left behind at Lundene, supposedly because they have no horses, but in reality to seize and hold open a city gate. Sigelf and the rest of his warriors are to turn on Edward when the battle starts. Uhtred figures it out and attacks the turncoat Saxons at night, pretending to be Danish, killing Sigelf when he tries to stop the fighting with what he mistakenly believes are his Danish allies. Afterward, Uhtred convinces the turncoat Kentish men to fight for him. The real Danes attack, and a major battle between shield walls ensues. The Danes greatly outnumber and eventually surround Uhtred's force. Steapa arrives with reinforcements before Uhtred's men are overrun, and pushes the Danes back. There is no clear victor, but several of the invading leaders are dead and Sigurd is wounded. The Danes are forced to leave, as winter is coming and there is not enough food for their large army.

== Title of the novel ==
The books gained its title because Alfred the Great dies, but also because King Eohric king of East Anglia, and Aethelwold pretender to the West Saxon throne die in the last battle.

== Critical reception ==
A reviewer for National Public Radio said, "His characters are vividly drawn, betrayals lurk around every corner, the humor is as sharp as the swords, and the action is non-stop." In The New York Times, a reviewer wrote that Cornwell "writes morally complicated and intricate stories, and he's won a following not just among readers but also among fellow writers." A reviewer for The Observer wrote, "There are moments of terror, including one particularly striking episode when Uhtred goes to visit a witch and is drugged, bound and gagged while the naked, shrivelled crone cackles madness. Cornwell's plot is enlivened by passages of clear beauty as he describes the natural world in which such horrors take place".
