= Sharpe's Command =

2023 historical novel by Bernard Cornwell

- First edition
- Author: Bernard Cornwell
- Language: English
- Series: Richard Sharpe stories
- Genre: Historical novels
- Publisher: HarperCollins
- Publication date: 10 October 2023
- Publication place: United Kingdom
- Media type: Print
- Preceded by: Sharpe's Company (chronological); Sharpe's Assassin (publication)
- Followed by: Sharpe's Sword (chronological); Sharpe's Storm (publication)

Sharpe's Command is a historical novel in the Richard Sharpe series by Bernard Cornwell, first published in 2023. The story leads up to the Battle of Almaraz, which took place on 18–19 May 1812 in the Peninsular War.

== Plot summary ==
General "Daddy" Hill sends Major Sharpe on a reconnaissance mission to evaluate the defences protecting a vital French pontoon bridge across the River Tagus at Almaraz, Spain. The bridge is the only means by which the two French armies in Spain, one north of the river and the other south, can speedily come to each other's aid if attacked. Sharpe is accompanied by his 15 surviving riflemen, among them Sergeant Patrick Harper. Lieutenant Love (nicknamed "Cupid") is included, because as an artillery officer, he can best determine if and where cannons can be brought forward to attack the fortifications. Sharpe is also told of a local guerrilla leader who calls himself "El Héroe" (The Hero), who is willing to help in exchange for gold and rifles.

When Sharpe first encounters El Héroe's band, Sharpe and his men are mistaken for French soldiers (not wearing the normal scarlet uniforms) and shot at. Upon further acquaintance, he begins to suspect the Spaniard of secretly collaborating with the French, a suspicion that is later confirmed when he flees to the French.

General Hill arrives with 6000 men. His original plan to take the fort guarding the road to the bridge was divulged to El Héroe before he was unmasked, and has to be abandoned. Unable to use the road to bring up his artillery quickly, he has no other choice but to launch a risky escalade attack on Fort Napoleon, which guards the south end of the bridge. When Sharpe sees the assault faltering, due to the scaling ladders being too short, he notices a spot where a ladder will nearly reach the top of the fortress wall. He has a ladder moved to the spot and is the first man to climb it. Others follow, and the fort is taken. Sharpe's wife Teresa and another guerrilla leader, "El Sacerdote" (The Priest), help out with their men. The French, many of them poorly trained new recruits, are defeated, and many flee across the bridge to Fort Ragusa. Lieutenant Love makes himself useful by effectively bombarding Fort Ragusa using captured guns; the demoralised French soldiers abandon that position, enabling the British to destroy the pontoon bridge without further bloodshed.

Afterward, El Héroe is found hiding in a bread oven. Teresa, who hates the French, goads him into a duel. He is no match for her; she toys with him, prolonging his agony and humiliation by inflicting non-fatal wounds, before finally stabbing him in the groin and leaving him on the ground to bleed to death.

== Reception ==
Kirkus Reviews summarized: "Gripping action that’s not for the fainthearted." Library Journal said: "Cornwell again makes writing flawless historical prose seem effortless."

Curtis Edmonds reviewed the novel for the Bookreporter and he states "what makes the Sharpe novels work are the scenes of combat, and Cornwell draws upon all of his considerable talents here."
