= War of the Wolf =

2018 historical novel in The Saxon Stories series by Bernard Cornwell

- First edition
- Author: Bernard Cornwell
- Language: English
- Series: The Saxon Stories
- Genre: Historical novel
- Published: 2018
- Publication place: United Kingdom
- Media type: Print
- Preceded by: The Flame Bearer
- Followed by: Sword of Kings

War of the Wolf is the eleventh historical novel in The Saxon Stories series by Bernard Cornwell. It was first published in October 2018.

Set in the early 10th-century, this novel continues to follow the story of the fictional Uhtred of Bebbanburg and his hand in the creation of England as a unified country. Lured from his ancestral home by an unseen enemy, Uhtred must now fight to preserve the last kingdom of Northumbria from its foes.

== Plot ==
Æthelflaed, Uhtred's former lover and Lady of Mercia, dies in 918. Edward, King of Wessex, occupies Gleawecestre, an action signalling that Mercia is no longer an independent country. In 919, Uhtred is summoned by Edward to swear fealty, but he ignores the summons, and his lands in Mercia are forfeit. Uhtred exclaims he is content with Bebbanburg.

Yet he still feels bound by an oath he took to protect Æthelstan, his friend, protege and Edward's oldest son. So when there is a Mercian revolt against Edward, he rides with Finan and about 90 veteran warriors to relieve the siege of Ceaster. When he gets there, he realises he has been lied to; the besieged, led by Æthelstan, were in no real danger, and the enemy are soon defeated.

It becomes clear that the revolt was fomented by Æthelhelm the Younger in an attempt to kill Æthelstan. Æthelstan and his younger half-brother Ælfweard are the main candidates to succeed the ailing Edward. Æthelstan is the first born, but there are false rumours that his mother and Edward were not married. Æthelhelm is related by blood to Ælfweard, and has accused Uhtred of poisoning his father; Æthelhelm the Elder had been held for ransom, but sickened and died.

Ingilmundr, a Norse leader driven out of Ireland, seeks to conquer Æthelstan's realm. He informs Uhtred that his treacherous uncle, Sköll Grimmarson, is the one who lured Uhtred away from his home, to weaken Sigtryggr, King of Northumbria and Uhtred's son-in-law. Uhtred eventually discovers that Sköll is planning a surprise winter attack on Eoferwic, Sigtryggr's capital. As Uhtred races there, he spots Sköll and his men coming the other way with plundered cattle, women and children. Outnumbered, Uhtred ambushes the warriors at the rear, seriously wounds a skilled young warrior he later learns is Sköll's son, and takes two prisoners for questioning. He learns that Sköll was defeated, but Sköll and his son killed Stiorra, Uhtred's beloved daughter and Sigtryggr's wife. She was leading the defenders, as Sigtryggr was away. Sköll pursues Uhtred and his men, but Uhtred is reinforced by warriors led by Osferth, Alfred the Great's bastard oldest son. Osferth refuses to get dragged into a Northumbrian conflict, so there is no fighting.

Uhtred learns that Edward has called a witan at Tamweorthin, summoning Sigtryggr, but not him. He goes anyway. Eadgifu, Edward's wife, tries subtly enlisting his support against their mutual enemy, Æthelhelm, who is there. Æthelhelm tries to have him killed, but fails. Sigtryggr agrees to a treaty with Edward so that he can turn his full attention to avenging his wife. Then Æthelstan swears an oath to never fight against Uhtred or invade Northumbria (if he becomes king of Wessex) while Uhtred lives; in exchange, he gets Uhtred to swear to try to kill Æthelhelm.

Uhtred and Sigtryggr try to find Sköll, but have little luck. Sköll's warriors do not desert him, despite his failures, because they fear his sorcerer, Snorri. Sköll even gains new followers. Finally, Uhtred learns Sköll's stronghold is at Heahburh.

He and Sigtryggr lead nearly 500 warriors there, but their assault fails, and both Uhtred and Sigtryggr are wounded. Their situation is dire, as they are outnumbered, and retreating would be perilous. Then Snorri comes outside the fortress and starts cursing them. The half-mad, self-styled bishop Ieremias engages in a war of cursing and scores a victory of sorts, when Snorri's dog deserts him for the bishop. This enrages some of Sköll's wolf-warriors, half-crazed from applying an ointment of henbane. They charge out as a disorganised rabble, but are defeated by a disciplined shield wall. Berg becomes separated from the rest of Uhtred's men during the fighting. He finds his two older brothers in Sköll's fortress and persuades them to switch sides. With their help, Uhtred and Sigtryggr's warriors force their way inside, and Sköll's men either die or surrender. Sköll himself pretends to surrender, then tries to kill Sigtryggr, but Uhtred saves his son-in-law. Uhtred disables Sköll in single combat, then invites Sigtyrggr to avenge his wife, but not before he disarms Sköll, thus ensuring that Sköll will not go to Valhalla.
