= The Empty Throne =

2014 historical novel by Bernard Cornwell

- First edition cover
- Author: Bernard Cornwell
- Language: English
- Series: The Saxon Stories
- Genre: Historical novel
- Published: 23 October 2014 HarperCollins
- Publication place: United Kingdom
- Media type: Print
- Pages: 400 (hardback edition)
- ISBN: 978-0-00-750416-9 (hardback edition)
- Preceded by: The Pagan Lord
- Followed by: Warriors of the Storm

The Empty Throne is the eighth historical novel in The Saxon Stories series by Bernard Cornwell, first published in October 2014. It is set in 10th-century Mercia and Dyfed.

== Plot summary ==
In 911 AD, Uhtred of Bebbanburg's son, also named Uhtred, ambushes a small band of Norse raiders in the north of Mercia and brings the captives and plunder to Aethelflaed, who instructs him to take them to Gloucester, where the Mercian Witan is about to convene.

Aethelred, the King of the Mercians and estranged husband of Aethelflaed, is dying after being wounded in a battle at Teotanheale. The Witan is to decide Aethelred's successor, a difficult task as there is no obvious candidate. Eardwulf, whose sister is Aethelred's lover, commands Aethelred's household warriors and is a contender. Another is Edward, King of Wessex, but the Mercians do not wish to be ruled by a foreign king. Uhtred of Bebbanburg, who is seriously, perhaps fatally wounded, knows that Aethelflaed is the best choice, but the Witan will not choose a woman. Instead, Aetheflaed is likely to be consigned to a nunnery after Aethelred's death. Uhtred is puzzled at being summoned to the Witan. However, upon the discovery that Aethelhelm, the most powerful ealdorman in Wessex, is at the meeting, he realises this is a ploy to draw him away from Aethelstan, the son of King Edward's first wife. Aethelhelm wishes the boy to be killed to remove the only serious rival to his own grandson as heir to the throne of Wessex (his daughter being Edward's second wife).

The Witan reluctantly seems to settle on Eardwulf. As Eardwulf is not highly born, he will marry Aethelred's daughter. Uhtred pretends to be dying in order to leave without raising suspicion. He races back to his home and Aethelstan. After a fight with some of Aethelhelm's troops, Uhtred sends most of his followers, including Aethelstan, to Chester, while he and his daughter Stiorra go back to Gloucester to prevent Aethelred's daughter from being married to Eardwulf. He then rejoins the rest of his followers. Pursued by a much larger force, they take refuge in an abandoned fort. There Eardwulf demands he surrender Aethelstan. Uhtred refuses, but just before Eardwulf can attack, Aethelflaed arrives, seemingly with hundreds of warriors (though this is a deception), and commands him to return to Gloucester. Eardwulf leaves, but Uhtred knows that Eardwulf's scouts will soon discover that he has been deceived, and prepares a trap. Eardwulf's only chance for the throne is to kill Uhtred and Aethelflaed that night. Uhtred outwits his opponent, and Eardwulf, now an outlaw, flees with only a handful of retainers. Eardwulf's sister, Edith, is captured.

Uhtred returns to Gloucester, and he learns than Eardwulf has stolen Aethelred's wealth. With Eardwulf gone, Uhtred reminds the Witan that his mother was a Mercian and that he is Aethelred's closest male relative. To placate the priests, he also "converts" to Christianity. He is chosen, probably in part because they do not expect him to live long. He then promptly abdicates and names his successor: Aethelflaed.

Uhtred believes that he can only be cured if he possesses Ice-Spite, the sword Cnut used to inflict his wound. Edith becomes Uhtred's lover and reveals to him that she knows the location of Ice-Spite. Asser, a monk who hates Uhtred, took the sword to Wales, where he died. Uhtred heads to Wales and encounters Welsh King Hywel. They join forces and rout a Norse raiding party which burned down a monastery, tortured and killed the monks, and took Ice-Spite. Edith uses the sword to drain the pus from Uhtred's body. His pain immediately stops.

Uhtred realises that the exiled Eardwulf has joined a Norse fleet from Ireland, led by Sigtryggr. (The Irish are too strong, so the Norse are being driven out.) Eardwulf has joined them. Uhtred correctly guesses they are going to attack Ceaster. Uhtred rushes there and, realising that some of Eardwulf's men have infiltrated the fort, he has them seized. He learns they plan to open one of the gates for Sigtryggr upon seeing a pre-arranged signal. He prepares his own trap. When the Norse army attacks, their mounted warriors ride through the open gate, but find themselves trapped inside (Uhtred had ordered the construction of fortifications around the gate) and are slaughtered. Sigtryggr and a handful of his men manage to flee the killing ground. He then attacks Uhtred, but is distracted by Stiorra, and loses an eye to Uhtred before escaping.

The two sides negotiate a settlement. The Norse will abandon another, half-finished fort they had already captured, surrender half their weapons, and sail away the next day, as neither army has enough men to guarantee victory. As part of the bargain, Sigtryggr offers himself as hostage for the night. Also, Eardwulf and his few remaining followers are handed over to Uhtred; as part of Aethelstan's training to be a king, Uhtred has the boy Aethelstan execute him. When Sigtryggr and his fleet prepare to leave, however, Stiorra reveals that she and Sigtryggr have fallen in love at first sight, and she is going with him. Uhtred, seeing the similarities with himself and Gisela, gives her his approval (foiling Aethelflaed's marriage plan for her).

== Characters ==
=== Fictional ===
- Uhtred – dispossessed Ealdorman of Bebbanburg
- Uhtred – Uhtred's second son
- Finan the Agile – Irish former slave and Uhtred's second-in-command
- Osferth – King Alfred's illegitimate son and one of Uhtred's most trusted followers
- Stiorra – Uhtred's daughter
- Eardwulf – Commander of the household warriors of Æthelred, Lord of the Mercians
- Eadith – Eardwulf's sister and Æthelred's former lover

=== Historical ===
- Æthelflæd – King Alfred's eldest daughter, Lady of the Mercians
- King Edward – King Alfred's son and King of Wessex
- Æthelstan – Son of King Edward with his first wife, Ecgwynn
- King Hywel – Welsh King fighting Norse invaders.
- Sigtryggr – Danish jarl scouting Mercia for his father
- Æthelhelm – King Edward's father-in-law and the most powerful ealdorman in Wessex

== Reviews ==
The Times commented that "The Empty Throne is Cornwell's best Uthred tale yet. If there is a throne for writers of this particular type of muscular historical fiction, then Cornwell is firmly wedged in it. And on this evidence, he is not budging."

Kirkus Reviews says, "the lusty, rollicking narrative is totally accessible and great good fun.".

One reviewer wrote of this instalment, "copious bloodletting, ever-so-slightly anachronistic profanities, and intriguing political maneuvering", obviously liking what Cornwell has written as the latest in the Saxon Tales. "Cornwell's action-sequences are pearls of pure adrenaline", amid well-constructed characters with the historical detail skillfully woven into the plot.

Keith McCoy, writing for Library Journal, summarises highlights of the plot, including continuity from the previous novel, when both Uhtred and Aethelred were wounded, but Aethelred is dying, while Uhtred seeks a missing sword to heal himself and protect two children, and then remarks that "Once again, Cornwell perfectly mixes the history and personalities of tenth-century England with several doses of battles, trickery, and treachery."

The novel was on The New York Times Best Seller list of Hardcover Fiction in February 2015, entering at number 19.
