= The Flame Bearer =

2016 historical novel in The Saxon Stories series by Bernard Cornwell

- First edition cover
- Author: Bernard Cornwell
- Language: English
- Series: The Saxon Stories
- Genre: Historical novel
- Publisher: HarperCollins
- Publication date: 2016
- Publication place: United Kingdom
- Media type: Print (hardback)
- Pages: 284 (hardback edition)
- ISBN: 978-0062250780 (first, hardback edition)
- Preceded by: Warriors of the Storm
- Followed by: War of the Wolf

The Flame Bearer is the tenth historical novel in The Saxon Stories series, also known as The Last Kingdom series, by Bernard Cornwell, first published in October 2016. It is set in 10th-century England and continues to follow the fortunes of the fictional Uhtred of Bebbanburg. In this novel Uhtred sets out to finally regain his childhood home, Bebbanburg, which is now held by his cousin.

== Plot ==
Uhtred fails again to capture Bebbanburg. His son-in-law, the pagan warlord Sigtryggr, king of Northumbria, asks for help against invading West Saxons who seem intent on breaking the recent truce with Aethelflaed, the ruler of Mercia and King Edward of Wessex’s sister. Uhtred’s men are outnumbered by invading Scots led by Constantin intent on making Bebbanburg their own. However, Uhtred's cousin is willing to wait out the siege behind the nearly impregnable walls of his fortress.

Uhtred figures out that Aethelhelm – a wealthy and powerful Saxon warlord and King Edward’s father in-law – is planning to attack Edward’s men and make it look like Sigtryggr did it and so start the war that has been at least delayed a few years by the truce. It seems inevitable that Edward will want to drive all Danes from the north of the country and bring about the Christian Saxon kingdom his father Alfred dreamed of.

Aethelhelm wants to ensure that his grandson Aelfweard – Edward's second son – eventually becomes ruler of a united England. So he planned for Aethelstan (Edward's first son by his first wife) to be killed leading Edward's men in an ambush. However, Edward sends his trusted warrior Brunulf to lead his men instead. Uhtred sees through Aethelhelm's machinations and rescues Brunulf and his men from the fake Danish attack. He interrupts a meeting between Edward, Aethelflaed and Sigtryggr, where Aethelhelm’s clergy are war-mongering and reveals the truth of Aethelhelm's plot.

Edward has the prisoners Uhtred brought to show him executed. Queen Aethelflaed reveals that she is dying and can no longer protect Aethelstan. So Uhtred claims Aethelstan as his hostage in order to protect him and reconfirms the details of the treaty. Sigtryggr, his commitment to the truce proven, returns to Jorvik.

Uhtred then turns his attention back to Bebbanburg, which is besieged by the Scots. He pretends he has given up and moves all his men, women, children, goods, horses and cattle out of Dunholm and spreads rumours that he is sailing across the sea to Frisia. Instead he intends to use a ruse to get into Bebbanburg. While he is making preparations in Grimesbi, he realises that the ships coming in to the port and stocking up with goods are a supply fleet commanded by Aethelhelm. He despairs of ever winning back Bebbanburg because Aethelhelm's ships and men will get to the fortress before he does and provide both food and hundreds of Saxon reinforcements. His prayer for a miracle is answered: Northmen allied with the Scots burn most of Aethelhelm's ships and in the chaos, Uhtred escapes Grimesbi undetected.

He disguises his ships as Aethelhelm's supply ships and, chased by Aethelhelm's remaining warships, fools the guards in Bebbanburg into opening one of the fortress gates. Unbeknown to Uhtred, his son has helped Aethelstan stow away, and the prince quickly kills Aethelhelm's champion. After much fighting, Uhtred finally defeats both Aethelhelm and his cousin, killing the latter when he refuses to fight him one-on-one, and takes back his beloved Bebbanburg.

Aethelstan persuades Uhtred not to kill Aethelhelm, but to ransom him so he can replenish his coffers and weaken Aethelhelm. Aethelstan also suggests Uhtred keep Aethelhelm's daughter – who was supposed to be wed to Uhtred’s cousin as part of the resupply deal – as a hostage and this is much to Uhtred's son's liking, as he has taken a shine to her. Uhtred then tells the Scots to leave his land, which they do.

== Characters ==
Fictional

- Uhtred – narrator, dispossessed Ealdorman of Bebbanburg
- Uhtred – Uhtred's son
- Uhtred – Uhtred's cousin occupying Bebbanburg
- Finan the Agile – Former Irish slave, and Uhtred's second-in-command
- Stiorra – Uhtred's daughter and wife to Sigtryggr
- Eadith – Æthelred's former lover, now Uhtred's lover

Historical

- Æthelflæd – King Alfred's eldest daughter, Lady of the Mercians
- King Edward – King Alfred's son and King of Wessex
- Æthelstan – son of King Edward from his first wife, Ecgwynn
- Sigtryggr – Danish jarl of Jorvik and Northumbria
- Æthelhelm – King Edward’s father-in-law, and the most powerful Ealdorman in Wessex
- Constantin – Scottish king
