= Hastein =

Viking chieftain of the late 9th century

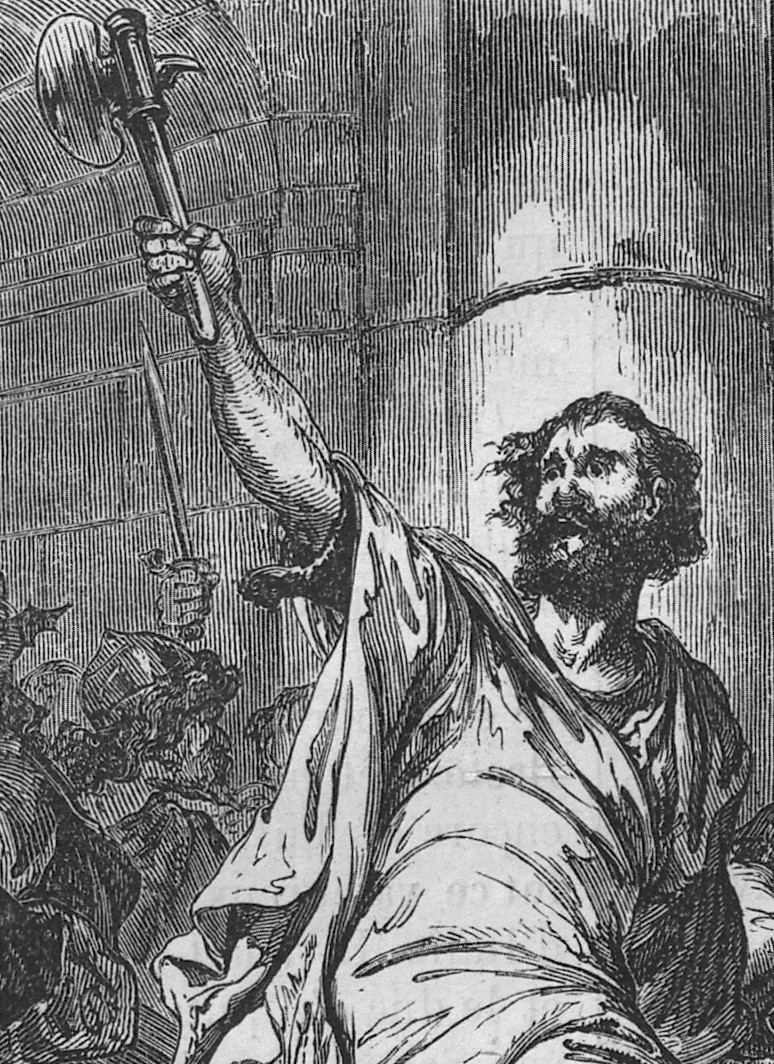
Hastein in Luna, Italy ca 859. Histoire Populaire de la France 1st edition (1862), author: Ch. Lahure

Hastein (Old Norse: Hásteinn, also recorded as Hastingus, Anstign, Haesten, Hæsten, Hæstenn or Hæsting and alias Alsting) was a Viking chieftain of the late 9th century who made several raiding voyages.

== Early life ==
Little is known of Hastein's early life. The origins of Hasting are obscure, and the sources regarding them are contradictory. The Icelandic sagas state that he was a native of Norway and was driven from the country by King Harald Fairhair, though they disagree on the identity of his father. The Landnámabók identifies Hasting as the son of Atle, the jarl (earl) of Gaular in Sogn, a small kingdom in western Norway. The Eyrbyggja saga, by contrast, names his father as Thorulf. He is described as a Dane in the Anglo-Saxon Chronicle. William of Jumièges, a Norman chronicler, who describes Hasting as being of Danish origin too, reports that he served as the "tutor" to Björn Ironside, one of the sons of the legendary Viking leader Ragnar Lodbrok. He is said to have accompanied his charge into exile.

The 11th-century Burgundian chronicler Raoul Glaber suggests he was born in the region of Troyes. Historian Michel Dillange supports this view theorizing that around the year 800, Charlemagne relocated many Saxons and Danes to Christian lands to prevent rebellion in Saxony. Hastein may have been born around 810 to one of these families, later discovering his heritage and returning to Scandinavia, where he rose to become a notable ship captain and Viking leader. But there is not a single trace of any Saxon or Scandinavian settlement in Champagne and Burgundy and these countries, located very far away from any ocean, have no heritage related to maritime life or naval techniques. According to historian Pierre Bouet, this claim is clearly the result of a misunderstanding on Glaber's part and at odds with sources identifying him as Scandinavian.

Hastein is credited with being involved with various raids on the divided Frankish Empire. He also reportedly led a great raid into the Mediterranean in 859.

For indeed the Frankish nation, which was crushed by the avenger Anstign [Hastein], was very full of filthy uncleanness. Treasonous and oath-breaking, they were deservedly condemned; unbelievers and faithless, they were justly punished ... Dudo of St. Quentin's. Gesta Normannorum. Book 1. Chapter 3.

== Spain and the Mediterranean ==
During 859–862, Hastein jointly led an expedition with Björn Ironside. A fleet of 62 ships sailed from the Loire to raid countries in the Mediterranean.

At first the raiding did not go well, with Hastein being defeated by the Asturians and later the Muslims of the Umayyad Emirate of Córdoba at Niebla in 859. Success followed with the sacking of Algeciras, where the mosque was burned, and then the ravaging of Mazimma in the Idrisid Caliphate on the north coast of Africa, followed by further raids into the Umayyad Caliphate at Orihuela, the Balearic Islands and Roussillon. They occupied Nekor for 8 days.

Hastein and Björn wintered at Camargue island on the mouth of the Rhone before ravaging Narbonne, Nîmes and Arles, then as far north as Valence, before moving onto Italy. There they attacked the city of Luna. Believing it to be Rome, Hastein had his men carry him to the gate and tell the guards he was dying and wished to convert to Christianity. Once inside, he was taken to the town's church where he received the sacraments, before jumping from his stretcher and leading his men in a sack of the town. Another account has him claiming to want to convert before he died, and feigning death on the following day. Luna allowed his body and 50 of his men clad in robes enter for his burial. Hastein's men had concealed swords under their robes, and once inside Hastein leaped from his coffin, decapitated the priest and sacked the city. However, the veracity of this is much debated. He sailed down the coast and sacked Pisa and, sailing on the River Arno, ravaged Fiesole. The fleet then possibly raided the Byzantine Empire's territories in the eastern Mediterranean.

On the way back to the Loire, he stopped off in North Africa where he bought several African slaves (known to the Vikings as 'blámenn', blue men, possibly Soussians or Tuaregs) whom he sold in Ireland. They were presumed to have lost 40 ships in a storm, and lost two more at the Straits of Gibraltar on their way home, near Medina-Sidonia, but still managed to ravage Pamplona before returning home to the Loire with 20 ships.

== Loire and Seine ==
Settled back in Brittany, Hastein allied himself with Salomon, King of Brittany against the Franks in 866, and as part of a Viking-Breton army he killed Robert the Strong at the Battle of Brissarthe near Châteauneuf-sur-Sarthe. In 867 he went on to ravage Bourges and a year later attacked Orléans. Peace lasted until spring 872 when the Viking fleet sailed up the Maine and occupied Angers, which led to a siege by the Frankish king Charles the Bald and a peace being agreed in October 873.

Hastein remained in the Loire country until 882, when he was finally expelled by Charles and relocated his army north to the Seine. There he stayed until the Franks besieged Paris and his territory in the Picardy was threatened. It was at this point he became one of many experienced Vikings to look to England for riches and plunder.

== Count of Chartres ==
In 879, Hastein beat Carloman II in battle, to appease the raider, Hastein was made Count of Chartres by Carloman II in 882. he held this title until 886 when he sold it to go raid England.

== England ==
Hastein crossed to England from Boulogne in 892 leading one of two great companies. His army, the smaller of the two, landed in 80 ships and occupied the royal village of Milton Regis near Sittingbourne in Kent, whilst his allies landed at Appledore with 250 ships. Alfred the Great positioned a Wessex army between them to keep them from uniting, the result of which was that Hastein agreed terms, including allowing his two sons to be baptised, and left Kent for Essex. The larger army attempted to reunite with Hastein after raiding Hampshire and Berkshire in the late spring of 893, but was defeated at Farnham by an army under Edward, Alfred's son. The survivors eventually reached Hastein's army at Mersea Island, after a combined Wessex and Mercian army failed to dislodge them from their fortress at Thorney.

As a result, Hastein combined his forces from Appledore and Milton and withdrew them to a fortified camp at Benfleet, Essex. He used this camp as a base to raid Mercia. However, while his main force was out raiding in 894, the fort was attacked by the bolstered militia of eastern Wessex, who defeated the garrison in the Battle of Benfleet. The entire fort, along with the Danes' families – including Hastein's wife and sons – was captured, along with their ships. Hastein re-established his combined force at a new fort, at Shoebury in eastern Essex, and sent for reinforcements from the Danish kingdoms of East Anglia and York. Shortly afterwards, according to the Anglo-Saxon Chronicle, Hastein held talks with Alfred, possibly to discuss terms for the release of his family. Hastein had his two sons returned to him. According to the Anglo-Saxon Chronicle, this was because Hastein's sons had been baptised in early 893, with Alfred and his son-in-law Aethelred of Mercia as sponsors. Thus Alfred was godfather to one boy and Aethelred godfather to the other.

The negotiations apparently achieved little because, shortly afterwards, Hastein launched a second raid along the Thames valley and from there along the River Severn. Hastein was pursued all the way by Aethelred and a combined Mercian and Wessex army, reinforced by a contingent of warriors from the Welsh kingdoms. Eventually the Viking army was trapped at a place called Buttington—possibly the island by that name on the Severn, near Welshpool, Powys. At the subsequent Battle of Buttington, several weeks later, Hastein's forces fought their way out, with many casualties, and returned to the fortress at Shoebury. According to the annals:

after many weeks had passed, some of the heathen [Vikings] died of hunger, but some, having by then eaten their horses, broke out of the fortress, and joined battle with those who were on the east bank of the river. But, when many thousands of pagans had been slain, and all the others had been put to flight, the Christians [English] were masters of the place of death. In that battle the most noble Ordheah and many of the king's thegns were killed ...

In mid-893, Hastein's forces moved their camp from East Anglia, to the ruined Roman fortress at Chester. Hastein apparently planned to rebuild the fortifications and use it as a base for raiding northern Mercia. However, the Mercians had other ideas, they laid siege to the fortress and attempted to starve the Danes out by removing or retrieving any livestock and destroying any crops in the area.

In late 893, the besieged army left Chester, marching to South Wales and devastated the kingdoms of Brycheiniog, Gwent and Glywysing over several months. In mid-894, they left, possibly by sea, since they returned to the Chester area, in a circuitous route encompassing the Danish strongholds of Northumbria, the Five Burghs, and East Anglia, before reaching their fort at Mersea Island.

Moving to south-east England in late 894, Hastein's army towed their ships up the Thames to a fort they constructed on the River Lea. However, in mid-895, a Wessex army arrived, led by Alfred, and built a pair of forts on both sides of the Lea, blocking Hastein's access to the Thames and the sea. The Danes abandoned their camp, returned their families to East Anglia and made another great march, across the West Midlands, to a site on the Severn (where Bridgnorth now stands), followed all the way by hostile forces. There they stayed until early-mid 896, when Hastein's army dissolved. Its former members retreated to East Anglia and Northumbria, except – according to the Anglo-Saxon Chronicle – those that were penniless, who found ships and set out to raid Austrasia via the Seine.

== Legacy ==
Hastein disappeared from history in around 896, by then an old man having already been described as "the lusty and terrifying old warrior of the Loire and the Somme", when he arrived in England several years earlier. He was one of the most notorious and successful Vikings of all time, having raided dozens of cities across many kingdoms in Europe and North Africa.

The Picard monk Dudo of Saint-Quentin was very critical of Hastein:

This was a man accursed: fierce, mightily cruel, and savage, pestilent, hostile, sombre, truculent, given to outrage, pestilent and untrustworthy, insolent, fickle and lawless. Death-dealing, uncouth, fertile in ruses, warmonger-general, traitor, fomenter of evil, and double-dyed dissimulator ... Dudo of St. Quentin's. Gesta Normannorum. Book 1. Chapter 3.

He is identified with the Jarl Hasting who held the Channel Islands for a while.

Some scholars have suggested that the Hastings area of Sussex in England may have been founded by a forebear of Hastein.
