= The Church of Jesus Christ of Latter-day Saints in Germany =

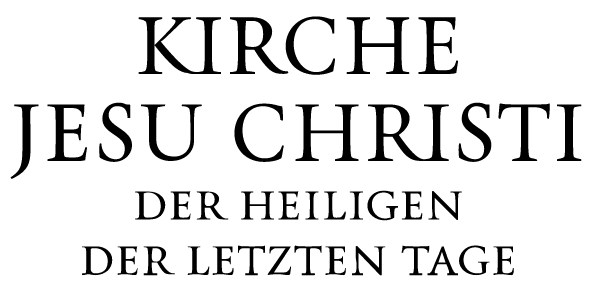
- (Logo in German)

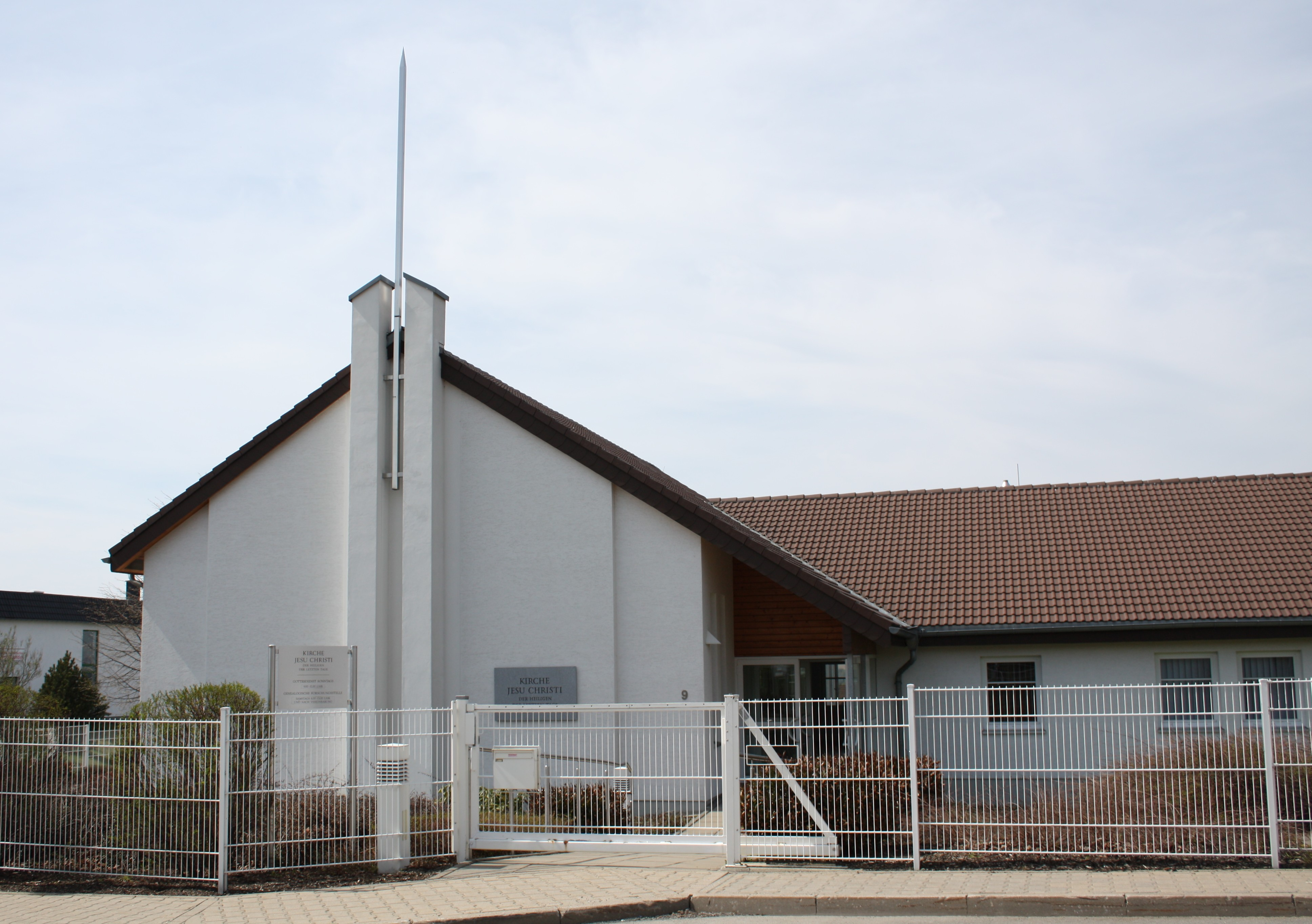
- An LDS meetinghouse in Annaberg-Buchholz, Germany
- Area: Europe Central
- Members: 39,975 (2025)
- Stakes: 14
- Wards: 97
- Branches: 49
- Total congregations: 146
- Missions: 4
- Temples: 2 operating; 1 announced; 3 total
- FamilySearch Centers: 99

The Church of Jesus Christ of Latter-day Saints in Germany refers to the Church of Jesus Christ of Latter-day Saints (LDS Church) and its members in Germany.

The LDS Church reported 39,975 members in 2025. In 2010, nationwide active membership was estimated between 9,000 and 11,000, or 25-30% of total church membership.

== History ==
Membership in Germany
Year	Membership
1930	11,828
1940	13,481
1950	15,530
1960	16,656
1970	22,247
1980	28,496
1989*	32,000
1999	36,303
2009	37,539
2019	39,724
2025	39,975
1989 membership was published as a rounded number. Source: Windall J. Ashton; Jim M. Wall (eds.), Deseret News, various years, Church Almanac Country Information: Germany https://newsroom.churchofjesuschrist.org/facts-and-statistics/country/germany

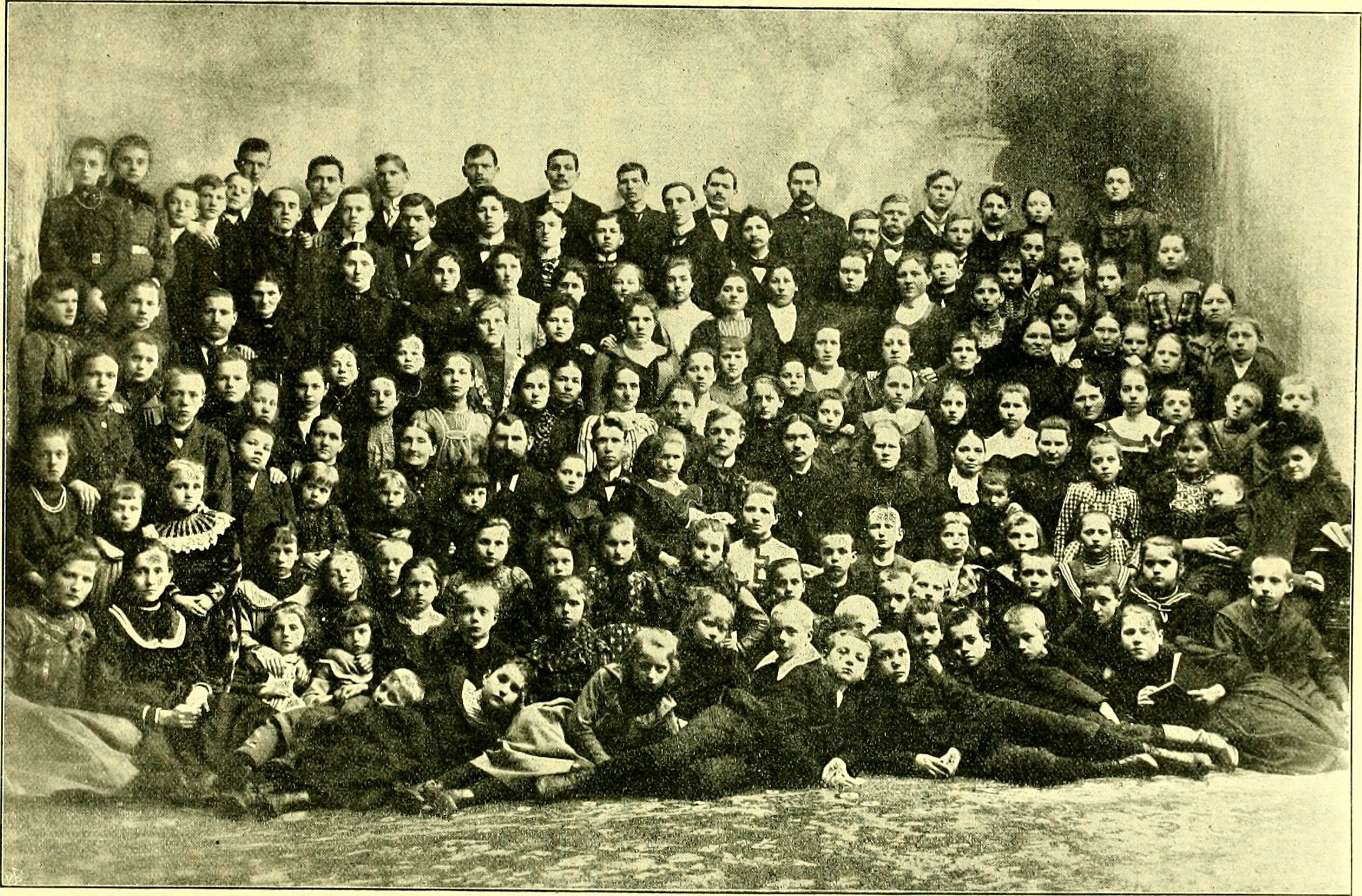
Koenigsberg Sunday School (1902)

=== 1840s-1900 First missionaries and persecution ===
The first German to be converted to the LDS Church was an immigrant to the United States named Jakob Zundel in 1836.

Although one British Mormon convert had briefly worked in Germany, the first official of the church to arrive in Germany was Orson Hyde on 27 June 1841 as part of his journey to Palestine. He was delayed in Frankfurt by a visa problem and began to learn German. When he returned to Germany on his trip back from Palestine, he was in Regensburg from January to August 1842 and wrote "Ein Ruf aus der Wüste" ("A Cry out of the Wilderness") while there. It was published in Frankfurt and was the first LDS Church publication in the German language.

The first converts were baptized in Germany in 1851. Brigham Young sent Daniel Carn to establish the first German mission in 1852, which he did in Hamburg. Carn also oversaw the publication of a German-language version of the Book of Mormon which was published in Hamburg on 25 May 1852. He was eventually banished from Hamburg, then a sovereign state, due to his attempts to convert Germans to Mormonism but he continued to proselytise Germans in the then-Danish territory of Schleswig-Holstein.

Most early converts emigrated to the United States, depleting the local population of Latter-day Saints. In 1853, Prussia banned Mormonism and in 1854 the short-lived Hamburg branch was dissolved, with the German Mission closed in 1855. The church's involvement in Germany resumed in 1860 (under the auspices of various iterations of the Swiss Mission until the German Mission was reopened in 1898) but was limited due to persecution and the arrests of missionaries. Following German unification in 1871 some local areas of Germany became less restrictive towards missionary work and, in 1875, Joseph F. Smith declared that missionary work should recommence in Germany regardless of any opposition. This enabled a gradual increase in baptisms, with there being 280 LDS Church members in Germany in 1880 and conversions would average 300 a year over the next two decades.

=== 1900-1945 Membership Growth and the Second World War ===
With increasing numbers of members, persecution began to increase as well (in 1903 Prussia and Mecklenburg both banished missionaries from their kingdoms) and in 1904 the German Mission was again closed and large scale missionary work wouldn't return until after World War I.

In the first half of the 20th century, Germany had more converts to Mormonism than any other non-English speaking country. By 1925 there were 6,125 members in the German-Austrian Mission, and 5,305 members in the Swiss-German Mission. The first German LDS meeting house was built in 1929 in Selbongen, East Prussia (now Zełwągi in Poland).

As of 1939, 13,402 Mormons lived in the West German (including Austria as of November 1938) and East German Missions. After Adolf Hitler's rise to power, no Mormon congregation was stopped from worshipping during the Nazi Government of 1933 to 1945 and few individual Mormons were persecuted (and only for transgressions that any German of the time would have been punished for). American Mormon missionaries' views of the government during the 1930s varied. While praising Hitler's oratory skill and approving of his unifying a politically divided country, they saw arrests of dissidents, enforcement of Nazi eugenics, and widespread fear of the regime. In 1933 Oliver H. Budge, mission president of the German-Austrian Mission, told the Gestapo that the church was politically neutral and obeyed the law; his successor Roy A. Welker again did so in 1934, citing the 12th Article of Faith. While visiting Germany in 1937, church president Heber J. Grant urged members to avoid politics and focus on their faith.

Nazi officials nonetheless classified the church as a sekte to investigate for sedition. The Gestapo warned the church in 1936 against anti-Nazi sentiment among members. Some missionaries were arrested, pamphlets were confiscated, and the Nazi Propaganda Ministry banned the Articles of Faith. The church hoped that accepting a request of missionaries coaching the Germany men's national basketball team at the 1936 Berlin Olympics would improve relations. The government nonetheless seriously considered banning the church, but did not because of Mormonism's international connections. A 1938 Gestapo report for Nazi leader Alfred Rosenberg concluded that because of Mormon principles of "glorification of Judaism" and belief in modern-day prophets and revelations, "the doctrine of the Mormons is incompatible with the National Socialist worldview".

Gestapo agents silently attended services, likely investigating neighbors' complaints of seditious activities, but no punishment came to the church. Speakers avoided criticizing the government or, after the German declaration of war against the United States, emphasizing the church's relationship with that country. The government ordered the church to avoid preaching about "Jewish" topics like "Zion" and "Israel", so leaders told members to not sing hymns with such words.

The Nuremberg Laws increased access to and interest in genealogical records, and some saw the monthly eintopf as similar to Fast Sunday, but mandatory Hitler Youth membership ended most Mormon auxiliary organizations for young people. German Mormons "categorically refuse to use" the Nazi salute, according to the Gestapo, and the Rosenberg report found that the majority of Mormons showed "no interest in political events and current affairs". About 5% of church members—half the rate of the general population—joined the Nazi Party, required of state employees. A few church members openly opposed the regime—Helmuth Hübener ended up being beheaded for anti-Nazi activities and his friend Karl-Heinz Schnibbe spent five years in a camp for his part Hübener was the youngest opponent of Nazi Germany to be sentenced to death by the infamous Special People's Court (Volksgerichtshof) and executed.

At least 996 members were killed during World War II, including more than 400 adult men, about 10% of priesthood holders.

=== 1946-2020s Cold War and the 21st Century ===
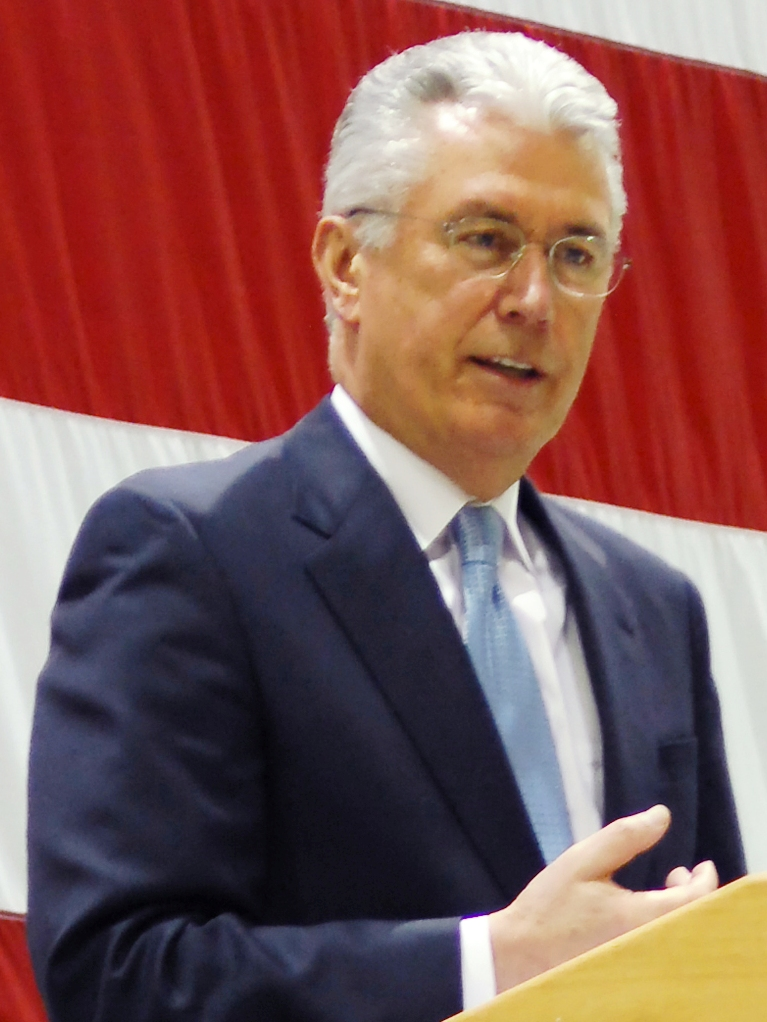
Elder Dieter F. Uchtdorf, a German Aviator, became an Apostle for the LDS Church in 2004.

Following World War II, then Apostle Ezra Taft Benson arrived in Europe to organise aid for church members. He visited Germany many times, saw the terrible conditions people were living in and arranged aid shipments to offer some relief.

During the Cold War, members of the church in Germany found themselves divided among two nations. Members continued to maintain contact with the church in the west. In the fall of 1961 three stakes were created in Berlin (Germany's first), Stuttgart and Hamburg. In 1982, the Freiberg German Democratic Republic Stake was created. On June 19, 1985, the Freiberg GDR Temple was dedicated. It is the only temple to have been constructed in what was a communist bloc country. In 1987, the Frankfurt Germany Temple was dedicated.

== Stakes ==
As of December 2025, the following stakes had congregations in Germany:

Stake	Organized	Mission	Temple
Berlin Germany	10 Sep 1961	Germany Berlin	Freiberg Germany
Dortmund Germany	19 Sep 1976	Germany Hamburg	Frankfurt Germany
Dresden Germany	29 Aug 1982	Germany Berlin	Freiberg Germany
Düsseldorf Germany	4 Jun 1972	Germany Hamburg	Frankfurt Germany
Frankfurt Germany	12 Sep 1976	Germany Frankfurt	Frankfurt Germany
Friedrichsdorf Germany	22 Jun 2014	Germany Frankfurt	Frankfurt Germany
Hamburg Germany	12 Nov 1961	Germany Hamburg	Frankfurt Germany
Hannover Germany	12 Jun 1977	Germany Hamburg	Frankfurt Germany
Heidelberg Germany	7 Feb 1982	Germany Frankfurt	Frankfurt Germany
Kaiserslautern Germany (English)	3 Nov 1968	Germany Frankfurt	Frankfurt Germany
Leipzig Germany	3 Jun 1984	Germany Berlin	Freiberg Germany
Munich Germany	23 Oct 1977	Alpine German-Speaking	Frankfurt Germany
Nürnberg Germany	20 March 1994	Germany Frankfurt	Frankfurt Germany
St Gallen Switzerland*	6 May 2007	Alpine German-Speaking	Bern Switzerland
Stuttgart Germany	26 Oct 1961	Germany Frankfurt	Frankfurt Germany
Zürich Switzerland*	29 Oct 1961	Alpine German-Speaking	Bern Switzerland

- *Stake centered outside of Germany with congregations in Germany.

== Missions ==
- Germany Berlin Mission
- Germany Frankfurt Mission
- Germany Hamburg Mission
- Alpine German-speaking Mission (based in Munich and covers Austria, parts of Switzerland, and portions of southern Germany)

== Temples ==
Temples in Germany
Red = Operating
Yellow = Announced
Blue = Under Construction
Black = Closed for Renovations

33. Freiberg Germany Temple; Official website; News & images	
Location: Announced: Groundbreaking: Dedicated: Rededicated: Size: Style: Notes:	Freiberg, Germany; 9 October 1982 by Spencer W. Kimball; 23 April 1983 by Thomas S. Monson; 29 June 1985 by Gordon B. Hinckley; 7 September 2002 by Gordon B. Hinckley; 21,500 sq ft (2,000 m^{2}) on a 3.58-acre (1.45 ha) site Modern, single-spire design with German influence and use of Gothic-style arches - designed by Emil B. Fetzer and Rolf Metzner; Originally without an angel Moroni statue, one was installed as part of the 2001–2002 renovations. It is the only temple ever to have been located behind the Iron Curtain.
41. Frankfurt Germany Temple; Official website; News & images	
Location: Announced: Groundbreaking: Dedicated: Rededicated: Size: Style:	Friedrichsdorf, Germany; 1 April 1981 by Spencer W. Kimball; 1 July 1985 by Gordon B. Hinckley; 28 August 1987 by Ezra Taft Benson; 20 October 2019 by Dieter F. Uchtdorf; 32,895 sq ft (3,056.0 m^{2}) on a 5.6-acre (2.3 ha) site Modern, detached single-spire design - designed by Church A&E Services and Borchers-Metzner-Kramer
321. Hamburg Germany Temple (Site announced); Official website; News & images	
Location: Announced:	Hamburg, Germany; 2 April 2023 by Russell M. Nelson on a 1.4-acre (0.57 ha) site

== See also ==
- Religion in Germany
- Helmuth Hübener
- Truth & Treason (2025) film
