= Alan Keele =

American Mormon bishop

Alan Frank Keele (born November 17, 1942) is an American writer and languages and humanities professor. Keele teaches at Brigham Young University (BYU) where he is the Ludwig-Weber-Siebach Chair of German and Humanities and has previously served as chair of the Department of Germanic and Slavic Languages and associate dean of Honors and General Education. Keele has written a number of works on postwar German literature and on topics related to Mormonism. His book on Helmuth Hübener was made into a PBS documentary.

== Early life and education ==
Keele was born in Provo and attended school in Springville, Utah, Laramie, Wyoming, Spanish Fork, Utah, and Bicknell, Utah, where he graduated from Wayne High School in 1960. Keele initially attended the University of Utah with the intent to major in chemistry. After his missionary service, Keele attended BYU, where he received a B.A. in German and History in 1967. He received a Ph.D. in German Language and Literature from Princeton University in 1971.

== Career ==
At BYU, Keele has chaired the Department of Germanic and Slavic Languages and was associate dean of Honors and General Education. He has served on numerous departmental, college, university and professional committees and councils, contributing to the development of BYU's academics and services. Keele has participated in the Modern Language Association, the American Council of Teachers of Foreign Language, the German Studies Association, and has chaired the German section of the Rocky Mountain Modern Language Association.

At BYU, Keele has taught German language and literature, and some honors and humanities courses. He received several honors for his academic work, including Honors Professor of the Year in 1992, the Abraham O. Smoot citizenship award in 1995, the Karl G. Maeser General Education Professorship in 1996, and the Alcuin award in 2007. He is currently the Ludwig-Weber-Siebach Chair of German and Humanities.

Among other publications Keele has collaborated with Douglas F. Tobler, Blair R. Holmes and Karl-Heinz Schnibbe in writing about the activities of Helmuth Hübener and his associates in defying Hitler. Keele has also written on the works of Günter Grass.

== Personal life ==
Keele is a member of the Church of Jesus Christ of Latter-day Saints (LDS Church) for which he served as a missionary for 30 months in Germany, from 1962 to 1964. He has also served in other roles in the church, including as a branch president, a bishop, and twice as a high councilor.

Keele is married to Linda Kay Sellers and they have six children.

Keele has participated in various community and civic activities, including on the board of Utahns United Against the Nuclear Arms Race, on the Area Advisory Council for the Alpine School District, and as chair of the Utah Democratic Forum. With professor Donald K. Jarvis, Keele co-chaired Russian Relief, an organization to collect food and money to help Soviet citizens in need in the early 1990s, for which he received attention from The New York Times.

== Published works ==
Keele has published on postwar German literature, on various social history topics, and two vocabulary dictionaries. He contributed to translations of the 55 Sonnets to Orpheus and the ten Duino Elegies of Rainer Maria Rilke, and Walter Kempowski's novel Dog Days. He also created a 10,000 page concordance of the works of Kempowski.

Keele has also written on topics of interest to the Latter-day Saint community, such as pre-existence and the Mormon resistance movement in Nazi Germany. His book on Helmuth Hübener was made into a PBS documentary by KBYU. HÜBENER, a major motion picture with a former working title of "Truth and Treason," starring Haley Joel Osment, has been stalled in "current projects" status since 2008. For his body of work, Keele received a Special Award in Criticism from the Association for Mormon Letters in 2008. With Marvin H. Folsom, Keele has contributed to foreign language texts based on the Bible and the Book of Mormon.

The following is a list of some of Keele's publications:

- Keele, Alan (1971). Don Quixote in Cologne: An Introduction to the Life and Works of Paul Schallück. [doctoral dissertation]. Princeton University..
- Keele, Alan (1976). Paul Schallück and the Post-War German Don Quixote: A Case-History Prolegomenon to the Literature of the Federal Republic. Utah Studies in Literature and Linguistics. Vol. 5.
- Folsom, Marvin K.; Keele, Alan F. (1978). Learn German Through the Book of Mormon. [audio cassette]. Provo, Utah: Brigham Young University..
- Keele, Alan F. (November–December 1980). "The Fuhrer's New Clothes: Helmuth Hubener and the Mormons in the Third Reich" (PDF). Sunstone. 5 (6): 20–29.
- Keele, Alan (July–August 1981). "Trailing Clouds of Glory?" (PDF). Sunstone. 6 (4): 47–51.
- Keele, Alan (1983). The Apocalyptic Vision: A Thematic Exploration of Postwar German Literature. Potomac, Maryland: Studia Humanitatis. ISBN 0-935568-40-9.
- Folsom, Marvin H.; Keele, Alan F. (1983). German Core Vocabulary in Context: A Pedagogical Dictionary for Beginning Students of German. Provo, Utah: Interlinguistica.
- Schnibbe, Karl-Heinz; Keele, Alan F.; Tobler, Douglas F. (1984). The Price: The True Story of a Mormon Who Defied Hitler. Salt Lake City, Utah: Bookcraft. ISBN 0-88494-534-0..
- Keele, Alan F. (1988). Understanding Günter Grass. Columbia: University of South Carolina Press. ISBN 0-87249-546-9.
- Rilke, Rainer Maria; Norris, Leslie; Keele, Alan (1989). The Sonnets to Orpheus. Columbia, South Carolina: Camden House. ISBN 0-938100-65-3..
- Holmes, Blair R.; Keele, Alan F. (1995). When Truth Was Treason: German Youth Against Hitler: The Story of the Helmuth Hübener Group. Urbana: University of Illinois Press. ISBN 0-252-02201-7.
- Keele, Alan (1995–96). "The World is Charged With the Grandeur of God: A Mandate for Eternal Education". Speeches. Brigham Young University: 239–247. Archived from the original on 2008-10-27.
- Keele, Alan (2003). In Search of the Supernal: Pre-Existence, Eternal Marriage, and Apotheosis in German Literary, Operatic, and Cinematic texts. Münster: Agenda Verlag. ISBN 3-89688-183-3.
- Keele, Alan (2003). "A Latter-day Saint in Hitler's SS: The True Story of a Mormon Youth Who Joined and Defected From the Infamous SchutzStaffel". BYU Studies. 42 (3 & 4): 21–28.
- Keele, Alan (2004). "Toward an Anthropology of Apotheosis in Mozart's Magic Flute: A Demonstration of the Artistic Universality and Vitality of Certain "Peculiar" Latter-day Saint Doctrines". BYU Studies. 43 (3): 43–83.
- Keele, Alan (2004). "Poesis and the Great Tree of Being: A Holistic Reading of Rilke's Sonette an Orpheus". In Erica A. Metzger and Michael M. Metzger (ed.). A Companion to the Works of Rainer Maria Rilke. Columbia, South Carolina: Camden House. ISBN 1-57113-302-X.
- Rilke, Rainer Maria; Norris, Leslie; Keele, Alan (2008). Two Rilke Poems. Provo, Utah: Tryst Press..

== Sources ==
- Alan Keele at the MLCA Database
- Barnes and Noble listing of books by Keele
