= Hitler Youth: Growing Up in Hitler's Shadow =

2005 non-fiction children's book by Susan Campbell Bartoletti

Hitler Youth: Growing up in Hitler's Shadow
- Author: Susan Campbell Bartoletti
- Language: English
- Genre: Nonfiction
- Publisher: Scholastic Nonfiction
- Publication date: April 1, 2005
- ISBN: 9780439353793

Hitler Youth: Growing up in Hitler's Shadow is a non-fiction children's book written by Susan Campbell Bartoletti, and published in 2005. It received the Newbery Honor medal in 2006.

The book is a study of the Hitler Youth, a paramilitary organization of children and young people dedicated to furthering the aims of the Third Reich, and was organized around interviews with 12 former members and their experiences in the organization.

One episode of the book is fleshed out into her novel The Boy Who Dared, about Helmuth Hübener, the youngest person to be sentenced to death by the Nazis during World War II.

== Members featured ==
The twelve former Hitler Youth members mainly featured in this book are:

- Alfons Heck
- Helmuth Günther Guddat Hübener
- Dagobert "Bert" Lewyn
- Melita Maschmann
- Henry Friedrich Carl Metelmann
- Herbert Norkus
- Karl-Heinz Schnibbe
- Elisabeth Vetter
- Rudolf "Rudi" Gustav Wobbe
- Inge Scholl
- Hans Fritz Scholl
- Sophie Magdalena Scholl

== Reception ==
Hitler Youth received starred reviews from Publishers Weekly and Booklist. The book also received the following accolades:

- Newbery Medal Nominee (2006)
- Sibert Medal Nominee (2006)
- NCTE Orbis Pictus Honor Book (2006)
- Notable Children's Books (2006)
- American Library Association Best Books for Young Adults (2006)
- Booklist's Top of the List (2005)
- Booklist Editors' Choice: Books for Youth (2005)
