= Bradenham, Buckinghamshire =

Village and civil parish in Buckinghamshire, England

Coordinates: 51.6660°N 0.8085°W

Bradenham
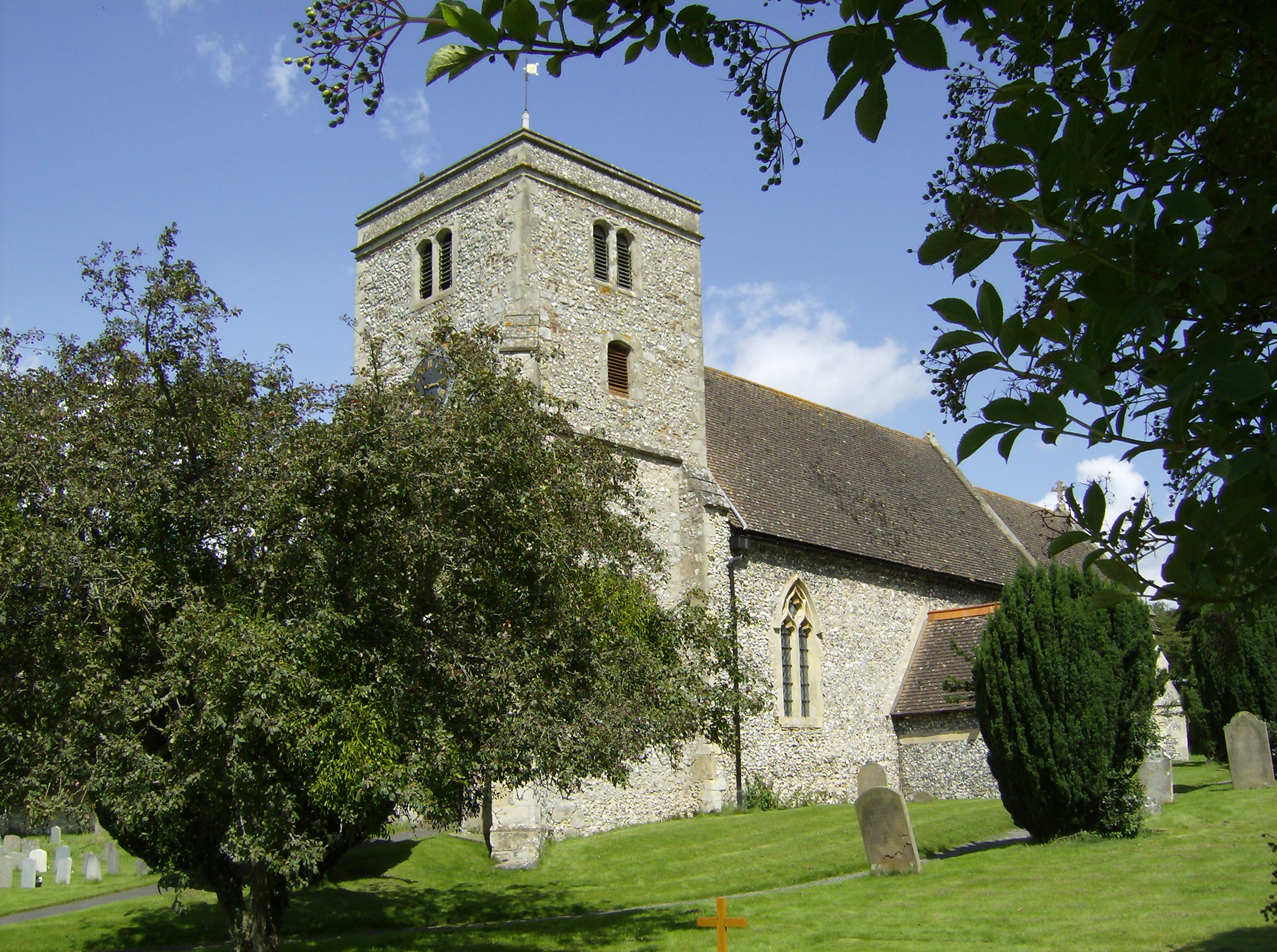
- St Botolph's Church, Bradenham

- Location within Buckinghamshire
- Population: 536 (2011 Census)
- OS grid reference: SU823971
- Unitary authority: Buckinghamshire
- Ceremonial county: Buckinghamshire
- Region: South East
- Country: England
- Sovereign state: United Kingdom
- Post town: HIGH WYCOMBE
- Postcode district: HP14
- Dialling code: 01494
- Police: Thames Valley
- Fire: Buckinghamshire
- Ambulance: South Central
- UK Parliament: Wycombe

Bradenham is a village and civil parish in Buckinghamshire, England. It is near Saunderton, off the main A4010 road between Princes Risborough and High Wycombe.

== Village ==
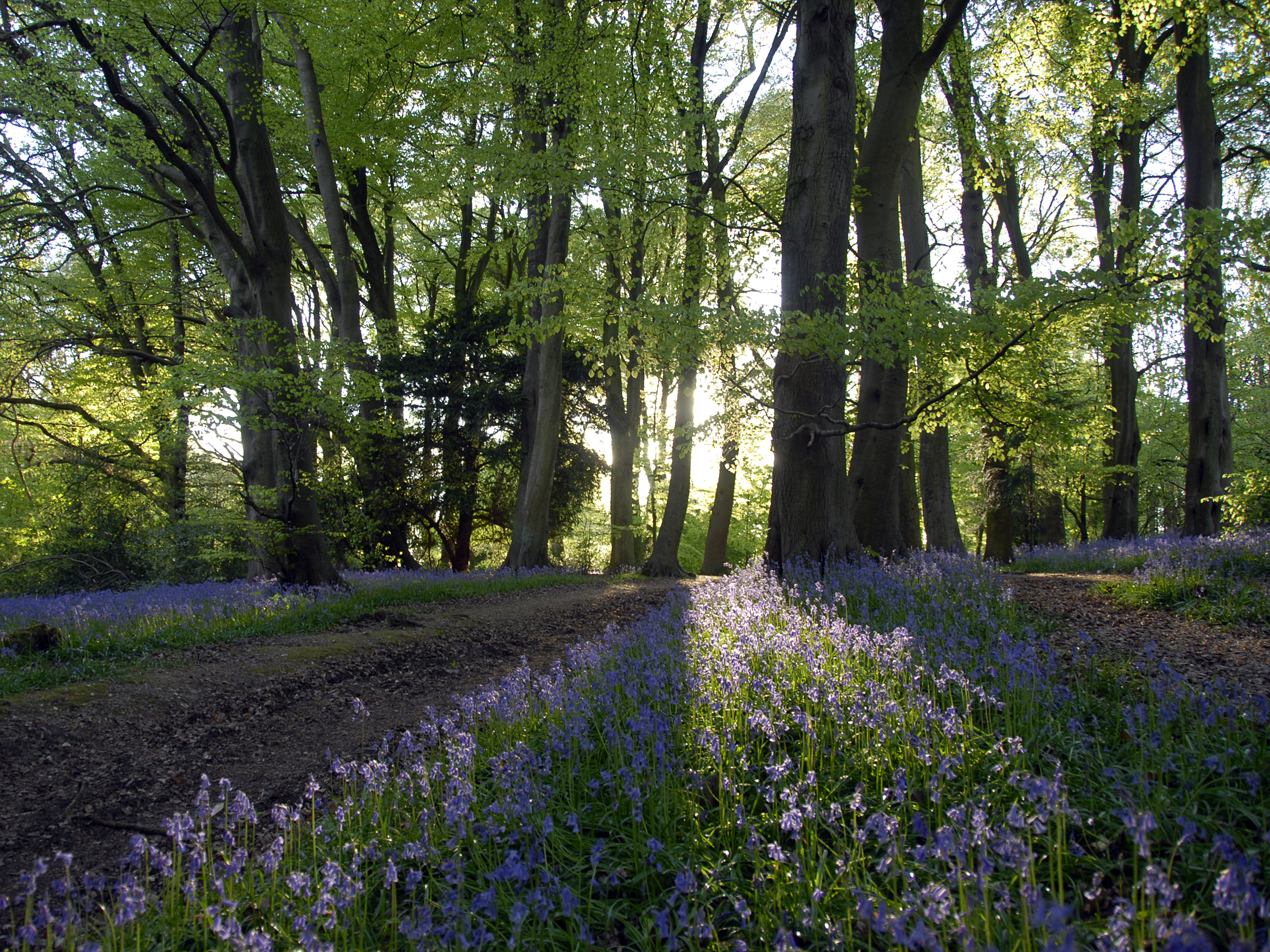
Bluebells in Bradenham Woods, Buckinghamshire

The village name is Anglo-Saxon and means 'broad enclosure', referring to the fact that the village sits in a broad valley among the surrounding Chiltern Hills. In the Domesday Book of 1086, the village was recorded as Bradeham.

The Parish Church of St Botolph was restored in 1863 by G.E. Street and the south door dates from the early Norman period. The rectory on the main road is from the 18th century. The houses around the village green are mainly brick and flint, but include the distinctive 18th century stuccoed 'White House' with pointed windows and castellations.

The whole village of Bradenham has been owned by the National Trust since 1956. They market it under the name Bradenham Village. In front of the manor house is a small, slightly sloping cricket pitch which is used by Bradenham Cricket Club. Village news and activities are documented in the monthly "Contact" magazine, which covers Bradenham plus the nearby villages of Bledlow Ridge, West Wycombe, Radnage and Piddington.

=== Royal Air Force ===
RAF High Wycombe is inside the village, to the north-east. The Strike Command Operations Centre (STCOC) formerly the Primary War Headquarters (PWHQ) bunker was built by RAF Strike Command on the National Trust land to the north east of the village between 1983 and 1985, in spite of opposition including a peace camp.

== Manor house ==
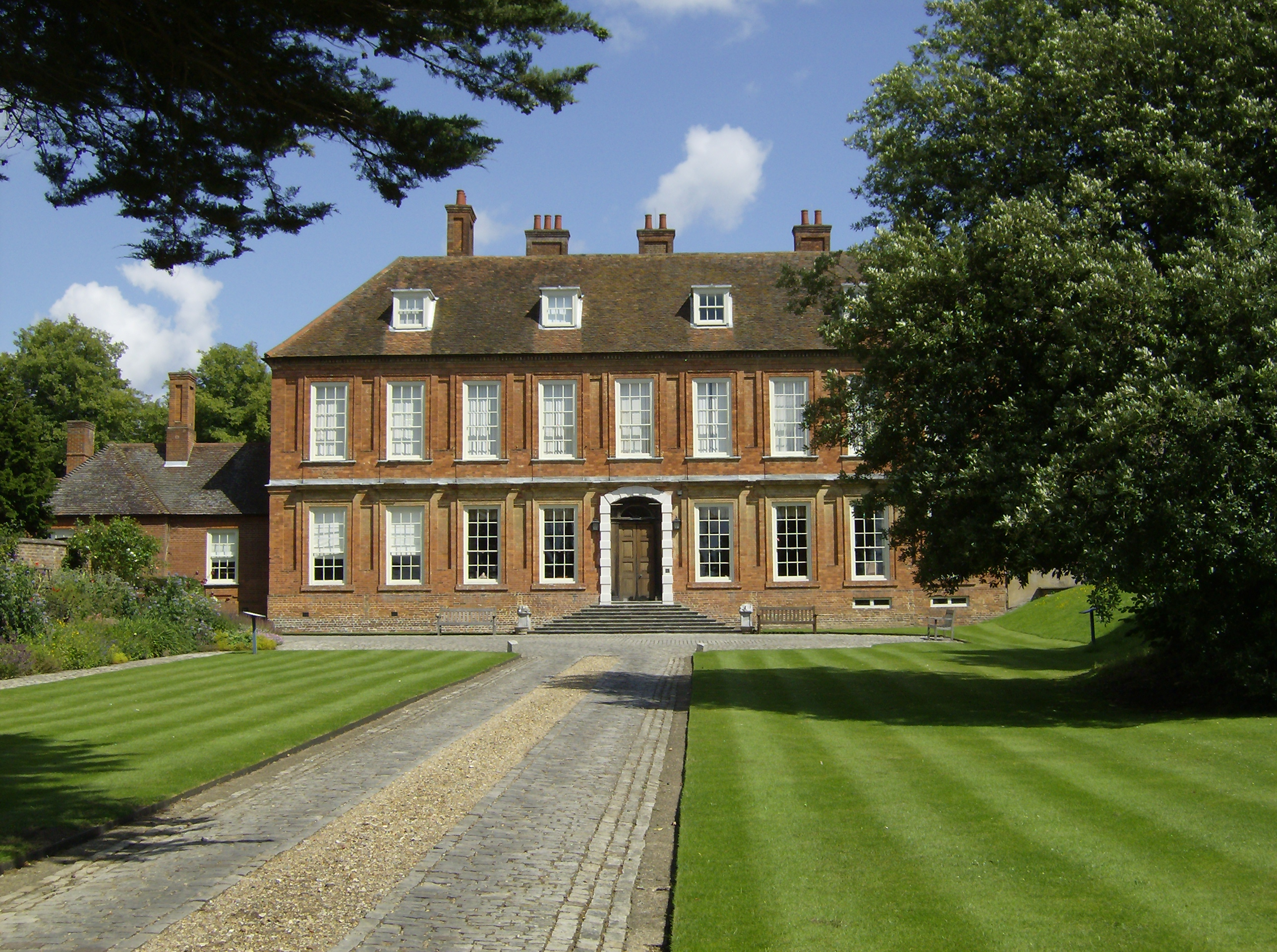
Bradenham Manor

Bradenham is the location of a grand red brick manor house, which in the 13th century was a property belonging to the Earl of Warwick. The house was fit for royalty, as in 1566 Queen Elizabeth I was entertained here by Lord Windsor. The current manor house was substantially built by Sir Edmund Pye, 1st Baronet around 1670 with tall sash windows, steep roofs and slim brick chimneys. In the 19th century it was the home of Isaac D'Israeli who died there in 1848 and is buried in the churchyard. His son Benjamin Disraeli, who became the prime minister, lived there for part of his early life. In the later Victorian era, the house was turned into a boarding school for local young gentlemen. In recent years, Bradenham Manor was leased by the National Trust to Grant Thornton UK LLP as the firm's National Training Centre. However, the manor has now been returned to the National Trust. It is well known for its gardens.

It featured as the 'Wargames Headquarters' in the 1967 film, The Dirty Dozen.

== Notable people ==
- Joseph Brooksbank, Anglican clergyman, was the incumbent vicar at Bradenham, 1650 – c. 1658
- Benjamin Disraeli, former Prime Minister
- Isaac D'Israeli
- Giovanni Battista Falcieri, valet and servant to Isaac D'Israeli and Lord Byron
- Philip Rose
