= F. LaMond Tullis =

Floyd LaMond Tullis (born 1935) was a professor of political science and Associate Academic Vice President at Brigham Young University (BYU) from 1969 to 1998. He is a specialist in Latin American Studies and has written multiple works on the Church of Jesus Christ of Latter-day Saints in Latin America, especially Mexico.

As a young man Tullis served as a missionary for The Church of Jesus Christ of Latter-day Saints in the Central American Mission. For part of this time he was a counselor in the mission presidency of the mission. In this position he created a translation of the Melchizedek priesthood handbook into Spanish for use throughout the mission.

Tullis began his undergraduate education at the University of Utah. He later transferred to BYU where he earned a bachelor's degree in Spanish. Tullis received his master's degree in political science from Brigham Young University. He also did graduate studies at Cornell University and earned a master's of public administration degree. Tullis has a doctorate in political science earned at Harvard University. He spent a year teaching at Arizona State University before he joined the BYU faculty. He has been a visiting fellow at the London School of Economics, and the University of Sussex from 1983 to 1984. He was a visiting fellow and the Institute of Developmental Studies at Princeton University in 1990. Over the years Tullis also served as a consultant to the United Nations (including the United Nations Research Institute for Social Development) and the United States State Department.

At BYU Tullis was the chair of the department of political science from 1978 to 1983. From 1985 to 1989 he was associate academic vice president at BYU.

Among the books written by Tullis are Lord and Peasant in Peru, Politics and Social Change in Third World Countries, Mormons in Mexico, The Church Moves Outside the United States: Some Observations from South America, Modernization in Brazil and Handbook of research on the illicit drug trade. Tullis was also the general editor of Mormonism: A Faith For All Cultures. Tullis has also written multiple articles published in BYU Studies related to The Church of Jesus Christ of Latter-day Saints in Latin America. In the early 2010s he developed several articles on the history of the church in Mexico that were published in Spanish on the church's Mexican website. In 2018 his work Martyrs in Mexico: A Mormon Story of Revolution and Redemption was published jointly by BYU's Religious Studies Center and Deseret Book. The later work was reviewed by Ignacio Garcia in the BYU Studies Quarterly who faulted it for focusing too much on the rise of The Church of Jesus Christ of Latter-day Saints as an institution and not enough on private devotional practices.

Tullis is a believing member of The Church of Jesus Christ of Latter-day Saints. For a few years in the 2010s he and his wife were assigned by the Church as missionaries to compile oral histories on the rise of the church in Mexico. He also did extensive field gatherings of material in Mexico related to the history of the Church in both the 1970s and the 1990s.

== Bibliography ==
- Lord and Peasant in Peru: A Paradigm of Political and Social Change (1970)
- Modernization in Brazil (1973)
- Politics and Social Change in Third World Countries (1973)
- Mormonism: A Faith for All Cultures (1978) (general editor, Arthur Henry King, Spencer J. Palmer and Douglas F. Tobler were associate editors)
- Food, the State, and International Political Economy (1986) - with W. Ladd Hollist
- Pursuing Food Security: Strategies and Obstacles in Africa, Asia, Latin America, and the Middle East (1987) with W. Ladd Hollist
- Mormons in Mexico: Dynamics of Faith and Culture (1987)
- Handbook of Research on the Illicit Drug Traffic: Socioeconomic and Political Consequences (1991)
- Unintended Consequences: Illegal Drugs and Drug Policies in Nine Countries (1995)
- Reflections at Skyefield (2006)
- Life without Marta: Letters to a Memory (2008)
- A Search for Place: Eight Generations of Henrys and the Settlement of Utah’s Uintah Basin (2010)
- Martyrs in Mexico: A Mormon Story of Revolution and Redemption (2018)

== Sources ==
- F. LaMond Tullis at the MLCA Database
- Mormons in Mexico dust jacket.
- Open Library listing
- catalogue NLA listing on Tullis
- short bio from Greenwood publishing
- Scientific Commons entry
- Treaster, Joseph B. (April 12, 1993). "CLINTON CONTINUES OLD DRUG POLICIES". The New York Times.
