= Brooksbank School =

The Brooksbank School
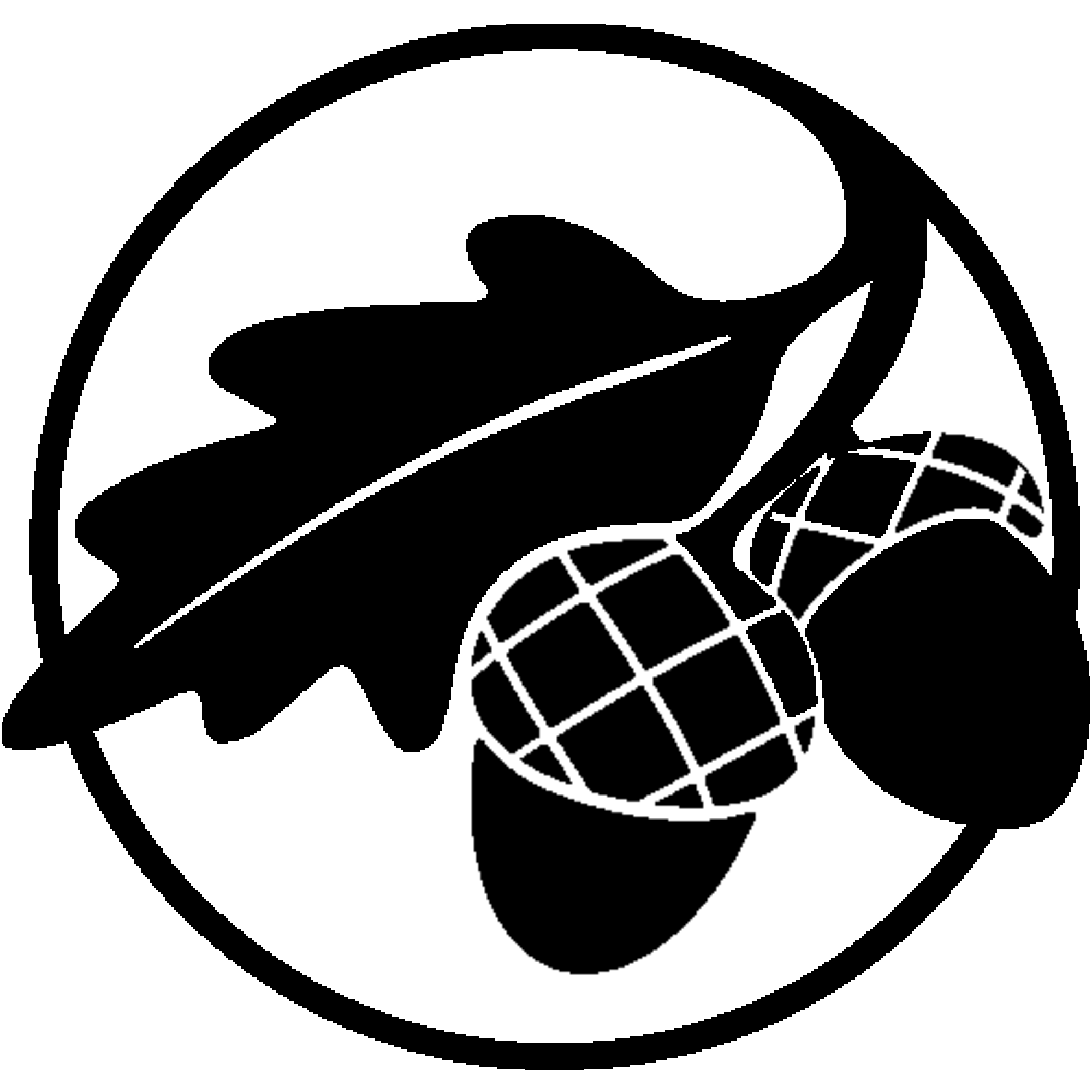
- School crest as of November 2022

Location
- Victoria Road; Elland, West Yorkshire, HX5 0QG; England
- 53.680963°N 1.850084°W

Information
- Type: Academy
- Motto: "Aspire and Achieve"
- Established: 1712
- Founder: Joseph Brooksbank
- Trust: Together Learning Trust
- Department for Education URN: 149531 Tables
- Ofsted: Reports
- Interim Headteacher: Dave Lord
- Age: 11 to 18
- Colours: Blue, gold
- Website: bbs.calderdale.sch.uk

The Brooksbank School is a secondary school with academy status in Elland, near Halifax in West Yorkshire, England. It is a sports college, as well as the second largest school in Calderdale, behind Trinity Academy, located in Sowerby Bridge. The school currently has over 1,700 pupils and over 250 members of staff.

== History ==
The school was founded in the town of Elland in Calderdale, West Yorkshire, by Joseph Brooksbank in 1712, to help forty impoverished children of Elland to learn to read without fees and to write for a charge of one penny a week. Brooksbank grew up in Elland but left the town at the age of sixteen to become a haberdasher’s apprentice in London. In 1679 he married Mary, daughter of merchant Richard Stamp and niece of the Thomas Stamp who became Lord Mayor in 1691. Brooksbank became a Citizen of the City of London in 1681 and was appointed a Master of the Haberdashers Company in 1718. Joseph Brookbanks's son, Stamp, born in 1694, became a director of the Bank of England by the age of thirty-six, appointed the governor of the bank from 1741-1743, and was a Member of Parliament. He was a millionaire at the time of his death in 1756. In the same year, Stamp’s son, also called Joseph, provided the school with a second endowment.

The school moved its premises to Westgate. Charity Commissioners, who inspected the school in 1829, reported that forty children were attending and that the schoolmaster was being paid a salary of £70 a year. A new school, the Elland and District Secondary School, was built on Victoria Road, opening on 12 September 1911 for approximately one hundred pupils. In 1933 this became Elland Grammar School. Twenty five years later the school became comprehensive, took the name 'Brooksbank' from its founder, and instituted a further building program. The Brooksbank School today has a teaching capacity for around 1,700 pupils.

== Campus ==
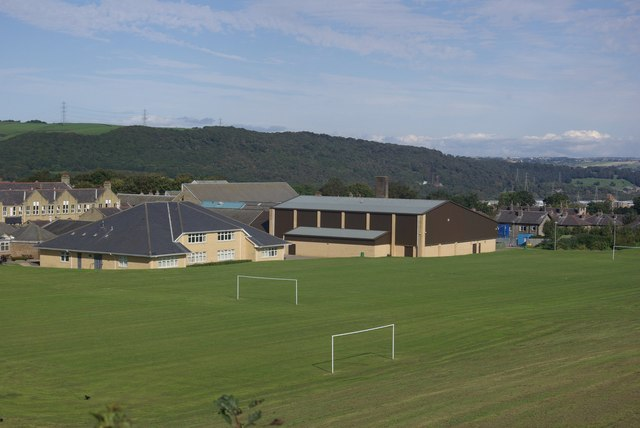
Classroom extensions and gym viewed from Blackley New Road

The school is on the west side of Elland, and is a five-minute walk from the town centre, and 0.5 miles (0.8 km) north-west from the accessible M62 motorway. Bus links include those to Halifax, Huddersfield and Brighouse. Facilities include a sports hall, four tennis courts, three drama studios, a playing field, a 3G Football pitch and a gymnasium. Brooksbank School sponsored sports include badminton, table tennis, and rugby.

== Extracurricular activities ==
Extracurricular activities include football and rugby, and the school also plays rugby league and competes in national school competitions. Since 2009, the school has been in the national championship final eight times, winning five of those appearances. Each year, the school performs a drama production and has over forty clubs and societies.

== Notable former students ==
- Imogen Allison, netball player
- Ewan Horrocks, actor
- Morgan Smithies, rugby league footballer
- Jack Senior, Footballer

== Notable former teachers ==
- Phil Senior, footballer
