= Harry Gilby =

English actor (born 2001)

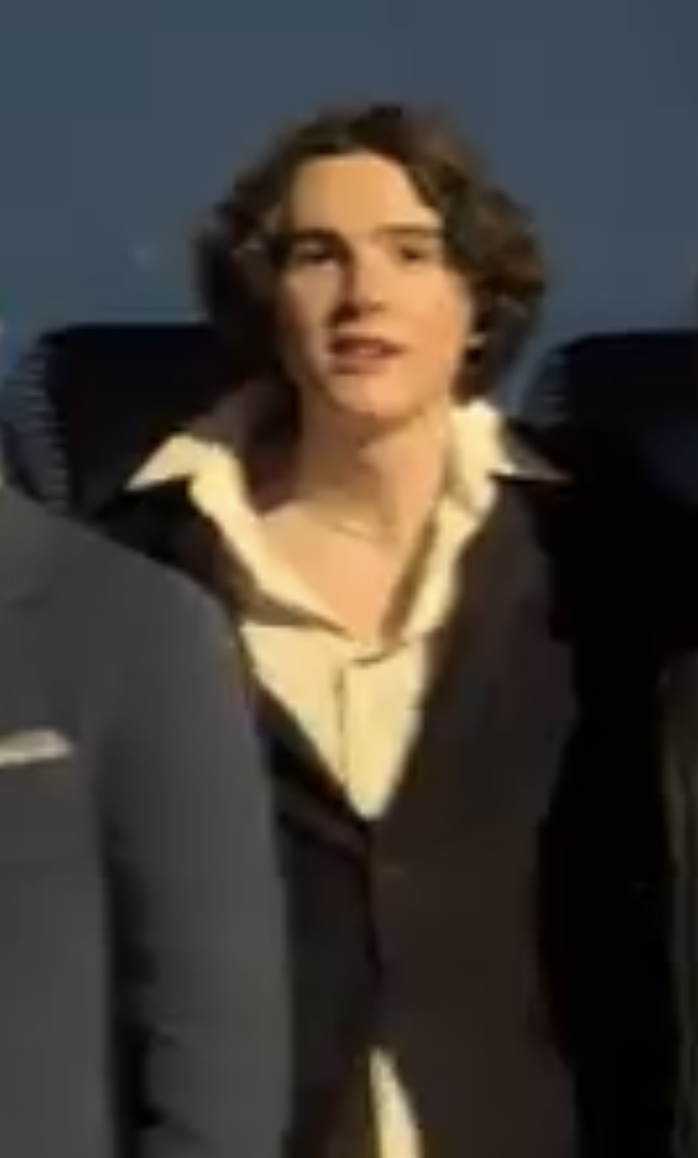
- Gilby in 2023
- Born: Harry John Gilby; 21 August 2001 (age 25); Nottingham, England
- Occupation: Actor
- Years active: 2016–present

Harry John Gilby (born 21 August 2001) is an English actor, best known for playing a young J. R. R. Tolkien in the film Tolkien (2019) and Æthelstan in the fifth season of The Last Kingdom (2022) and the follow-up film The Last Kingdom: Seven Kings Must Die (2023).

== Early life ==
Harry Gilby was born in Nottingham, England, in 2001 to parents Neil and Helen Gilby. He attended Sutton Bonington primary school before joining Trent College when he was 11. He began training at the Television Workshop in Nottingham when he was 12. Gilby played Nathan in the original cast of The Full Monty at the Noël Coward Theatre in London's West End.

== Career ==
Gilby made his television debut in 2016, when he played a village lad in an episode of Jericho. In 2017, he starred in the film Just Charlie, playing Charlie Lyndsay, a transgender girl with a special talent for playing football. He was nominated for Most Promising Newcomer at the British Independent Film Awards 2017 and Best Newcomer at the National Film Awards UK 2018 for his performance in Just Charlie. In 2018, he played Arlo in the short film Evie. In 2019, he played a young version of author J. R. R. Tolkien in Tolkien. He has also appeared in three episodes of Casualty as Toby Williams, a young boy dying of leukaemia. In 2020, the role of Robin Martin in an episode of British detective drama Granchester was played by Gilby.

In 2022, he played Æthelstan in the fifth series of The Last Kingdom. In 2023, he reprised the role in the follow-up feature-length sequel Seven Kings Must Die. In the same year, Gilby played the role of Eddie Holdgate in the short film ManMade, for which he won the Best Actor award at The Soho London Independent Film Festival. In 2024, Gilby played the role of Rupert in BBC Three show Boarders and returned in the second season of the show.

In 2025, Gilby played the role of Dan in the British romantic comedy My Fault: London, which is based on the Spanish book series Culpables by Mercedes Ron. Gilby is also expected to appear in the upcoming Amazon Prime Video series Malice.

== Filmography ==
=== Film ===
Year	Title	Role	Notes
2019	Tolkien	Young J.R.R. Tolkien	
2025	My Fault: London	Dan	

=== Television ===
Year	Title	Role	Notes
2016	Jericho	Village Lad	1 episode
2019	Casualty	Toby Williams	3 episodes
2020	Granchester	Robin Martin	1 episode
2022	The Last Kingdom	Æthelstan	Main role, 10 episodes
2023	The Last Kingdom: Seven Kings Must Die	Æthelstan	Television film
2024	Boarders	Rupert	Recurring role, 6 episodes
2025	Malice	Kit Tanner	Recurring role, 5 episodes
2026	Harry Potter	Charlie Weasley	Upcoming series
2027	The Cadburys	George	Upcoming series

== Awards and nominations ==
Year	Award	Category	Nominated work	Result	Ref.
2017	British Independent Film Awards	Most Promising Newcomer	Just Charlie	Nominated	
2018	National Film Awards UK	Best Newcomer	Just Charlie	Nominated	
