= The Boy Who Dared =

2008 novel by Susan Campbell Bartoletti

- Cover of The Boy Who Dared
- Author: Susan Campbell Bartoletti
- Cover artist: m
- Language: English
- Genre: Historical
- Publisher: Scholastic
- Publication date: 2008
- Publication place: United States
- Media type: Print (paperback)
- Pages: 192 pp
- ISBN: 0-439-68013-1
- OCLC: 123349649
- LC Class: PZ7.B2844 Boy 2008

The Boy Who Dared is a 2008 novel by American children's author Susan Campbell Bartoletti. It is based upon the true story of Helmuth Hübener, a 17 year old sentenced to death by the Nazis during World War II. He was arrested and executed by guillotine on October 27, 1942.

Bartoletti fleshed out one episode from her non-fiction Newbery Honor Book, Hitler Youth: Growing Up in Hitler's Shadow (2006), into this novel.

== Plot ==
The majority of the story is told through flashbacks, as Helmuth Hübener, charged with treason, waits in a Berlin prison for his execution. Starting with his memories as a young boy, Helmuth recounts his childhood growing up in Nazi Germany with his mother Mutti (German for "Mom"), grandparents, two brothers, his best friends Rudi and Karl, and his future stepfather Hugo, a Nazi soldier.

As a young boy, Helmuth plans to become a soldier and fight for Germany, but that changes when he grows up, and Helmuth stands out as a very knowledgeable young man. He becomes very opinionated about the Nazi government when he sees his Jewish classmate's father mercilessly murdered by the SA. Helmuth's brothers like Gerhard are separated as Gerhard goes to serve the country in marine work. He begins to secretly listen to forbidden enemy radio broadcasts and enlists the help of two of his closest friends in distributing anti-Nazi pamphlets. They are caught, and Helmuth is executed by guillotine in Berlin.

== Background ==
After Bartoletti finished her non-fiction Newbery Honor Book, Hitler Youth: Growing Up in Hitler's Shadow (2006), she wanted to expand on Helmuth Hübener's "amazing story" and "heroic actions" into another book. She chose fiction to explore deeper what his thoughts may have been and raise "questions about moral courage, nationalism, and the responsibility of the individual."

This story about Helmuth Hübener chronicles his years in school and his first job after graduation. Helmuth took an apprenticeship in the Bieberhaus, which is at the Social Welfare Department at City Hall. Although originally proud of the Fatherland and an enthusiastic participant in the Jungvolk, the Hitler Youth group, Helmuth became disillusioned as Nazi power and policies spread in Germany. Helmuth and a group of friends including Karl-Heinz Schnibbe, Rudolf Wobbe, and Gerhard Duwer, monitored banned radio broadcasts, in which the Allied Powers gave an accurate portrayal of the war in Europe rather than the version told through Axis propaganda. The friends printed pamphlets that were critical of Nazi Germany and distributed them to the public. Their activities were discovered by a co-worker of Helmuth's at the Bieberhaus and they were turned in to the Gestapo, where Helmuth was interrogated, beaten, and arrested for what was considered treason. Helmuth's friends received lighter sentences for their crimes. A brief show trial was held at the People's Court or Volksgerichtshof, and at age seventeen, Helmuth Hübener was executed at Plotzensee Prison in Berlin, becoming the youngest person in history executed for opposing the Third Reich.

== Contents ==
The book includes the author's note, pictures, a copy of the poster announcing Helmuth Hübener's execution, a 1936 map of Europe, and a Third Reich timeline, 1918–1945.

== Awards ==
- 2009 Notable Books for a Global Society
- 2008 Booklist: Editors' Choice: Books for Youth, Top 10 Historical Fiction for Youth
- Book Sense Children's Picks - Spring 2008
- 2009 ALA Best Book for Young Adults
- NCSS Notable Social Studies Trade Books for Young People 2009, World History and Culture
