= Ewan Horrocks =

English actor

- Born: Halifax, West Yorkshire, England
- Education: Manchester School of Acting
- Occupation: Actor
- Years active: 2021–present

Ewan Horrocks is an English actor. On television, he appeared in the Sky Atlantic series Domina (2021–2023), the Netflix series The Last Kingdom (2022) and the Channel 4 series A Woman of Substance (2026). He starred in the film Truth & Treason (2025).

== Early life ==
He was born and raised in Halifax, Yorkshire. He has one sister. Horrocks attended the Brooksbank School. He worked as a lifeguard in a local swimming pool prior to acting. At age 16, he joined the National Youth Theatre. He went on to study at the Manchester School of Acting.

== Career ==
Horrocks had his first television role playing young Drusus, the son of Livia Drusilla, in Roman historical Domina in 2021.

In 2022, Horrocks played Ælfweard, the son of Edward the Elder. He reprised the role in the 2023 film The Last Kingdom: Seven Kings Must Die.

In 2023, he was cast in The Yellow Tie alongside John Malkovich, playing a young Sergiu Celibidache, and the 20th-century European historical drama Miss Fallaci. In April 2025, he was reported to be joining Brenda Blethyn and Emmett J. Scanlan in a Channel 4 reboot of the Barbara Taylor Bradford bestselling novel, A Woman of Substance.

== Personal life ==
He is no relation to actress Jane Horrocks.

== Filmography ==
Key
†	Denotes works that have not yet been released

=== Film ===
Year	Title	Role	Notes
2025	Truth & Treason	Helmuth Hübener	
TBA	The Yellow Tie†	Young Sergiu	Post-production

=== Television ===
Year	Title	Role	Notes
2021–2023	Domina	Young Drusus	14 episodes
2022	The Last Kingdom	Ælfweard	9 episodes
2023	The Last Kingdom: Seven Kings Must Die	Ælfweard	TV film
2024	Miss Fallaci	Richard Price	1 episode
2025	Lazarus	Young Lazarus	6 episodes
2026	A Woman of Substance	Edwin Fairley	8 episodes
