= Douglas F. Tobler =

American Latter Day Saint writer (born c. 1936)

Douglas F. Tobler (born c. 1936) is an emeritus professor of German and Holocaust history at Brigham Young University (BYU).

== Biography ==
Tobler is a native of Cedar City, Utah. He served as a missionary in the Swiss-Austrian Mission of the Church of Jesus Christ of Latter-day Saints (LDS Church). He has bachelor's and master's degrees from BYU and a Ph.D. from the University of Kansas. Tobler and his wife, the former Carol Noble, are the parents of four children. Among other callings in the LDS Church, Tobler has served as a bishop.

While on the BYU faculty Tobler also served for a time as associate dean of general education and honors.

Tobler served from 1998-2001 as president of the Poland Warsaw Mission of the LDS Church.

== Writings ==
Among works by Tobler are Mormonism: A Faith for All Cultures (co-edited with F. LaMond Tullis, Arthur Henry King and Spencer J. Palmer), and History of The Mormons in Photographs and Texts. Tobler also translated and edited with Alan F. Keele, Karl-Heinz Schnibbe's The Price: A True Story of a Mormon Who Defied Hitler. Tobler was also the editor of the Remembrance, Repentance and Reconciliation a collection made in 1998 of articles about the Churches and the Holocaust. Tobler has also written articles on LDS German, Russian, and Holocaust history for BYU Studies. He also wrote a book chapter in which he considered how European rejection of human rights brought upon them the horrors of World War II and how things have been better since that war. Tobler wrote an article for the Ensign about the Latter-day Saints in 19th-century Britain. Tobler has also written on the Swiss in Utah in a way that shows his broad understanding of both Utah history and Swiss intellectual history.
