= Cordula Ditz =

German artist and musician

Cordula Ditz (born 1972 in Hamburg, Germany) is a German artist and musician, who works with painting, installation, video, collage and performance. She lives and works in Hamburg, Germany.

== Work ==
In her work, Ditz puts installation, sculpture, painting, performance, sound and video on an equal footing within a common frame of reference. In her collage-like installations she explores how cultural constructions emphasize masculine power and exclude and silence women and other marginalized groups. Ditz's work scrutinizes the ways in which ideas about gender roles and identity are constructed, reiterated, and solidified—the media play a salient role in this process—and how they inform conscious as well as unconscious minds. To this purpose, she gathers materials she finds online and in books, magazines, and films and integrates them into paintings and videos in the form of collages or montages. The result is imagery that is open about its genesis and performative nature in order to prompt reaction on media representation and the production of normative codifications.

Aspects of oppression, impuissance, and loss of control in various forms associated with the stereotype of the helpless woman appear side by side with historic examples of resistance. Depictions of ghostly apparitions point to Spiritualism as practiced in nineteenth-century America, where being cast in the role of the medium capable of communication with spirits helped women raise their voices and publicly address issues of contemporary social and political relevance for the first time. Her artist's book 'I don't need a cloak to become invisible' was published by Spector Books, New York in 2022.

== Exhibitions ==
She exhibited national and international. She also received numerous acknowledgments including: The 'Zeit Stipendium' by German newspaper Die Zeit (2020) and 'German Study Centre in Venice' awarded by the German government (2017). Since 2022, the Hamburger Kunsthalle has been exhibiting her installation "You May Not Know Him, But" about Helmuth Hübener.

=== Solo exhibitions ===
- 2016 Kiss Tomorrow Goodbye, Galerie Conradi, Hamburg
- 2017 Don't Breathe, Cave Gallery, Detroit, USA
- 2017 I'm Becoming A Ghost, Galerie Conradi, Bruxelles, Belgium
- 2018 How to Disappear, Galerie Conradi, Hamburg
- 2019 Your Silence Is Very Disturbing, Galerie im Marstall, Ahrensburg
- 2020 You may not know him but, MIND the GAP, Bieberhaus, Hamburg
- 2022 I don't need a cloak to become invisible, Conradi, Hamburg
- 2022 The weak lips of a woman, Kunstverein Harburger Bahnhof, Hamburg
- 2024 They Speak to Us in Dreams, Kunsthaus Hamburg, Hamburg

=== Group exhibitions ===
- 2011 Dirty Dancing, Figge von Rosen, Cologne
- 2012 The Digital Uncanny, Edith Russ Haus für Medienkunst, Oldenburg
- 2015 Spectral Presences, Art Cinema OffOff, Filmfest Gent, Belgium
- 2019 Sanctum, Big Medium, Austin, USA
- 2020 HUMOR NACH #METOO - BEING LAID UP WAS NO EXCUSE FOR NOT MAKING ART, Kunstverein in Hamburg,
- 2021 So wie wir sind 3.0, Weserburg Museum für moderne Kunst, Bremen
- 2021 L’Invitation au voyage, Esther Schipper, Berlin
- 2022 Femme Fatale, Kunsthalle Hamburg
- 2022 SOMETHING NEW, SOMETHING OLD, SOMETHING DESIRED, Kunsthalle Hamburg
