= Prime Target (TV series) =

2025 TV series

- Promotional poster
- Genre: Thriller
- Created by: Steve Thompson
- Directed by: Brady Hood
- Starring: Leo Woodall; Quintessa Swindell; Sidse Babett Knudsen; David Morrissey; Stephen Rea; Fra Fee; Joseph Mydell; Jason Flemyng; Martha Plimpton
- Composer: Arthur Sharpe
- Countries of origin: United Kingdom; United States
- Original language: English
- No. of seasons: 1
- No. of episodes: 8

Production
- Executive producers: Arnon Milchan; Yariv Milchan; Michael Schaefer; Ridley Scott; David W. Zucker; Emma Broughton; Beth Pattinson; Laura Hastings-Smith; Brady Hood; Steve Thompson; Marina Brackenbury; Ed Rubin
- Producers: Sarah Jane Wheale; Laura Hastings-Smith
- Cinematography: Dan Atherton
- Editor: Beverley Mills
- Production companies: New Regency; Scott Free Productions

Original release
- Network: Apple TV+
- Release: 22 January – 5 March 2025

Prime Target is a thriller television series created by Steve Thompson and starring Leo Woodall as a mathematician. It premiered on Apple TV+ on 22 January 2025 and received mixed reviews from critics.

== Synopsis ==
Edward Brooks is a doctoral student at the University of Cambridge. The subject of his dissertation is an analysis of patterns in the sequence of prime numbers. His academic supervisor, Robert Mallinder, is being monitored by NSA agents, including Taylah Sanders, who keep watch on anyone who might make advances in this field given its importance to cryptography. When Mallinder realises the subject of Brooks' work, he warns him off the project and destroys his student's research. Shortly afterwards Mallinder appears to kill himself. Around about the same time, Sanders' colleague is assassinated and she flees to find Brooks. They travel to Baghdad to continue his research in a newly discovered historical site that may contain information from early Islamic mathematicians. Sanders finds that her supervisor has approved Brooks' assassination. Eventually Brooks is detained by the NSA and is able to develop a prime finder that will aid codebreaking.

Brooks realizes that Professor James Alderman has been the one ruthlessly pursuing the prime finder and will keep ordering killings in order to find it. Brooks kills him and goes on the run while Sanders is apprehended by the police.

== Cast ==
=== Main ===
- Leo Woodall as Edward Brooks, a mathematics student at Cambridge University
- Quintessa Swindell as Taylah Sanders, an NSA agent remotely spying on various academics
- Sidse Babett Knudsen as Professor Andrea Lavin, Robert Mallinder's wife, an archaeologist and professor at Cambridge
- David Morrissey as Professor Robert Mallinder, a mathematics professor who died under suspicious circumstances
- Stephen Rea as Professor James Alderman
- Fra Fee as Adam Mellor
- Joseph Mydell as Professor Raymond Osborne
- Jason Flemyng as Stephen Patrick Nield
- Martha Plimpton as Jane Torres
- Harry Lloyd as Andrew Carter
- Ali Suliman as Dr. Akram Nizar

=== Recurring ===
- Maanuv Thiara as Dr. Charan Nathoo
- Sergej Onopko as Bogdan Vlahovic

=== Guest ===
- Daisy Waterstone as Fiona Carey
- Tim Faraday as Keith Wyatt
- Rod Hallett as Brian Brooks
- Tom Stourton as Ricky Olson
- Sofia Barclay as Safiya Zamil
- Tom Byrne as Tom Grayson

== Episodes ==
No.	Title	Directed by	Written by	Original release date
1	"A New Pattern"	Brady Hood	Steve Thompson	22 January 2025
2	"Syracuse"	Brady Hood	Steve Thompson	22 January 2025
3	"The Sequence"	Brady Hood	Steve Thompson	29 January 2025
4	"Kaplar"	Brady Hood	Steve Thompson	5 February 2025
5	"House of Wisdom"	Brady Hood	Steve Thompson	12 February 2025
6	"The Last Link"	Brady Hood	Thomas Martin	19 February 2025
7	"Prime Finder"	Brady Hood	Selina Lim & Steve Thompson	26 February 2025
8	"The Key"	Brady Hood	Steve Thompson	5 March 2025

== Production ==
It was announced in February 2024 that Apple TV+ had greenlit the series, created by Steve Thompson. Principal photography took place in Windsor in May 2023, with other filming locations reported to include London. Filming took place in Cambridge in August 2023. Photography took place in Morocco, Paris, and Kent.

== Release ==
Prime Target was released on Apple TV+ on 22 January 2025, with the first two episodes available immediately and followed by one episode on a weekly basis until the eighth episode on 5 March.

== Reception ==
The review aggregator website Rotten Tomatoes reported a 43% approval rating with an average rating of 5.1/10, based on 46 critic reviews. The website's critics consensus reads, "(Goofy concept + likable ensemble) ÷ sludgy pacing = an attractive but mediocre globetrotting series." Metacritic, which uses a weighted average, assigned a score of 56 out of 100 based on 21 critics, indicating "mixed or average" reviews.
