= The Last Kingdom: Seven Kings Must Die =

British television film

- Official release poster
- Directed by: Edward Bazalgette
- Written by: Martha Hillier
- Based on: The Saxon Stories by Bernard Cornwell
- Produced by: Nigel Marchant; Gareth Neame; Mat Chaplin
- Starring: Alexander Dreymon; Harry Gilby; Mark Rowley; Arnas Fedaravicius; Cavan Clerkin; James Northcote; Laurie Davidson; Elaine Cassidy; Ross Anderson; Ilona Chevakova; Jacob Dudman; Rod Hallett; Ewan Horrocks; Steffan Rhodri
- Cinematography: Luke Bryant
- Edited by: Adam Green
- Production company: Carnival Films
- Distributed by: Netflix
- Release date: 14 April 2023
- Running time: 111 minutes
- Country: United Kingdom
- Language: English

The Last Kingdom: Seven Kings Must Die is a 2023 British historical drama film directed by Edward Bazalgette, written by Martha Hillier and based on The Saxon Stories series of novels by Bernard Cornwell. It is the sequel and conclusion to the television series The Last Kingdom. The series regulars Alexander Dreymon, Harry Gilby, Mark Rowley, Arnas Fedaravicius, Cavan Clerkin, James Northcote, Ross Anderson, Ilona Chevakova, Rod Hallett, Ewan Horrocks and Steffan Rhodri reprise their roles. It was released on 14 April 2023 on Netflix.

== Plot ==
Anlaf, a Viking king from Ireland, arrives with his army in Northumbria after learning that Edward, King of the Anglo-Saxons, has fallen gravely ill. Edward soon dies, leaving behind three sons, none of whom were named as his aetheling. Lady Eadgifu and her son Edmund, the youngest of the three, flee to Bebbanburg, where Edward's former ally Uhtred resides. Although retired from war, Uhtred is informed that Edward's eldest son Aethelstan will likely attack his younger brother Aelfweard and makes plans to stop him. Before Uhtred leaves, Ingrith prophesies that "seven kings must die" before England is to be united.

Uhtred reaches Aegelesburg, where Aelfweard prepares for Aethelstan's impending attack. Aethelstan and his adviser Ingimundr soon arrive and thwart a trap set by Aelfweard. Uhtred convinces Aelfweard to surrender peacefully, but Aethelstan swiftly kills Aelfweard and massacres his men. Aethelstan is crowned King of the Saxons and Ingilmundr, who is secretly Aethelstan's lover, urges him to fulfil his grandfather's dream of uniting England and all Christians. Aethelstan is convinced that this unification will, in the eyes of God, compensate for his homosexuality, which he considers a great sin.

In Eoferwic, Aethelstan has taken over following the death of the Northumbrian king Rǫgnvaldr and demands that all foreign kings pay him tribute or face conquest and forced baptism. Uhtred arrives and witnesses the destruction of pagan monuments, then learns that King Hywel Dda has submitted to Aethelstan after his son was taken hostage. Uhtred then discovers Aethelstan's relationship with Ingilmundr and believes he is being deceived. Ingilmundr secretly plans to have Uhtred killed, but Aldhelm warns Uhtred, who flees back to Bebbanburg. Aldhelm is subsequently labelled a traitor by Aethelstan and hanged for his actions. Ingilmundr arrives at Bebbanburg to take the castle, but unaware that Uhtred had escaped, is quickly captured. Ingilmundr later convinces a servant to lure Uhtred into a trap, where he is captured by Aethelstan's men, forcing Osbert to surrender Bebbanburg. Osbert and Edmund are taken captive and sent to Thelwael, while Aethelstan, unable to kill Uhtred, banishes him from England.

On the Isle of Man, Anlaf hosts a gathering of kings with Prince Domnal and the rulers of Strathclyde, Orkney, Shetland, and Man, warning them of Aethelstan's impending conquest. Although they initially decline the offer of allying with a pagan, Aethelstan embarks upon an invasion of Scotland, forcing King Constantin and the other rulers to form an alliance. A weakened Uhtred is found by the Danes and taken to Shetland, where he learns that Ingilmundr is a Danish spy. He meets with Anlaf and the other kings, who ask Uhtred to assassinate Aethelstan to avoid war.

Uhtred travels to Wintanceaster and fails to convince Aethelstan to stop his aggression. Uhtred then returns to Bebbanburg, only to learn from Eadgifu that Anlaf had sacked the castle and sealed Ingrith and the commonfolk in a cave to suffocate. Ingilmundr massacres the Saxons at Thelwael, and Uhtred later arrives to discover that Osbert and Edmund had managed to stay hidden and survive. A remorseful Aethelstan makes peace with Uhtred and plans to stop Anlaf's invasion, but refuses any help. Knowing that Aethelstan will likely die, Uhtred and his allies head to face Anlaf, who has amassed his forces at Brunanburh. At the Battle of Brunanburh, Uhtred and Aethelstan's forces are heavily outnumbered and make a tactical withdrawal, allowing Saxon cavalry to flank from behind, targeting the enemy kings and their heirs. In the fighting, Domnal and the heirs are killed, causing a general withdrawal that turns into a rout. After witnessing Ingilmundr attack Aethelstan, Uhtred is gravely wounded whilst attempting to aid him.

In the aftermath of the battle, the other kings quickly abandon Anlaf, and a captive Ingilmundr is executed. Aethelstan helps to return the gravely wounded Uhtred to Bebbanburg, and Finan concludes that the deaths of Edward and the five heirs—five kings who will never be crowned—only partially fulfil the prophecy that "seven kings must die", while Uhtred speculates that he will be the seventh. Uhtred agrees to swear Northumbria to Aethelstan in exchange for him agreeing to make Edmund his sole heir, making Aethelstan the first king of a united England, fulfilling the dream of his grandfather King Alfred the Great. Seemingly on the verge of death, Uhtred experiences a vision of Valhalla, where he sees several of his deceased allies waiting for him.

== Cast ==
- Alexander Dreymon as Uhtred of Bebbanburg, a seasoned Saxon warrior who was raised by the Danes and successfully reclaimed his birthright as the Lord of Bebbanburg. A veteran of countless battles, he once swore oaths to serve Kings Alfred and Edward and is viewed by many as the unofficial king of England's last independent kingdom, Northumbria.
- Harry Gilby as Aethelstan, the eldest son of King Edward born from his secret first marriage. Fearing for his son's life due to his illegitimacy, Edward once placed Aethelstan under Uhtred's protection, who trained him to become a warrior.
- Mark Rowley as Finan, an Irish warrior sworn to Uhtred and his second-in-command who has fought alongside him in many battles.
- Arnas Fedaravicius as Sihtric, a Danish warrior and bastard son of a Viking warlord who became one of Uhtred's most trusted allies.
- Cavan Clerkin as Father Pyrlig, a Welsh priest and retired warrior who is sworn to serve the ruler of Wessex.
- James Northcote as Aldhelm, Aethelstan's Mercian Huscarl who previously served his aunt for many years.
- Laurie Davidson as Ingilmundr, Aethelstan's devout advisor and secret lover who heavily influences his decisions.
- Elaine Cassidy as Lady Eadgifu, the third wife of King Edward and mother of his youngest son, Edmund.
- Ross Anderson as Domnal, the Prince of Alba, nephew of King Constantin and heir to the Scottish throne.
- Ilona Chevakova as Ingrith, Finan's wife who experiences a prophetic vision that "seven kings must die" to unite England.
- Jacob Dudman as Osbert, Uhtred's youngest son and heir who was reunited with his father after spending much of his childhood in hiding.
- Rod Hallett as Constantin, the King of Alba who previously signed a peace treaty with King Edward to protect Scottish lands.
- Ewan Horrocks as Aelfweard, the second eldest son of King Edward, born from his second marriage, who is backed by the Wessex Ealdormen to become the future king.
- Steffan Rhodri as Hywel Dda, the King of Deheubarth who previously aided King Edward in defeating a large army of invading Danes.
- Pekka Strang as Anlaf, the Viking King of Dublin who travels to England to take advantage of King Edward's ailing health.
- Ingrid García-Jonsson as Brand, a Danish Wolf-Warrior loyal to Anlaf.
- Agnes Born as Astrid, Anlaf's daughter who spies on the Saxons for him.
- Zak Sutcliffe as Edmund, the youngest son of King Edward, born from his third marriage with Eadgifu.
- Steph Bramwell as Lady Wassa, a servant at Bebbanburg.
- Tom Christian as Dunstan, a mercenary in Aegelesburg.
- John Buick as Owain, the King of Strathclyde.
- Nick Wittman as Eamon, a Saxon officer in Aethelstan's army.

Zoltan Andrasi portrays a Saxon lookout and Juhász Vince and Dániel Brezovszky portray a pair of teenage mercenaries. Zsolt Pall, Attila Árpa and Laurent Winkler portray the kings of Orkney, Shetland and Man respectively while Balogh Domokos, Kolos András Takács, Dániel Hernádi and Gábor Turtsányi portray the sons of the kings of Strathclyde, Orkney, Shetland and Man. Several actors also reprise their roles from The Last Kingdom as they feast together in Valhalla: Emily Cox as Brida, Uhtred's childhood friend-turned-adversary; Jeppe Beck Laursen as Haesten, a Danish warlord previously at odds with the Kings of Wessex and Mercia; Magnus Samuelsson as Clapa, a fearless warrior who once served Uhtred; and Peter Gantzler as Earl Ragnar; Uhtred's foster father and a Danish warlord.

== Production ==
The producer Nigel Marchant revealed that talks about a film had been proceeding following the launch of The Last Kingdom's fourth series in April 2020. In October 2021, prior to the fifth series of The Last Kingdom being released on Netflix in early 2022, the feature-length sequel to the series was announced at the MCM London Comic Con by Dreymon, who acted as executive producer as well as starring as Uhtred. It was given the working title Seven Kings Must Die and would follow events of the series which took place over a circa-45-year period of history from 866 onwards focusing on the Kingdom of Wessex and ongoing Viking incursions into England.

The screenplay for Seven Kings Must Die was written by Martha Hillier with direction by Ed Bazalgette and production by Marchant, Gareth Neame and Mat Chaplin. Alongside Dreymon, Hillier also served as executive producer. It was produced by Carnival Films and distributed worldwide by NBCUniversal International Distribution. Principal photography began in Budapest in January 2022, and wrapped by the end of March 2022.

Several characters portrayed by series regulars on The Last Kingdom were cut from the film during production which included Lady Aelswith (Eliza Butterworth), King Edward (Timothy Innes), Lady Aelfwynn (Phia Saban), Cynlaef (Ryan Quarmby) and Uhtred's elder children Stiorra (Ruby Hartley) and Young Uhtred (Finn Elliot) due to the condensed running time from the change in format. The screenwriter Martha Hillier stated that "It was heartbreaking..." she began. "But we only really had a certain amount of real estate and we couldn't service all the characters. It's a much more single protagonist story".

== Release ==
The film was released on 14 April 2023 on Netflix.

== Reception ==
=== Audience viewership ===
Globally, The Last Kingdom: Seven Kings Must Die debuted at number one on Netflix's Top 10 Film English titles for the tracking week of 10–16 April 2023 with 35.5 million hours viewed. On the following week, it remained at number one and garnered 25.7 million viewing hours.

In the United Kingdom the film debuted at number two for the first tracking week, and moved down one spot to number three on the following week. In the United States, according to Whip Media's TV Time, it was the most streamed film across all platforms during the week of 16 April 2023.

=== Critical response ===
On the review aggregator website Rotten Tomatoes, the film holds an approval rating of 82%, based on 17 critic reviews with an average rating of 7.1/10. Metacritic, which uses a weighted average, assigned a score of 48 out of 100, based on 6 reviews indicating "mixed or average reviews".

Leslie Felperin in The Guardian said that the film has "a ton of plot crammed tightly into the running time", but that the director "Edward Bazalgette manages the storytelling efficiently". Jo Berry in Digital Spy described a "beautifully filmed action adventure with a watchable lead in Alexander Dreymon". Catharine Bray for Variety praised Pekka Strang in his role of the Danish warrior King Anlaf whilst saying it is "probably not a film that will engage too many people outside the show's existing fanbase" but that it "is most interesting, however, is in its approach to religion, sexuality and culture" and the blending of peoples, beliefs and values similar to the modern day.
