= Giovanni Battista Falcieri =

19th century Greek servant to nobility

Giovanni Battista Falcieri (known as “Tita”) (1798–1874) was the personal servant of Lord Byron and was present at his death in Missolonghi in 1824. He later accompanied Benjamin Disraeli on his tour of the Orient, before becoming the valet of Isaac D'Israeli.

== Employment by Lord Byron ==
Tita was a gondolier and it was in that capacity that he first entered Lord Byron's service in 1818 during Byron's sojourn in Venice. He later became Byron's personal attendant and appears frequently in the correspondence of Byron's friends and acquaintances.

== Death of Lord Byron ==
According to Count Gamba's account of Byron's death:

At four o’clock, after this consultation of his physicians, he seemed to be aware of his approaching end. I think this was the exact time, and not before. Dr. Millingen, Fletcher, and Tita were round his bed. The two first could not contain their tears, and walked out of the room. Tita also wept, but he could not retire, as Byron had hold of his hand; but he turned away his face. Byron looked at him steadily, and said, half smiling, in Italian—Oh questa è una bella scena.

Falcieri accompanied Lord Byron's body to England.

== Subsequent career ==
Following Byron's funeral Tita remained in England and served as valet to Byron's friend John Cam Hobhouse, before returning to Greece to fight in the Greek War of Independence in 1825. In 1828 he returned to England and served as valet to James Clay on his Grand Tour 1829/30.

Falcieri subsequently joined Benjamin Disraeli on his tour of the Orient in 1830/31 and was then employed as valet to Isaac D’Israeli at Bradenham Manor in Buckinghamshire between 1832 and 1848. On Isaac D’Israeli's death, Hobhouse arranged for him to be employed as a Government messenger. He numbered among his acquaintance the Count D’Orsay, who presented him with a valuable emerald ring in gratitude for his assistance in relation to a posthumous portrait of Byron.

== Posterity ==
After Falcieri's death, Disraeli recommended Tita's widow to Queen Victoria for a pension from the Civil list, though she did not enjoy it for long, dying in 1877.

A portrait of Falcieri by Daniel Maclise forms part of the National Trust’s collection at Hughenden Manor.
