= Rod Hallett =

English actor

- Born: Rod Hallett; England
- Occupation: Actor
- Years active: 2001–present

Rod Hallett is an English television, film, and stage actor best known for his roles in The Tudors (2008–2010), Terra Nova (2011), Crisis (2014), The Last Kingdom (2022), and Outlander (2023).

== Career ==
From 2008 to 2010, Hallett portrayed Richard Rich, 1st Baron Rich in the historical drama The Tudors. In 2011, Hallett joined the cast of American science fiction drama television series Terra Nova in the role of Dr. Malcolm Wallace. Hallett appeared in the 2015 MCU American superhero film Ant-Man, and in 2017, he appeared in the American action comedy film The Hitman's Bodyguard.

In 2022, Hallett portrayed King Constantine II of Scotland in season 5 of the Netflix historical drama The Last Kingdom. The following year, he reprised his role as King Constantine II in the film The Last Kingdom: Seven Kings Must Die, in which a fictionalised version of the events of the Battle of Brunanburh are portrayed. In 2023, Hallett was cast as Major General Benedict Arnold in season 7 of the historical drama Outlander, where he portrayed Arnold's exploits during the Battles of Saratoga during the American Revolutionary War. In 2024, Hallett played PC Harry Sinclair in the BBC medical drama Casualty.

== Personal life ==
Hallett is currently based in London.

== Filmography ==
=== Film ===
Year	Title	Role	Notes
2007	The Shadow Within	Monsieur Prevost	
2013	Mindscape	Detective Worner	
2015	Ant-Man	Hydra Buyer	
2017	The Hitman's Bodyguard	Professor Asimov	
2022	5000 Blankets	Pastor Stevens	
2023	The Last Kingdom: Seven Kings Must Die	King Constantine II of Scotland	

=== Television ===
Year	Title	Role	Notes
2001	Home and Away	James Cooper	2 episodes
2002	Spooks	Andrew Dorland (uncredited)	Episode: "Looking After Our Own"
2002	Doctors	DC Patrick Ayers	8 episodes
2002, 2008	Holby City	Paul / Lucas Michaels	3 episodes
2004	EastEnders	Ollie	2 episodes
2004, 2007	The Bill	Toby Cook / Vincent Hammond	2 episodes
2005	Ultimate Force	Toby	Episode: "Deadlier Than the Male"
2005	Judge John Deed	DI Andy Wyman	Episode: "Above the Law"
2005	Midsomer Murders	Dexter Lockwood	Episode: "Sauce for the Goose"
2006	Perfect Disasters	Deputy Mayor's Assistant	Episode: "Mega Flood"
2006	Ancient Rome: The Rise and Fall of an Empire	Nicanor	Episode: "Rebellion"
2007	Gina's Laughing Gear	Colonel	Episode: "Dollby City"
2008–2010	The Tudors	Richard Rich, 1st Baron Rich	19 episodes
2009	Magic Grandad	Charles Darwin	Episode: "Charles Darwin"
2010	The Silence	DCI Peter MacKinnon	4 episodes
2011	Terra Nova	Dr. Malcolm Wallace	11 episodes
2013	Father Brown	Father Franc, Wilhelm	Episode: "The Man in the Tree"
2013	Ripper Street	Joshua Fields	Episode: "A Man of My Company"
2014	Crisis	Jonas Clarenbach	9 episodes
2014	Perception	Graham Perri	Episode: "Bolero"
2015	Silent Witness	Robert Mansfield	2 episodes
2015	No Offence	Pushkin	Episode #1.7
2015	The Bastard Executioner	Guy de Beauchamp	2 episodes
2015	Legends	Young Terrance Graves	4 episodes
2017	Genius	Dr. Carl Jung	Episode: "Einstein: Chapter Five"
2018	MacGyver	Dr. Poppa	Episode: "Specimen 234 + PAPR + Outbreak"
2022	The Last Kingdom	King Constantine II of Scotland	5 episodes
2022	Red Rose	Simon	4 episodes
2023	Outlander	Major General Benedict Arnold	5 episodes
2024	Casualty	PC Harry Sinclair	8 episodes
2024	Prime Target	Brian Brooks	Post-production
