= Susan Campbell Bartoletti =

American writer of children's literature

- Born: November 18, 1958 (age 67); Harrisburg, Pennsylvania, U.S.
- Education: Marywood College; University of Scranton
- Occupations: Artist; children's author; educator
- Website: www.scbartoletti.com

Susan Campbell Bartoletti (born November 18, 1958) is an American writer of children's literature whose work includes Kids on Strike! and Hitler Youth: Growing Up in Hitler's Shadow.

She was born in Harrisburg, Pennsylvania, but eventually the family ended up in a small town in northeastern Pennsylvania. She graduated from Marywood University (previously College) in 1979 and from the University of Scranton in 1982.

Campbell Bartoletti began her career as an eighth-grade English teacher before deciding to pursue writing in earnest. Seeing her students write and create original work, she was inspired to create her own. In connection with her students, Susan said that "I felt immense satisfaction in watching my students grow as writers. I wanted to practice what I preached, so I joined a writers group and got serious about my own writing." She sold her first short story in 1989. Three years later, in 1992, Campbell Bartoletti published her first picture book, Silver at Night. She held a rigid routine, waking early in the morning in order to write before she left to teach. In 1997, she turned to writing full-time. Since then, her works have received a number of awards, including the NCTE Orbis Pictus Award for Nonfiction, the SCBWI Golden Kite Award for Nonfiction, the Jane Addams Children's Book Award, and the Newbery Honor in 2006.

She teaches writing classes at a number of MA and MFA programs, among them Spalding University in Louisville, Kentucky, and Hollins University in Roanoke, Virginia. Additionally, she leads workshops offered through the Highlights Foundation. She resides with her family in Moscow, Pennsylvania.

== Works ==
=== Non-fiction ===
- Growing Up in Coal Country (1996)
- Kids on Strike! (1999)
- Black Potatoes: The Story of the Great Irish Famine, 1845 to 1850 (2001) - 2002 Robert F. Sibert Informational Book Medal Winner
- The Flag Maker (2004)
- Hitler Youth: Growing Up in Hitler's Shadow (2005) – 2006 Newbery Honor Book
- They Called Themselves The K.K.K.: The Birth of an American Terrorist Group (2010)

=== Fiction ===
- Silver at Night (1994)
- Dancing with Dziadziu (1997)
- No Man's Land: A Young Soldier's Story (1999)
- A Coal Miner's Bride: The Diary of Anetka Kaminska (2000), Dear America Series
- The Christmas Promise (2001), Blue Sky Press
- The Journal of Finn Reardon: A Newsie (2003), My Name is America Series
- Nobody's Nosier Than a Cat (2003)
- Nobody's Diggier than a Dog (2005)
- The Boy Who Dared (2008)
- Naamah and the Ark at Night (2011)
