= Truth & Treason =

- Theatrical release poster
- Directed by: Matt Whitaker
- Written by: Ethan Vincent; Matt Whitaker
- Produced by: John Foss; Russ Kendall; Matt Whitaker
- Starring: Ewan Horrocks; Ferdinand McKay; Daf Thomas; Nye Occomore; Rupert Evans
- Cinematography: Bianca Cline
- Edited by: Adam L. Banks
- Music by: Aaron Zigman
- Production company: Kaleidoscope Pictures
- Distributed by: Angel
- Release date: October 17, 2025
- Running time: 121 minutes
- Country: United States
- Language: English
- Box office: $6.2 million

Truth & Treason is a 2025 American drama film based on the true story of Helmuth Hübener, a teenage resistance fighter who opposed the Nazi regime in Germany during WWII. The film was previously titled Truth & Conviction.

The project is directed by Matt Whitaker, who also wrote the film alongside Ethan Vincent. It is produced by Russ Kendall, John Foss, and Matt Whitaker, with Adam Thomas Anderegg and Micah W. Merrill as executive producers.

The film was released in the United States on October 17, 2025.

== Cast ==
- Ewan Horrocks: Helmuth Hübener
- Rupert Evans: Erwin Mussener
- Ferdinand McKay: Karl-Heinz Schnibbe
- Daf Thomas: Rudolf Wobbe
- Nye Occomore: Salomon Schwarz
- Joanna Christie: Emma Hübener
- Sean Mahon: Hugo Hübener
- Sylvie Varcoe: Elli Kluge
- Ben Dilloway: Julius Wangemann
- Daniel Betts: Arthur Zander
- Celinde Schoenmaker: Anne Mussener
- Aaron Zicman: Max Mussener
- Gwenver Farnworth: Lisl Mussener
- Christos Lawton: Heinrich Mohns
- Dominic Mafham: Judge Karl Engert
- Gabriel Scott: Werner Kranz
- John Sackville: Hans Knie
- Elvinas Juodkazis: Albert Holz
- Maxim Ays: Gerhard Kunkle
- Sam Pamphilon: Otto Berndt
- Brian Caspe: Judge Waldemar Fikeis
- Matthew Castle: Rolf Brenner

== Production ==
The project was originally announced as a limited series titled Truth & Conviction, but shortly after filming began, it was decided to release the project as both a film and as a limited series. Filming began in Vilnius, Lithuania on April 29, 2024 and continued for fifty days.

The film was executive produced by Russ Kendall, John Foss and Jon Erwin, with Kaleidoscope Pictures serving as the production company. The cinematography was done by Bianca Cline.

== Music ==
The score for the film was composed by Aaron Zigman.

== Release ==
Truth & Treason was released in the United States theaters on October 17, 2025, by Angel Studios.

Also on October 17, the first two episodes of Truth & Treason: Limited Series, a four-part limited series that tells an expanded version of the story, were released on Angel's platform. The third episode is slated for release on October 31, 2025, and the fourth episode is slated for release on November 7, 2025.

=== Home media ===
The film was released digitally on December 2, 2025, followed by its Blu-ray and DVD release on January 20, 2026.

== Reception ==
On the review aggregator website Rotten Tomatoes, 86% of 22 critics' reviews are positive. Audiences polled by CinemaScore gave the film an average grade of "A" on an A+ to F scale.

In a review for the New York Times, Glenn Kenny wrote: "No matter its flaws, 'Truth & Treason' is very well acted. Rupert Evans stands out as Erwin Mussener, the Nazi officer who’s at turns befuddled by, mildly sympathetic toward and infuriated with the anti-Hitler teens. His work, and that of Horrocks, keeps this uneven film watchable."
