= Wayne High School (Utah) =

Public high school in Utah, United States

Coordinates: 38°20′11″N 111°32′30″W

Location
- 225 North 400 West; Bicknell, (Wayne County), Utah 84715; United States

Information
- Type: Public high school
- Principal: David Chappell
- Staff: 15.05 (FTE)
- Enrollment: 190 (2024-2025)
- Student to teacher ratio: 12.62
- Colors: Purple and gold
- Nickname: Badgers

Wayne High School is a public high school located in Bicknell, Wayne County, Utah. The school serves grades 7–12.
