= Helmuth Hübener =

German teenager executed for resisting Nazism

- Helmuth Hübener, flanked by Rudolf "Rudi" Wobbe (left) and Karl-Heinz Schnibbe (right)
- Born: 8 January 1925; Hamburg, Weimar Republic
- Died: 27 October 1942 (aged 17); Plötzensee Prison, Berlin, Nazi Germany
- Cause of death: Execution by guillotine
- Known for: Youngest anti-Nazi German executed for resistance

Helmuth Günther Guddat Hübener (8 January 1925 – 27 October 1942) was a German youth who was executed at age 17 by beheading for his opposition to the Nazi regime. He was the youngest person of the German resistance to Nazism to be sentenced to death by the Sondergericht ("special court") People's Court (Volksgerichtshof) and executed.

== Life ==
Helmuth Hübener, born in Hamburg on 8 January 1925, came from an apolitical, religious family in Hamburg, Germany. He was a member of the Church of Jesus Christ of Latter-day Saints, as were his mother and grandparents. His adoptive father, Hugo, a Nazi sympathizer, gave him the name Hübener.

Since early childhood, Hübener had been a member of the Boy Scouts, an organization strongly supported at the time by the Church of Jesus Christ of Latter-day Saints, but in 1935 the National Socialists banned scouting from Germany. He then joined the Hitler Youth, as required by the government, but quit after Kristallnacht in 1938, when the Nazis, including the Hitler Youth, destroyed Jewish businesses and homes.

When one of the leaders in his local congregation undertook to ban Jews from attending its religious services, Hübener found himself at odds with the new policy, but continued to attend services with like-minded friends as the Latter-day Saints locally debated the issue. His friend and fellow resistance fighter Rudolf "Rudi" Wobbe later reported that of the 2,000 Latter-day Saints in the Hamburg area, only seven were pro-Nazi, but five of them happened to be in his and Hübener's St. Georg Branch (congregation), thus stirring controversy with the majority who were non- or anti-Nazis.

After Hübener finished middle school in 1941, he began an apprenticeship in administration at the Hamburg Social Authority (Sozialbehörde). He met other apprentices there, one of whom, Gerhard Düwer, he would later recruit into his resistance movement. At a bathhouse, he met new friends, one of whom had a communist family background and, as a result, he began listening to enemy radio broadcasts. Listening to foreign media was at the time strictly forbidden in Nazi Germany, being considered a form of treason. In the summer of that same year, Hübener discovered his older half-brother Gerhard's shortwave radio in a hallway closet. It had been purchased by Gerhard earlier that year in France. Helmuth began listening to the BBC on his own, and he used what he heard to compose various anti-National Socialist texts and anti-war leaflets, of which he also made many copies. The leaflets were designed to bring to people's attention how skewed the official reports about World War II from Berlin were, as well as to point out Adolf Hitler's, Joseph Goebbels', and other leading Nazis' criminal behaviour. Other themes covered by Hübener's writings were the war's futility and Germany's looming defeat. He also mentioned the mistreatment sometimes meted out in the Hitler Youth.

In one of his pamphlets, for example, he wrote:

"German boys! Do you know the country without freedom, the country of terror and tyranny? Yes, you know it well, but are afraid to talk about it. They have intimidated you to such an extent that you don't dare talk for fear of reprisals. Yes you are right; it is Germany – Hitler Germany! Through their unscrupulous terror tactics against young and old, men and women, they have succeeded in making you spineless puppets to do their bidding."

— Helmuth Hübener

In late 1941, his listening involved three friends: Karl-Heinz Schnibbe and Rudi Wobbe, both of whom were fellow Latter-day Saints, and later Gerhard Düwer. Hübener had them help him distribute about 39 different pamphlets, all containing typewritten material from the British broadcasts. They distributed them throughout Hamburg, using such methods as surreptitiously pinning them on bulletin boards, inserting them into letterboxes, and stuffing them in coat pockets.

== Arrest and execution ==
On 5 February 1942, Hübener was arrested by the Gestapo at his workplace, the Hamburg Social Authority in the Bieberhaus in Hamburg. While trying to translate the pamphlets into French and have them distributed among prisoners of war, he had been noticed by co-worker and Nazi Party member Heinrich Mohn, who denounced him.

On 11 August 1942, aged 17, Hübener was tried as an adult by the Special People's Court (Volksgerichtshof) in Berlin, which had jurisdiction over matters of treason. Hübener was sentenced to death by Judge Karl Engert. After the sentence was read, Hübener faced the judges and said: "Now I must die, even though I have committed no crime. So now it's my turn, but your turn will come." He hoped his confrontational tactics would focus the judges' wrath on him and spare his companions.

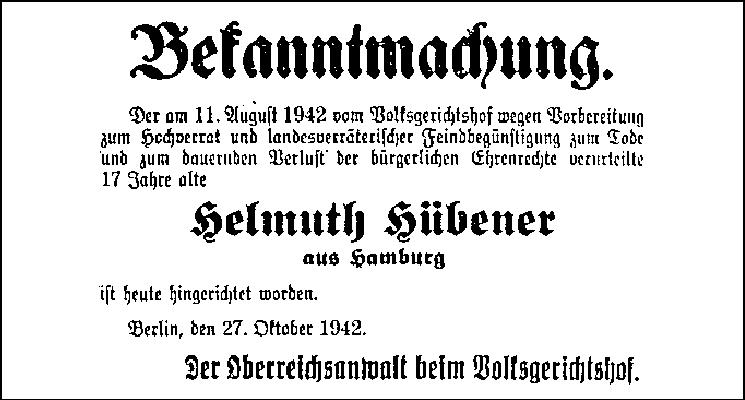
On 27 October 1942, the proclamation from the Special People's Court (Volksgerichtshof) announces Hübener's execution.

As stated in the proclamation, Hübener was found guilty of conspiracy to commit high treason and treasonous furthering of the enemy's cause. He was sentenced not only to death, but also to permanent loss of his civil rights, which meant the prison guards were allowed to torture and abuse him, and he was not allowed bedding or blankets in his cold cell.

It was highly unusual for the Nazis to try an underaged defendant, much less sentence him to death, but the court stated that Hübener had shown more than average intelligence for a boy his age. This, along with his general and political knowledge, and his behaviour before the court, made Hübener, in the court's eyes, a boy with a far more developed mind than was usually to be found in someone of his age. For this reason, the court stated, Hübener was to be punished as an adult.

Hübener's lawyers, his mother, and the Berlin Gestapo appealed for clemency in his case, hoping to have his sentence commuted to life imprisonment. In the Gestapo's eyes, the fact that Hübener had confessed fully and shown himself to be still morally uncorrupted were points in his favour. The Reich Youth Leadership (Reichsjugendführung) disagreed, however, and stated that the danger posed by Hübener's activities to the German people's war effort made the death penalty necessary. On 27 October 1942, the Nazi Ministry of Justice upheld the Special People's Court verdict. Hübener was only told of the Ministry's decision at 1:05 pm on the scheduled day of execution.

On 27 October, at 8:13 pm, he was beheaded by guillotine in the execution room at Plötzensee Prison in Berlin. His two friends, Wobbe and Schnibbe, who had also been arrested, were given prison sentences of ten years.

== Church reaction ==
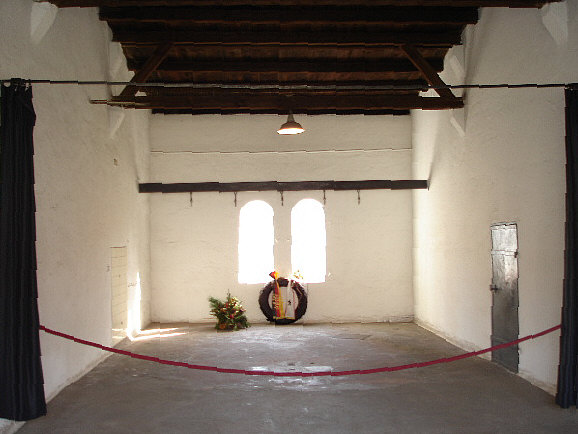
The execution chamber at Plötzensee Prison

In 1937, the president of the LDS Church, Heber J. Grant, had visited Germany and urged the members to build up the church in their home country rather than emigrate to Utah, and to follow the law of the land. Consequently, some church members saw Hübener as a troublemaker who made things difficult for other Latter-day Saints in Germany. This recommendation did not change after Kristallnacht, which occurred the year following Grant's visit, after which he evacuated all non-German Latter-day Saint missionaries.

The local Latter-day Saint branch president, Arthur Zander (1907–1989), was a supporter of the Nazi Party, and had affixed a notice to the meetinghouse entrance stating "Jews not welcome." Ten days after the arrest of Hübener, on 15 February 1942, Zander claimed to have excommunicated the young man. The district president, Otto Berndt, refused to provide the second required signature on the excommunication certificate. However, a member of the mission presidency later provided the second required leadership signature to finalize the excommunication. In a personal account, Berndt explained that he had refused to cut Hübener off from the Church, citing that while the excommunication certificate was signed by the mission authorities (i.e., a mission presidency member and branch president), he, as the District president, had protested against it and stated, "I believe that my protest and that of other members prevented the excommunication of Brothers Schnibbe and Wobbe." He further asserted, "if I had known what the boys were doing, I would have given them a helping hand." The Church also asserts that Otto Berndt did not countersign the excommunication certificate, and that Helmuth Hübener's membership was posthumously reinstated after the war ended.

The day of his execution, Hübener wrote in a letter to a fellow branch member, "I know that God lives and He will be the Just Judge in this matter... I look forward to seeing you in a better world!" This is thought to be the only surviving letter by Hübener.

In 1946, four years later and after the war, Hübener's "excommunication" was declared null and void by the Church's First Presidency and the Church's new German mission president Max Zimmer, who said the excommunication was not carried out properly. He was also posthumously ordained an elder, with full Church temple blessings restored in 1948 to clarify that his membership in the Church was never in doubt.

== Legacy ==
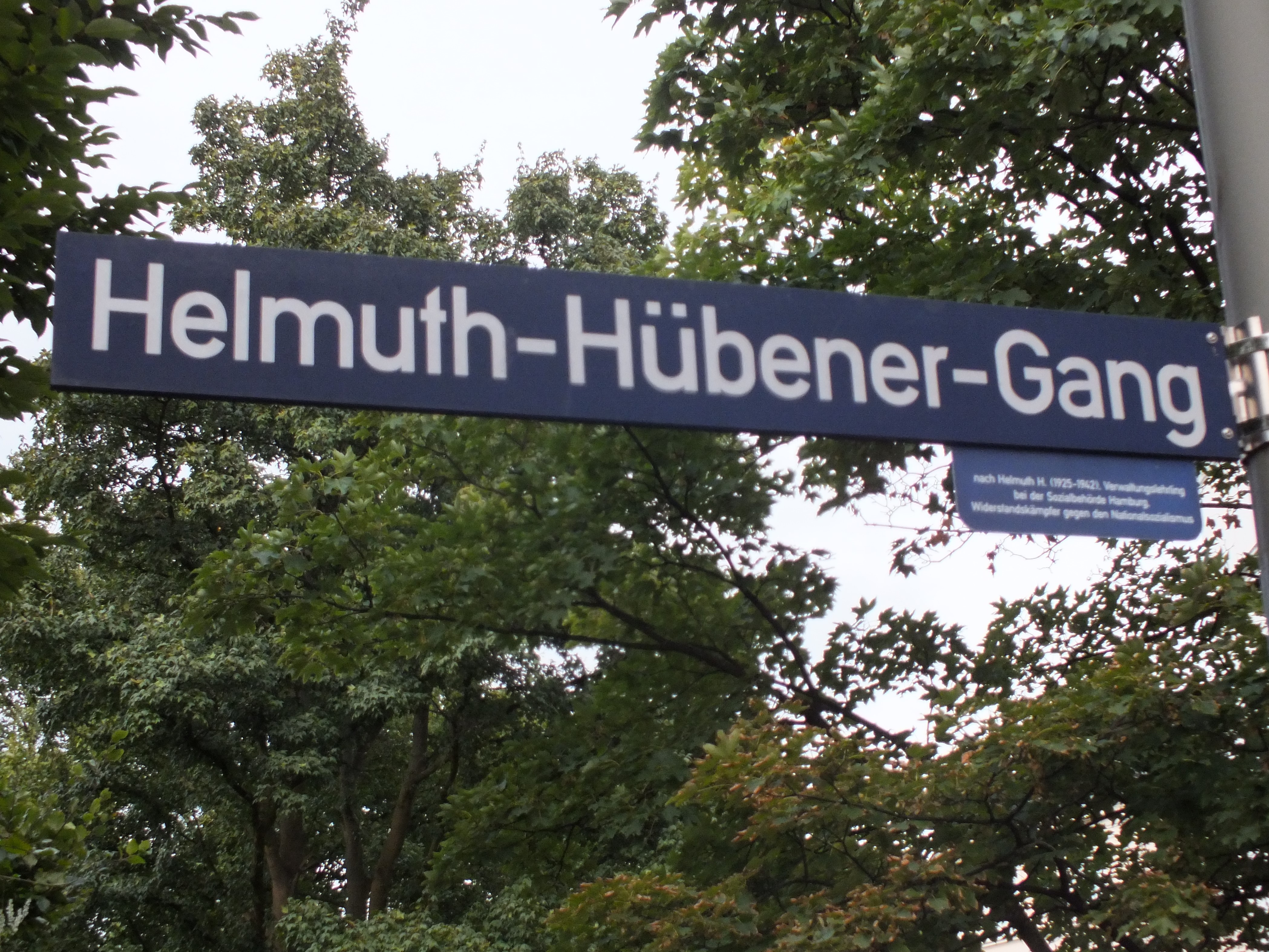
Name sign for Helmuth-Hübener-Gang in Hamburg, complete with a tag bearing a short explanation for the naming

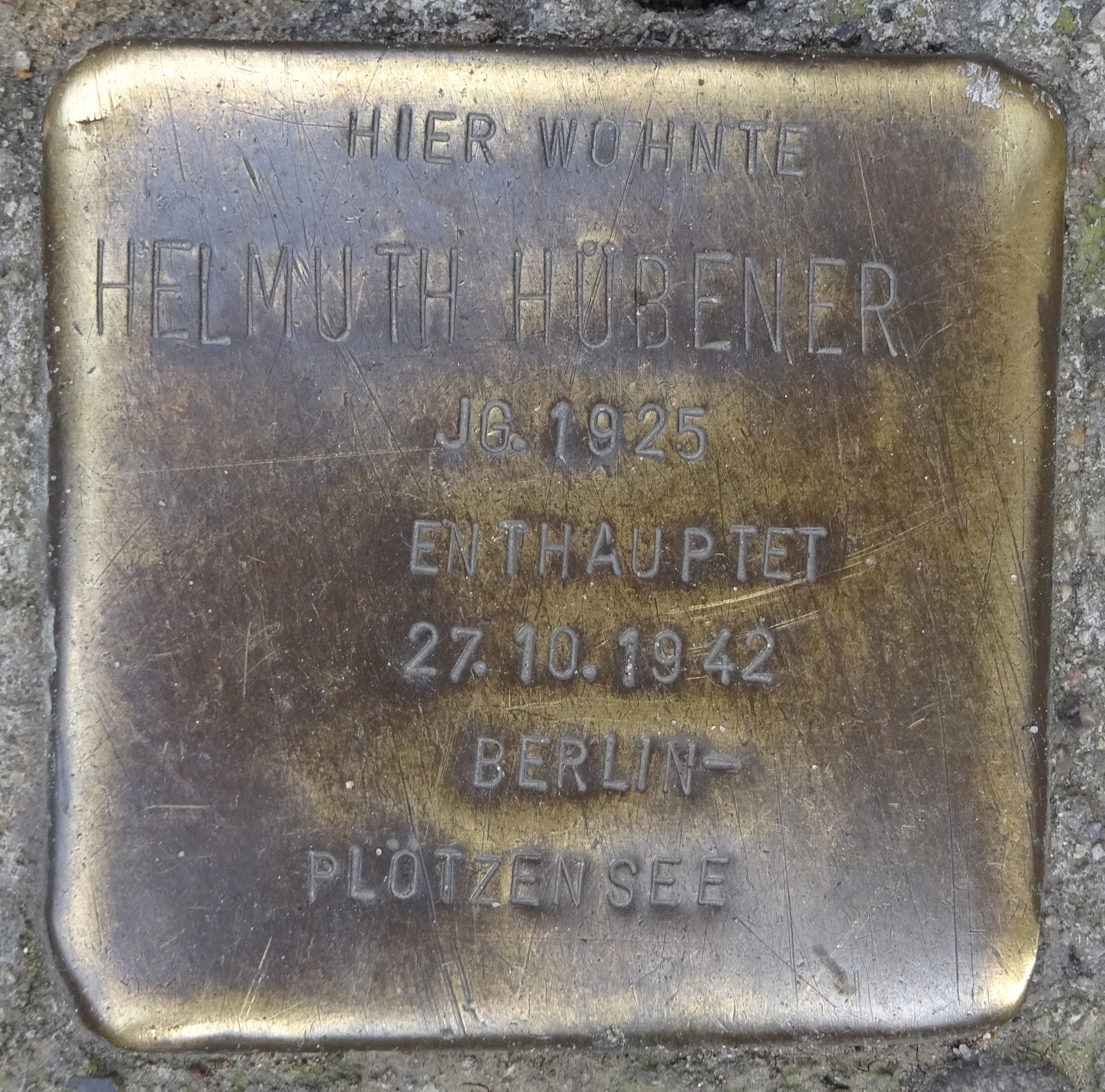
Helmuth Hübener's Stolperstein

A youth centre and school in Hamburg are named after Hübener, as is a pathway between Greifswalder Straße and Kirchenweg in St. Georg. At the former Plötzensee Prison in Berlin, an exhibit about Hübener's resistance, trial, and execution was located in the former guillotine chamber; it has since been changed to highlight other victims. Floral tributes are often placed in memory of Hübener and others executed by the Nazis there. Hübener also has a Stolperstein at Sachsenstraße 42 in Hamburg-Hammerbrook.

On 8 January 1985, exactly sixty years after Hübener's birth, ceremonies in his memory were held in Hamburg by city officials. His fellow resisters, Schnibbe and Wobbe, both of whom had emigrated to the U.S. after the war, returned to Hamburg for the commemoration, where they were honoured guests and speakers.

=== Depiction in books, drama and film ===
Hübener's story has been the subject of various literary, dramatic, and cinematic works. In 1970, German author Günter Grass published the book Local Anaesthetic, about the Hübener group.

In 1976, Thomas F. Rogers, a university teacher at Brigham Young University, wrote a play titled Huebener, which was first performed at BYU for the fall season, and has had several runs in various venues. Hübener's two co-accused friends, Karl-Heinz Schnibbe and Rudi Wobbe, attended some of the performances, albeit in different circumstances. Wobbe died of cancer in 1992; Schnibbe died in 2010. In February 2014, Huebener made its high school premiere in St. George, Utah.

In 1995, the first-hand account When Truth Was Treason was published, narrated by Karl-Heinz Schnibbe and written by Blair R. Holmes, a professional historian, and Alan F. Keele, a German-language specialist; a revised, second edition was published in 2020.

The only biography of Helmuth Hubener, Hübener vs. Hitler by Richard Lloyd Dewey, was first published in 2003 and revised in 2025. It includes interviews with all then-living friends and close relatives of Hübener, and utilizes primary investigative documents from the Nazi era.

Rudolf Gustav Wobbe (Hübener's other co-resistance fighter) wrote the book Before the Blood Tribunal. Published in 1989, the book provides a personal account of his own trial before the Special People's court of Nazi Germany where he was sentenced to 10 years in prison for his participation in anti-Nazi resistance. Rudi, as he was known, also describes events leading up to the trials of the three German youths and his own experience as a prisoner. This book was later republished as Three Against Hitler.

The 2008 juvenile novel The Boy Who Dared by Susan Campbell Bartoletti, while fictional, is based on Hübener's life. Bartoletti's earlier Newbery Honor book, Hitler Youth: Growing Up in Hitler's Shadow (2005), also covers Hübener's story.

The 2026 historical novel The Boys Who Dared Hitler by Richard Lloyd Dewey, is based on his nonfiction work. Jim Cox of Midwest Book Review and Library Bookwatch states, “Dewey has a genuine flair for character and narrative driven storytelling that fully engages the reader from start to finish," adding what differentiates it from other novels: "An unusual historical novel, it features seventy four pages of Author's Notes separating fiction from fact and is inherently fascinating in providing an historical perspective and background. Deftly crafted fiction. Unreservedly recommended."

Hübener's story was documented in the 2003 documentary Truth & Conviction, written and directed by Rick McFarland and Matt Whitaker.

The story was also depicted in Resistance Movement, an independent 2012 film.

In 2020, an exhibition about Helmuth Hübener named 'You may not know him, but....' by German artist Cordula Ditz took place at Kunsthalle Hamburg.

A narrative film adaptation of Hübener's story, titled Truth & Treason was released on 17 October 2025 by Angel in the US. The film is produced by Kaleidoscope Pictures. It opened at number 6 in domestic releases that weekend to overwhelming positive reviews at Rotten Tomatoes and IMDb metascore of 8.2.

== See also ==
- List of peace activists
