= Jericho (2016 TV series) =

- Genre: Period drama Western
- Created by: Steve Thompson
- Based on: An idea by Dave Ramage
- Written by: Steve Thompson; Chris Dunlop; Caroline Henry
- Directed by: Paul Whittington; Robert McKillop; David Moore
- Starring: Jessica Raine; Hans Matheson; Clarke Peters
- Composer: Tim Phillips
- Country of origin: United Kingdom
- Original language: English
- No. of series: 1
- No. of episodes: 8

Production
- Executive producer: Kate Bartlett
- Producer: Lisa Osborne
- Production location: Yorkshire Dales
- Running time: 65 minutes (episode 1); 45 minutes
- Production company: ITV Studios

Original release
- Network: ITV
- Release: 7 January – 25 February 2016

Jericho is a British period drama television series created and written by Steve Thompson; it was directed by Paul Whittington. It is set in the fictional town of Jericho, a shanty town in the Yorkshire Dales of England, which springs up around the construction of a railway viaduct in the 1870s. The series re-imagines the building of the Ribblehead Viaduct (renamed the Culverdale Viaduct) as a Western-style story.

The eight-part series premiered on ITV between 7 January and 25 February 2016. In April 2016, ITV confirmed that a second series of the show was not going to be commissioned. The series was available for streaming video in the USA on Acorn TV, beginning 11 July 2016.

== Premise ==
The series focuses upon the shanty town of Jericho, home to a community that will live, thrive and die in the shadow of the viaduct they have been brought together to build.

== Cast ==
- Jessica Raine as Annie Quaintain, a widow with teenage children
- Hans Matheson as Johnny Jackson, a navvy, later discovered to be John Blackwood
- Clarke Peters as Ralph Coates, a railway agent
- Mark Addy as Earl Bamford, a detective
- Dean Andrews as 'Happy' Jack Laggan, a navvy gang leader
- Lorraine Ashbourne as Lace Polly, a prostitute
- Amy James-Kelly as Martha Quaintain, Annie's daughter
- Samuel Bottomley as George Quaintain, Annie's son
- Daniel Rigby as Charles Blackwood
- Jeany Spark as Isabella Lambton
- Phil Cornwell as Joe Capstick
- Elliot Barnes-Worrell as Easter

== Production ==
Scenes were shot around Huddersfield, specifically Golcar, at the Colne Valley Museum, and on the moors above Meltham and Marsden. The main setting for the shanty town was Rockingstone Quarry. Wharncliffe Chase above Oughtibridge, north Sheffield, was another shanty town set and nearby locations were used.

== Episodes ==
No.	Title	Directed by	Written by	Original release date	UK viewers (millions)
1	"Episode 1"	Paul Whittington	Steve Thompson	7 January 2016	4.74
Annie Quaintain is forced out of her home when her husband dies, leaving her penniless. She seeks work at the shanty town of Jericho, together with her two teenage children. Opening a boarding house, she is befriended by Johnny Jackson, her first lodger. When the workings are sabotaged and men are killed, events take a turn for the worse for her son.
2	"Episode 2"	Paul Whittington	Steve Thompson	14 January 2016	4.20
Railway detective Bamford searches for Red Killeen and takes lodgings at Annie Quaintain's, which unsettles her son. Bamford finds a knife, leading him to suspect Killeen is dead, and discovers Coates may be behind the sabotage. Isabella finds she is unable to invest in the viaduct until she is married and makes an offer to Charles Blackwood. After meeting Coates, Bamford reports to Blackwood that Killeen has fled on a ship from Liverpool.
3	"Episode 3"	Robert McKillop	Steve Thompson	21 January 2016	3.86
Isabella and Charles Blackwood marry. Coates takes control of the sale of supplies to prevent hauliers profiteering, making enemies of hauliers, who respond by blockading the camp. One of the camp children dies of the strangling angel and Annie's daughter, Martha, falls foul of the same fever. Unable to break the blockade and fetch a doctor, Johnny Jackson takes her to Charles Blackwood's house. Johnny's real identity is exposed, causing financial complications for Charles and Isabella.
4	"Episode 4"	Robert McKillop	Steve Thompson	28 January 2016	3.65
Johnny is ostracised by the navvies and Charles refuses his offer that would save the project. Charles approaches a Methodist preacher as an investor. The pious Methodist insists the bar and prostitutes must go. When Annie discovers the preacher's son had attacked a prostitute, she herself is threatened with arrest until Johnny intervenes.
5	"Episode 5"	Robert McKillop	Chris Dunlop	4 February 2016	3.73
Charles cannot pay the wages and the men strike. He issues credit notes to be used in Jericho to buy goods and services. Johnny declares they are worthless and some men decide to rob Charle's house. Charles and Isabella are forced to listen to Johnny and mortgage the house; in return Johnny becomes a partner.
6	"Episode 6"	David Moore	Chris Dunlop	11 February 2016	3.83
Charles needs to quarry stone and the only stone available is the burial site of the navvies killed at the workings. When the bodies are moved, Red Killeen is discovered buried underneath the coffins. Coates finds evidence, the blanket Killeen is buried in, and is convinced Johnny is responsible. Charles discovers his wife had an affair with Johnny before they married, and their thawing relationship freezes again. To protect the real culprit, Johnny flees Jericho but is brought back by Coates to face justice.
7	"Episode 7"	David Moore	Caroline Henry	18 February 2016	3.70
Johnny is imprisoned by Coates, who refuses to send for a magistrate. The navvies are goaded by one of their number to hang Johnny for the murder of Red Killeen. Coates arranges a hearing in the bar that he can manipulate to ensure Johnny's hanging, despite knowing who the real killer is. Annie is cross examined and her daughter, Martha, denounces Johnny. Charles and Isabella head to the camp in time to hear the real killer confess.
8	"Episode 8"	David Moore	Steve Thompson	25 February 2016	3.71
Johnny fires Coates. Intending to quarry their own stone, a mine is constructed. During an inspection and subsequent cave-ins, Johnny, Charles, and Dagger are trapped. Coates has Davey Sharpe get gunpowder from the store using a key he had. The gunpowder effects a rescue but Charles is badly injured and Isabella needs Johnny's help to run the business. Annie is not happy but refuses Johnny's offer of marriage. Davey Sharpe asks Coates why he had a key to the gunpowder store. Later that evening as Davey walks to his wedding, he is shot.

== Reception ==
The series received mixed reviews from critics. The Guardian's Lucy Mangan, reviewing the first episode, remarked that the presentation was a bit too clean for the setting but praised the cast and ending. Jasper Rees of The Telegraph commended the ambition of the creators, but found the first episode's drama to be 'busy' and the genre confused. Andrew Billen of The Times gave it three stars, being unimpressed by the show's characters. Thea Lenarduzzi of The Independent, on the other hand, found the first episode to be gripping and full of excitement.

== See also ==
- The English, a 2022 British Western TV series
