= Joseph Brookbank =

English cleric and schoolmaster

Joseph Brookbank, Brooksbank, or Brookesbank (born 1612) was an English cleric and schoolmaster.

== Life ==
Brookbank was the son of George Brookbank of Halifax; at Michaelmas term 1632, when he entered Brasenose College, Oxford as a batler (poor scholar), he was aged twenty. He graduated B.A. and took orders.

In the Bodleian is the printed petition to the king, in September 1647, from John Brookbank and thirty-three other ministers, expelled from Ireland by the rebels. This John is probably identical with the subject of this article, who is called John on the title-pages of his Vitis Salutaris (1650) and Compleat School-Master (1660).

In 1650 Brookbank described himself as "at present preacher of the word" at West Wycombe (he spells it Wickham). Buckinghamshire. It is probable that he was settled at Wycombe at the date (1648) of his sermon on the Saints' Imperfection, and possible that he replaced Peel there, silenced either at High or West Wycombe on 16 January 1640. Brookbank in 1651 was "presbyter and schoolmaster in Vine Court, in High Holborn" where his books were to be bought. At this date he speaks of Sir Edward Richards, knt., and his wife as patrons. In 1654 he was "minister and schoolmaster in Jerusalem Court, in Fleet Street".

By 1657 he had lost both employments, and on 4 July 1660 (while living in George Alley, Shoe Lane) he expressed his gratitude to Sir Jeremiah Whitchcot. It is possible that he was the I. B. who, early in 1665, published A Tast of Catechetical-Preaching-Exercise for the instruction of families. The writer speaks of himself as aged, and proposes a plan of religious services for the young. His name appears as Brookbank in his earliest publication; afterwards as Brooksbank, Brooksbanke, Brookesbanke, and on one of his title-pages as Broksbank. He Latinises it into Riparius. His Christian name is sometimes printed Jo., and this is expanded into John by mistake. The explanation which he gives of his distance from the press may account for some of the variations in his title-pages. His catechism gives the impression that he was an evangelical churchman: his educational works are careful.

== Works ==
Brookbank published:

- Joh. Amos Comenii Vestibulum Novissimum Linguæ Latinæ, &c. Joh. Amos Comenius His Last Porch of the Latin Tongue, &c., 1647. The Latin of Comenius is given on alternate pages with an English version from the Dutch of Henry Schoof compared with the original.
- The Saints' Imperfection. &c., 1646 (but corrected by Thompson to 19 December 1648). A sermon on Heb. v. 12; the title-page is otherwise faulty; it was reissued with new title-page in 1656.
- Vitis Salutaris: Or, the Vine of Catechetical Divinitie, and Saying Truth, 1650. A catechism dedicated to parishioners of West Wycombe; a reissue in 1658 had a new title-page, and omitted the dedication.
- An English Monosyllabary, 1651. Dedicated to Susan, wife of Edward Trussell, and her sister Philadelphia, daughters of Sir Edward Richards; containing in rhythmical form "all the words of one syllabl, in our English tongue drawne out into a legibl sens"; at the end are a few prayers in monosyllables.
- Plain. Brief, and Pertinent Rules for the Judicious and Artificial Syllabification of all English Words, 1654. With an account of the author's plan for the management of a school.
