= Mormon Literature & Creative Arts =

Latter Day Saint media database

Mormon Literature & Creative Arts is a database of Latter-day Saint media and creators. It contains entries on film, music, and writings, as well as directors, composers, and writers. It is "an important critical resource that seeks to comprehensively list literary writings and associated artistic works by and about Mormons".

As evidenced by its name, it launched as a catalogue of Mormon authors and literature in the mid-1990s by Gideon Burton, a BYU English professor. It was further expanded as a relational database called the Mormon Literature Database in 2003, and in 2007 was expanded to include other forms of media, and was newly christened Mormon Literature & Creative Arts (MLCA). It is currently sponsored by BYU's Harold B. Lee Library.
