= Karl-Heinz Schnibbe =

German resistance member (1924–2010)

- The "Hübener Group", organized by Helmuth Hübener, who printed and distributed anti-Nazi leaflets in Hamburg in the early 1940s (Right: Karl-Heinz Schnibbe)
- Born: January 5, 1924; Hamburg, Germany
- Died: May 9, 2010 (aged 86); Holladay, Utah, United States
- Writing career
- Notable works: The Price (autobiography), When Truth Was Treason: German Youth Against Hitler:The Story of the Helmuth Hubener Group (memoir).

Karl-Heinz Schnibbe (January 5, 1924 – May 9, 2010) was a German Resistance to Nazism member during World War II who, as a 17-year-old growing up in Nazi Germany in 1941, was an accomplice in a plan by three German teenagers, members of the Church of Jesus Christ of Latter-day Saints (LDS), to distribute information to the citizens of Germany on the evils of the Nazi regime during World War II. Led by 16-year-old Helmuth Hübener, the three boys created, posted and distributed cards and pamphlets denouncing Hitler and the Nazi Party. They were eventually caught by the Gestapo and, after repeated beatings, were convicted and sentenced. Hübener was executed, the youngest person to be sentenced to death for opposing the Third Reich, and Schnibbe was sentenced to five years in a labor camp. After the war and his release from a Soviet POW camp, Schnibbe emigrated to the United States in 1952, living in the Salt Lake City, Utah area until his death on May 9, 2010.

== Early life ==
Schnibbe joined the Hitler Youth at the age of twelve, against the wishes of his father, and was sworn in on April 20, 1936 (Hitler's birthday). At first, he was entranced by the campfires and parades in which the Hitler Youth participated, but eventually grew weary of the constant pressure and conformity. He was expelled from the organization for punching his youth leader in the face, and was relieved that he had finally gotten out of the group's clutches. He later became active in resistance during World War II in 1941.

== Resistance activities ==
Schnibbe and his friend Helmuth Hübener often listened to the German-language broadcast of the BBC on Hübener's shortwave radio. Listening to radio stations not approved by the Nazis was illegal, but they were both intrigued by the differences in information that the legal German stations reported and the British newscasts. They both concluded that the German stations were spouting propaganda and withholding the real information from German citizens. Hübener decided that he had to do something about this, to inform the public that the Nazi Government was lying to them. He began typing up articles critical of the government and Hitler. Though originally apprehensive of his friend's work, Schnibbe began helping Hübener's cause, along with 15-year-old Rudolf Wobbe, the third member of the teenage group, and started distributing flyers throughout the city of Hamburg. He constantly was on the lookout for the numerous Nazi informants that lurked in the city. The boys agreed that if one of them was captured, that boy would take full responsibility for the work and protect the other two. They distributed flyers for several months, putting them in mail boxes and dropping them in public places. The Gestapo began an investigation to find the authors, and they found out that Hübener was involved. Helmuth was especially confrontational in Court, keeping the anger directed at himself, which spared the lives of the two other boys from the death penalty, and Schnibbe and Wobbe were sentenced to five years and ten years imprisonment, respectively, while Hübener was executed by beheading.

== Aftermath ==
Schnibbe was released from prison to serve in the Wehrmacht before the end of World War II. After he was captured by advancing Soviet forces, he was held as a prisoner of war in a Soviet POW labour camp for four years. He eventually emigrated to the United States and lived in the Salt Lake City, Utah area. On 8 January 1985, Schnibbe and Wobbe were honored guests and speakers at ceremonies held in Hamburg by city officials to commemorate Hübener's death and their heroic resistance. The previous year, Schnibbe had written a book about his experience, The Price: The True Story of a Mormon Who Defied Hitler. Later, in 1995, that book was substantially revised by Schnibbe himself, as well as co-authors Alan F. Keele and Blair R. Holmes, in a book entitled When Truth Was Treason, (University of Illinois Press and Academic Research Foundation/Stratford Books of Provo, Utah). Schnibbe died from Parkinson's disease in a care facility in Holladay, Utah on May 9, 2010.

== Media ==
The story of Schnibbe and his youthful comrades was documented in the 2003 film Truth & Conviction, written and directed by Rick McFarland and Matt Whitaker. The film was later released on DVD, sponsored by the BYU College of Humanities.

2025 film by Angel Studios called Truth and Treason tells the story of the 3 boys.
