= Hannah Onslow =

English actress

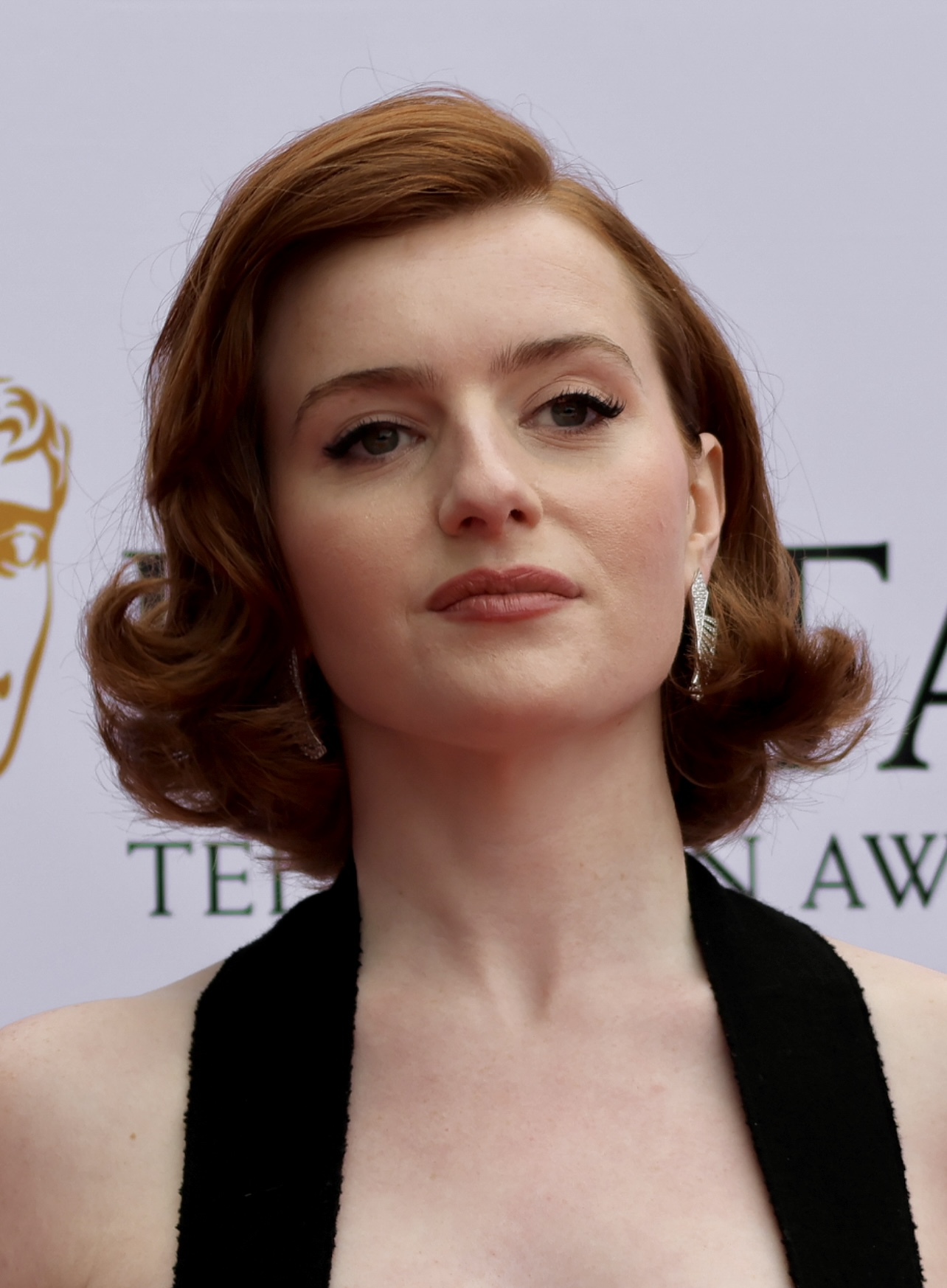
- Onslow at the 2026 British Academy Television Awards
- Born: Hannah Lucy Onslow; 1998 (age 27–28); Romford, Greater London, England
- Education: RADA
- Years active: 2020–present

Hannah Lucy Onslow (born 1 April 1998) is an English actress. Her films include Empire of Light (2022) and Unicorns (2023). On television, she appeared in the BBC One series This Is Going to Hurt (2022) and This City Is Ours (2025), the Paramount+ series The Doll Factory (2023), and the MGM+ series Belgravia: The Next Chapter (2024).

== Early life ==
Onslow is from Romford, Greater London. She attended the BRIT School and went on to graduate from the Royal Academy of Dramatic Art (RADA) in 2019 with a Bachelor of Arts degree in Acting.

== Career ==
Onslow made her television debut in a 2020 episode of the BBC One series Call the Midwife. The following year, she played Elise in the drama Ridley Road, also on BBC One. In 2022, Onslow made her feature film debut as Janine in Sam Mendes' Empire of Light with Micheal Ward and Olivia Colman, and played patient Erika van Hegen in the BBC One medical drama This Is Going to Hurt.

In 2023, Onslow appeared in the drama film Unicorns as Emma, and had a recurring role portraying Pre-Raphaelite model Elizabeth Siddal in the Paramount+ series The Doll Factory. She has an upcoming role in Helen Edmundson's Belgravia: The Next Chapter for MGM+.

In March 2025, she played the main role of Diana, girlfriend of drug lord wannabe Michael Kavanagh (played by James Nelson-Joyce), alongside Sean Bean, Julie Graham, and Jack McMullen in the BBC One Liverpool-based gangster television series, This City Is Ours (2025).

Onslow was cast in the premiere of Helen Edmundson's play Some Woman at the Dorfman Theatre, London, in August 2026.

== Filmography ==
=== Film ===
Year	Title	Role	Notes
2022	Empire of Light	Janine	
2023	Indiana Jones and the Dial of Destiny	Student	
2023	Unicorns	Emma	

=== Television ===
Year	Title	Role	Notes
2020	Call the Midwife	Connie Blair	1 episode
2021	Ridley Road	Elise	Miniseries, 3 episodes
2022	This Is Going to Hurt	Erika van Hegen	Miniseries, 6 episodes
2023	The Doll Factory	Lizzie Siddal	5 episodes
2024	Belgravia: The Next Chapter	Emily Dunn	Miniseries
2025–present	This City Is Ours	Diana Williams	Main role; 16 episodes
2026	Big Mood	Whitney	5 episodes
