= David Westhead =

English actor

- Born: David William Logan Westhead; 1 June 1963 (age 63); Ely, Cambridgeshire, England, UK
- Occupation: Actor
- Years active: 1988–present

David William Logan Westhead (born 1 June 1963) is an English actor.

== Early life ==
Westhead was born in Ely, Cambridgeshire. He studied drama at Bristol University before going on to RADA, from where he graduated in 1987, after which he joined the Actors' Touring Company.

== Career ==
He is notable as having been a member of the regular cast of The Bill, Criminal Justice, Blackeyes, Stanley and the Women, Bramwell, The Silence, Life Begins, The Lakes, Grafters, The Time of Your Life and W1A. He has also had guest appearances in Wycliffe (Wycliffe and the Pea Green Boat as Freddie Tremaine), Doctor Who (The Shakespeare Code, as William Kempe), Fast Freddie, The Widow and Me as Charlie, Foyle's War (A War of Nerves), Midsomer Murders (The House in the Woods), Agatha Christie's Poirot (Cards on the Table) and Lewis (The Gift of Promise). He has also appeared in the film Mrs Brown (as the Prince of Wales), and onstage he has played Tristan Tzara in a 1993 British production of Travesties, which The Observer review said "David Westhead's Tzara [is] blissfully adept and funny".

Westhead has for many years been a leading actor with The Royal Shakespeare Company, Royal National Theatre, and The Royal Court Theatre. His credits include the BAFTA nominated Donovan Quick, Wilde, Stage Beauty, 'Beyond the Sea', Golden Globe winning Gideon's Daughter, Wallis & Edward, 'Beneath the Skin', Emmy Award winning The Lost Prince, 'She's Gone', 'The Time of Your Life', 'The Key', 'Safe House', 'The Lakes', Turning World, Grafters, 'The Unknown Soldier', My Fragile Heart, Blackeyes. Westhead has the title role in "Suicide Man" and has appeared in "The Real McCoy" for the BBC in the Cape Flats Townships of South Africa. In 2010 he starred as Frank Evans in the BBC's flagship drama "The Silence".

In 2002 he and two colleagues founded Wilton Pictures, a production company specialising in making documentaries.

Also a lecturer in drama it was whilst he was teaching in South Africa that he met a group of disadvantaged youngsters with potential as photographers. Along with professional photographer John Cole – who, like Westhead, lives in Brighton – he put them on an eight-week crash course in photography, enabling them to make a professional living from it. The exhibition of their work, entitled 'Wembley to Soweto', was exhibited at London's South Bank in July 2011. He received the Media Society's 2013 bursary award for this project.

In 2014, he played Neil Reid in W1A.

In 2016, Westhead played the role of Tony Blair's minder in the BBC television film Reg. In 2016, he appeared in the Netflix comedy series Lovesick.

He played Prime Minister John Vosler in the 2018 BBC series Bodyguard.

== Filmography ==
=== Film ===
Year	Title	Role	Notes
1997	Mrs Brown	Bertie, Prince of Wales	
1997	Wilde	Edward Carson	
1997	Daylight Robbery	Alf	Short films
1999	Between Dreams		Short films
2001	Queen's Messenger	Sir Desmond Grey	
2004	Stage Beauty	Harry	
2004	Beyond the Sea	Dr. Fields	Uncredited role
2009	Suicide Man	Frank Richards	Short film
2011	The Iron Lady	Labour Shadow Minister	
2011	Nancy, Sid & Sergio	DI Palmer	Short films
2011	The North London Book of the Dead	Boss	Short films
2012	Los Jack Machine	(voice)	Short films
2013	Dun Punkin: Ep.1 - 'Boys Will Be Boys'	The Cook	Short films
2017	The Fox and the Rabbit	Francis's Father	Short films
2020	If It's Not too Late	Jimmy	Short films
2021	Dust to Dust	Peter Woods	Short films
2022	Enola Holmes 2	Henry Lyon	
2024	Alice	Dominic Halford	Short film (completed)

=== Television ===
Year	Title	Role	Notes
1985	Jenny's War	Navigator	Episodes 1–4. Uncredited role
1989	Blackeyes	Mark Wilsher	Miniseries; Episodes 2–4
1991	Stanley and the Women	Stillsman	Miniseries; Episodes 1–4
1994	Wycliffe	Freddie Tremaine	Series 1; Episode 6: "The Pea Green Boat"
1995	N7	James	Television film
1995	Witness Against Hitler	Leo Lange	Television film
1996	The Bill	PC Mick Sampson	Series 12; Episode 25: "Confession"
1996	Bramwell	Paul Mills	Series 2; Episode 1: "The Rule of Thuggery"
1997	Turning World	Danny Miller	Episode 3
1997–1999	The Lakes	Arthur Thwaite	Main cast; Series 1 & 2; 5 episodes
1998	The Unknown Soldier	Jeff Quinn	Episodes 1–3
1999	Grafters	Nick Costello	Main cast; Series 2; Episodes 1–8
2000	Where the Heart Is	Mike	Series 4; Episode 2: "No Regrets"
2000	Dalziel and Pascoe	Peter Deller	Series 5; Episode 4: "Above the Law"
2000	My Fragile Heart	DCI Peter Murray	2-part miniseries
2000	Donovan Quick	George Mackie	Television film
2000	McCready and Daughter	DCI Alan Kendall	Television film (pilot for series)
2001	McCready and Daughter	DCI Alan Kendall	Episodes 1–5
2002	The Wonderful World of Disney	Van Den Meer	Episode: "Confessions of an Ugly Stepsister"
2002	Always and Everyone	Phillip Mallett	Series 4; Episode 4: "Against the State"
2002	Safe House	Father	Television film
2003	The Lost Prince	Fred	2-part miniseries
2003	William and Mary	Alistair Harper	Series 1; Episode 2
2003	Servants	Mr. Prothero	Miniseries; Episode 2
2003	The Key	Neath	Miniseries; Episodes 1–3
2003	Blue Dove	Malcolm Sharp	Miniseries (unknown episodes)
2004	Family Business	Tom Williams	Episode 2
2004	She's Gone	Peter Vine	Television film
2004	Foyle's War	Mark Talbot	Series 3; Episode 4: "A War of Nerves"
2004–2006	Life Begins	Brian Middleton	Series 1–3; 10 episodes
2005	Beneath the Skin	Dominic Hintlesham	Television film
2005	Born and Bred	Silas Craddock	Series 4; Episode 10: "Someone to Watch Over Me"
2005	Rose and Maloney	Wallace Canford	Series 3; Episodes 1–3: "Carl Callaghan", "Annie Johnson" and "Alan Richmond"
2005	Midsomer Murders	Gerry Moore	Series 9; Episode 1: "The House in the Woods"
2005	Wallis & Edward	Ernest Simpson	Television film
2006	Gideon's Daughter	Bill	Television film
2006	Agatha Christie's Poirot	Superintendent Jim Wheeler	Series 10; Episode 2: "Cards on the Table"
2007	Wild at Heart	Bennett	Series 2; Episode 3: 2.3
2007	Doctor Who	William Kempe	Series 3; Episode 2: "The Shakespeare Code"
2007	The Time of Your Life	Dave	Miniseries; Episodes 1–6
2008	Criminal Justice	Barry Coulter	Series 1; Episodes 1–5
2009	Moving Wallpaper	Gareth	Series 2; Episode 6: "Renaissance Part VI"
2009	New Tricks	Mike Barnes	Series 6; Episode 5: "Death of a Timeshares Salesman"
2009	Murderland	Tony Philips	Miniseries; Episodes 1–3. Uncredited role
2010	The Silence	Superintendent Frank Evans	Miniseries; Episodes 1–4
2011	The Runaway	Ron Carver	Miniseries; Episodes 1 & 2
2011	Lewis	Leon Suskin	Series 5; Episode 4: "The Gift of Promise"
2011	Fast Freddie, The Widow and Me	Charlie Archer	Television film
2012	DCI Banks	Gareth Lambert	Series 2; Episodes 1 & 2: "Strange Affair": Parts 1 & 2
2013	Silent Witness	DI Bob Cherry	Series 16; Episodes 7 & 8: "Legacy – Part 1 & "Part 2"
2014	Endeavour	Val Todd	Series 2; Episode 1: "Trove"
2014	Common	Barnes-Williams	Television film
2014–2020	W1A	Neil Reid	Series 1–4; 14 episodes
2015	The Coroner	Grantham Naseby	Series 1; Episode 6: "Capsized"
2016	Jericho	Jonas Sorsby	Episode 4
2016	Reg	Tony Blair's minder	Television film
2016	Lovesick	Alexander	Series 2; Episode 5: "Isabel"
2017	Loaded	Lawyer	Episode 1: "Lawsuit"
2018	Bodyguard	Prime Minister John Vosler	Episodes 2–4
2024	Strike	Grant Ledwell	Series 6; Episodes 1–4

== Theatre ==
Date	Title	Role	Director	Company / Theatre
1981 – 1982	The Critic		Richard Brandon	Drama Department, Bristol University
1981 – 1982	All the Interesting Characters Are Already Dead		Frank Stirling	Drama Department, Bristol University
1982 – 1983	The Cuckoo and the Owl		Oliver Neville	Drama Department, Bristol University
1982 – 1983	The Bloom of the Diamond Stone		Emer Gillespie	Drama Department, Bristol University
1983 – 1984	Ivanov		Oliver Neville	Drama Department, Bristol University
1983 – 1984	The Innocent Mistress		Martin White	Drama Department, Bristol University
1983 – 1984	Four Doctors		Edward Braun	Drama Department, Bristol University
1989 – 1990	The School for Wives		Annie Castledine	Derby Playhouse
30 November 1989 – 20 January 1990	A Study in Scarlet	Dr. John Watson	Michael Crompton	Greenwich Theatre
16 January 1992 –	All My Sons	George Deever	David Thacker	Young Vic, London
21 April 1992 –	A Jovial Crew	Randall	Max Stafford-Clark	Royal Shakespeare Company / Swan Theatre, Stratford-upon-Avon
1992 – 1993	A Jovial Crew	Randall	Max Stafford-Clark	Royal Shakespeare Company / Barbican Theatre, London
22 February 1993 – 27 February 1993	A Jovial Crew	Randall	Max Stafford-Clark	Royal Shakespeare Company / Newcastle Playhouse
22 April 1993 – 1993	A Jovial Crew	Randall	Max Stafford-Clark	Royal Shakespeare Company / The Pit, London
2 July 1992 –	The Odyssey	Nestor	Gregory Doran	Royal Shakespeare Company / The Other Place, Stratford-upon-Avon
1992 – 1993	The Odyssey	Nestor	Gregory Doran	Royal Shakespeare Company / Barbican Theatre, London
22 June 1993 – 1993	The Odyssey	Nestor	Gregory Doran	Royal Shakespeare Company / The Pit, London
1 September 1992 – 1993	Tamburlaine	Cosroe & Orcanes	Terry Hands	Royal Shakespeare Company / Swan Theatre, Stratford-upon-Avon
14 October 1993 – 1993	Tamburlaine	Cosroe & Orcanes	Terry Hands	Royal Shakespeare Company / Barbican Theatre, London
3 November 1992 – 1993	The Changeling	Antonio	Michael Attenborough	Royal Shakespeare Company / Swan Theatre, Stratford-upon-Avon
1992 – 1993	The Changeling	Antonio	Michael Attenborough	Royal Shakespeare Company / Barbican Theatre, London
1 March 1993 – 9 March 1993	The Changeling	Antonio	Michael Attenborough	Royal Shakespeare Company / Newcastle Playhouse
25 May 1993 – 1993	The Changeling	Antonio	Michael Attenborough	Royal Shakespeare Company / The Pit, London
4 Jan 1993 – 17 Jan 1993	A Corpse with Feet	Performer	Ron Cook	Buzz Goodbody Studio, The Other Place, Stratford-upon-Avon
16 September 1993 – 1994	Travesties	Tristan Tzara	Adrian Noble	Royal Shakespeare Company / Barbican Theatre, London
24 March 1994 – 4 June 1994	Travesties	Tristan Tzara	Adrian Noble	Royal Shakespeare Company / Savoy Theatre, London
22 September 1994 – 18 February 1995	The Man of Mode	Mr. Dorimant	Max Stafford-Clark	Out of Joint and Royal Court Theatre / Royal Court Theatre, London, Theatre Royal, Bury St Edmunds, and other locations
October 1994 – 18 February 1995	The Libertine	John Wilmot, Earl of Rochester	Max Stafford-Clark	Out of Joint and Royal Court Theatre / Royal Court Theatre, London, Warwick Arts Centre, and other locations
13 April 1996 – 1996	The Prince's Play	HRH The Prince of Wales	Richard Eyre	National Theatre / Olivier Theatre, London
29 April 1998 –	Talk of the City	Robbie	Stephen Poliakoff	Royal Shakespeare Company / Swan Theatre, Stratford-upon-Avon
10 February 1999 –	Talk of the City	Robbie	Stephen Poliakoff	Royal Shakespeare Company / Young Vic, London
Jan 2003 –	Almost Nothing			Royal Court Theatre, London
28 February 2007 – 24 March 2007	Macbeth	Macbeth	Ian Brown	West Yorkshire Playhouse / Quarry Theatre, Leeds

== Audio work ==
Voice talent : Eric Ambler's Topkapi for BBC Radio 4 Extra
