= Five Daughters =

Television series

- Genre: Drama
- Written by: Stephen Butchard; Julie Rutterford
- Directed by: Philippa Lowthorpe
- Starring: Jaime Winstone; Juliet Aubrey; Eva Birthistle; Ian Hart; Sarah Lancashire; Aisling Loftus; Holliday Grainger; Martin Compston; Matt Berry
- Country of origin: United Kingdom
- Original language: English
- No. of episodes: 3

Production
- Running time: 60 minutes

Original release
- Network: BBC One
- Release: 25 April – 27 April 2010

Five Daughters is a British television drama starring Ian Hart, Sarah Lancashire, Jaime Winstone and Juliet Aubrey. Set in 2006, it is about the five victims of the Ipswich serial murders and how the crime affected their families. It was written by Stephen Butchard and Julie Rutterford. It was shown on BBC One in three one-hour episodes from 25 to 27 April 2010.

== Background ==
The BBC Press Office announced on 29 August 2009 that it had commissioned a three-part drama which would portray the events surrounding the 2006 Ipswich murders, and that it would be written by Stephen Butchard, whose credits included the 2008 mini-series House of Saddam. Speaking about the drama, Butchard said; "Our hope is that this drama provides a glimpse of the real girls their families knew, and also leads to further debate on the impact of drugs and sex industries upon every town, every city in this country... and what action is, or isn't, being taken."

With the advice of police liaison officers, BBC drama producers approached the families of the five victims of Steve Wright with a view to producing a drama about the case, and eventually secured the support of three of the families for the film. Stephen Butchard travelled to Ipswich as part of his research, speaking to police, members of a local drug rehabilitation charity and the families of the victims in an attempt to piece together the final days of the five women who were Wright's victims.

Filming began in November 2009, and the series was broadcast on BBC One from 25 to 27 April 2010. Only a few days after the BBC's announcement of the drama, Brian Clennell, the father of one of the victims, Paula Clennell, expressed fears that it would portray the victims in "a bad light". Wright's brother David complained that it would jeopardise any future retrial.

It was directed by Philippa Lowthorpe whose previous credits include The Other Boleyn Girl.

== Cast ==
- Ian Hart as DCS Stewart Gull
- Sarah Lancashire as Rosemary Nicholls
- Natalie Press as Paula Clennell
- Eva Birthistle as Annette Nicholls
- Jaime Winstone as Anneli Alderton
- Aisling Loftus as Gemma Adams
- Juliet Aubrey as Marie Alderton
- Holliday Grainger as Alice
- Ruth Negga as Rochelle
- Christopher Fairbank as DCI John Quinton
- Vicky McClure as Stacy Nicholls
- Sean Harris as Brian Tobin
- David Bradley as Patrick Palmer
- Kate Dickie as Isabella Clennell
- Anton Lesser as Dr Nat Cary
- Adam Kotz as D/Supt Andy Henwood
- Lisa Millett as PC Janet Humphrey
- Matt Berry as Mirror Journalist
- Martin Compston as Jon (Boyfriend of Gemma Adams)

== Episodes ==
No.	Episode	Directed by	Written by	Original release date	UK viewers (millions)
1	Episode 1	Philippa Lowthorpe	Stephen Butchard and Julie Rutterford	25 April 2010	N/A
This episode focuses on Anneli Alderton, her mother and brother, while also introducing the other women and their families in the weeks leading up to their disappearances and deaths.
2	Episode 2	Philippa Lowthorpe	Stephen Butchard and Julie Rutterford	26 April 2010	N/A
The discovery of two bodies in quick succession brings fear and panic to the streets of Ipswich.
3	Episode 3	Philippa Lowthorpe	Stephen Butchard and Julie Rutterford	27 April 2010	N/A
Two bodies, thought to be those of Annette Nicholls and Paula Clenell, are discovered. This episode focuses on how their families coped with the unfolding tragedies and learn how, seventeen days after the discovery of the first victim, the police finally closed the net on the murderer.

== Reception ==
The drama was generally received positively. Andrea Mullaney of The Scotsman wrote; "This was well acted and sensitively told, but very hard to watch." A television review in The Guardian said of the drama; "The three-part serial about the 2006 Ipswich killings was uncomfortable, emotional – and free of cop-show cliche", and that "Five Daughters was a masterclass in how to dramatise a recent news event." Tom Sutcliffe of The Independent said; "There's an established rhetoric for a crime like this in television drama and Five Daughters employed it – the sodium glare of street lights bouncing off wet tarmac, a car cruising like a shark down a rainy street, the camera tight on a pair of high heels teetering towards something dreadful. But what Butchard restored was all the moments when these women were something other than just the next victim."

The serial won particular praise for choosing to tell the story from the point of view of the victims and their families rather than from a police perspective. Typical of the comments comes from the Guardian, which said; "This haunting fact – that the women whose stories were now being told, for all the wrong reasons, would not be saved by a sudden police intervention – lay right at the heart of Five Daughters. This was not your usual police procedural, but the antithesis to it: a story about a serial killer where the drama came courtesy of the victims and their families, instead of the police and their investigation. There's an interesting contrast to be made between Five Days, the recent BBC drama broadcast in a strip of hour-long episodes that focused on police, and Five Daughters, where the detectives plodded and obeyed procedure and got lucky with some DNA." Andrea Mullaney, meanwhile, said "It's not just an interesting twist, of course" [...] "But it's also about redressing the wrong done to these victims, whose deaths meant that their lives were boiled down to the aspect they had in common, and which put them at risk: they worked as prostitutes and were, or had been, drug users."
