= Reputation (2024 film) =

2024 British crime drama

- Film poster
- Directed by: Martin Law
- Written by: Martin Law; Dean Gregson; Jordan Derbyshire
- Produced by: Martin Law
- Starring: James Nelson-Joyce; Kyle Rowe; Olivia Frances Brown
- Cinematography: Daniel Llobera
- Edited by: Michael Milligan
- Music by: Jake Bradford-Sharp
- Production company: Factory Noir
- Distributed by: Trinity Creative Partnership
- Release dates: September 29, 2024 (Spirit of Independence Film Festival); July 28, 2025 (United Kingdom)
- Running time: 82 minutes
- Country: United Kingdom
- Language: English

Reputation is a 2024 British psychological drama crime film set in the fictional Lancashire town of Dennings. Co-written, directed and produced by Martin Law, the independent film stars James Nelson-Joyce as a small time drug dealer who begins to question his life choices when his violent partner-in-crime is released from prison.

The film premiered at the Spirit of Independence Film Festival in 2024, qualifying for the British Independent Film Awards, and it has received strong reviews from critics, particularly for the performances. The film was released digitally in the UK on 28th July 2025.

== Plot ==
With more and more residents in Dennings getting hooked on "Clown" – a new form of ecstasy – it’s 30-year-old drug dealer Wes who’s cashing in. He’s happy keeping the operation small in his rough-and-ready home town; but when partner-in-crime Tommy returns from a short stint in prison, Wes starts to question if this life is for him anymore.

== Cast ==
- James Nelson-Joyce as Wes
- Kyle Rowe as Tommy
- Olivia Frances Brown as Zoe
- Kru Lundy as Vince
- Ross Thompson as Grayson
- Robyn Sass as Tasha
- Robyn Sass as Becky
- Andrew Purcell as Aidan
- Anthony Petrykowski as Prank Caller

== Production ==
=== Casting ===
Co-lead Kyle Rowe joined the cast just a few days before filming began.

=== Filming ===
Principal photography took place in Lancashire in October 2023, with filming locations including Great Harwood, Accrington, Clayton-le-Moors, Burnley and Preston. The film was shot in 9.5 days, with rehearsals taking place right before the filming of each scene.

== Reception ==
=== Critical response ===
The film has received a mixture of five, four and three star reviews.

The Radio Times gave the film four stars out of five, with critic Dave Golder writing: "First-time director Martin Law shoots in a style that wavers between the gritty realism of Nicolas Winding Refn's Pusher films and the darker end of the British TV crime show spectrum."

Critic Kevin Haldon of Nerdly described the film in his five star review as "Damn impressive", going on to say: "Everything Reputation does right, it does it VERY right."

The Guardian gave the film three stars, calling the film “A brawling portrait of British male rage... Rowe’s ferocious performance feels horribly real.”

In addition to praising the performances, critic Shahrbanoo Golmohamadi of Gazettely highlighted Martin Law’s direction in her four star review, saying: "He crafts a world that is grounded, gritty, and unflinching, a style that might be called kitchen-knife realism."

Singer Ed Sheeran rated the film three stars in his Letterboxd review, writing: "Great performances, great British movie."

=== Awards and nominations ===
In 2025, the film received a nomination for Best Independent Film at the National Film Awards UK.
