= Jack McMullen =

English actor (born 1991)

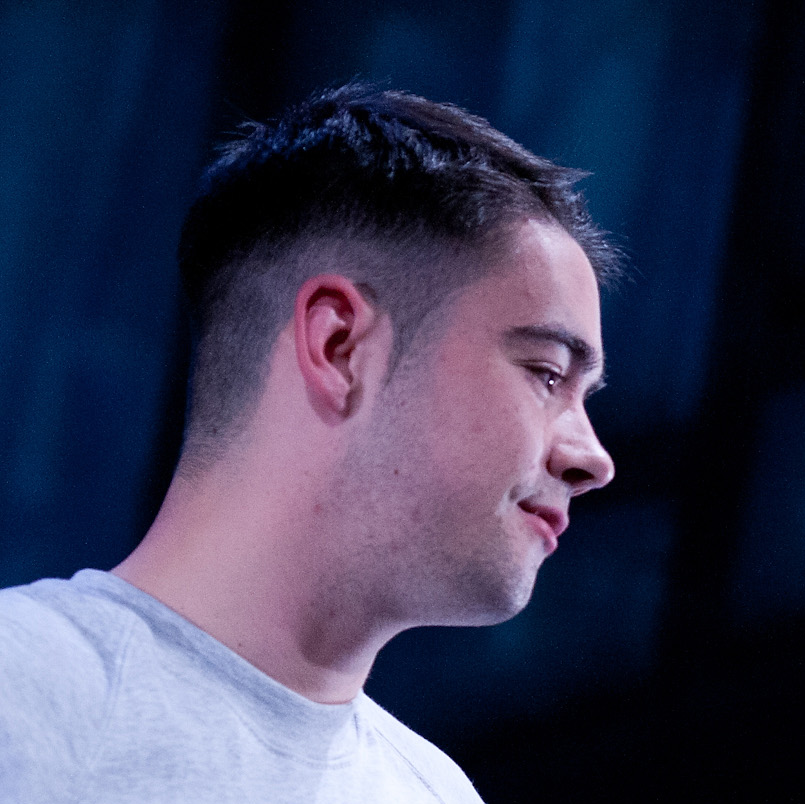
- McMullen in September 2012
- Born: Jack Michael McMullen; 22 February 1991 (age 35); Liverpool, Merseyside, England
- Occupations: Actor; writer
- Years active: 2001–present

Jack Michael McMullen (born 22 February 1991) is an English actor and writer, best known for his roles in Brookside (2002–2003), Doctors (2006), Grange Hill (2004–2008), Waterloo Road (2010–2012), Common (2014), Together (2015), Maigret Sets a Trap (2016), Little Boy Blue (2017), The First Team (2020), Time (2021), Hijack (2023), and This City Is Ours (2025).

== Career ==
As a child actor, McMullen made his television debut as Josh McLoughlin on the Channel 4 soap opera Brookside, playing the role from 2002 until the show's final episode in November 2003. He won two British Soap Awards for his role in the show; the first for Best Newcomer, and the second for Best On-Screen Partnership with co-star Sarah White. In 2004, McMullen went on to appear as Timothy "Tigger" Johnson in the long-running BBC One children's television serial, Grange Hill.

He was in an episode of the BBC One drama series The Street, then appeared in The Bill. Next, he starred in BBC Switch's Proper Messy.

In 2007, McMullen was a contestant on Ready Steady Cook.

He played half of a young gay couple who run away from their homes in an episode of the BBC One medical soap opera Doctors (2006).

From 2010 to 2012, he played troublemaker Finn Sharkey in the BBC One school-based drama series Waterloo Road. On 4 June 2011 he appeared in the BBC One medical drama series Casualty, as Ethan, the friend of a patient. On 27 December 2011, McMullen appeared in Fast Freddie, The Widow and Me.

In 2013, McMullen appeared in the film The Knife That Killed Me.

In June 2021, McMullen starred alongside Sean Bean and Stephen Graham in the BBC prison based series Time.

in 2023, he starred alongside Idris Elba, Neil Maskell, and Max Beesley for 7 episodes of the Apple TV+ aeroplane drama series Hijack (2023).

In March 2025, he played the main role of Jamie Phelan, son of drug lord Ronnie Phelan (played by Sean Bean), and Elaine Phelan (played by Julie Graham), alongside James Nelson-Joyce, in the BBC One Liverpool based gangster television series, This City Is Ours (2025).

== Filmography ==
=== Film ===
Year	Title	Role	Notes
2011	Seamonsters	Sam	
2014	The Quiet Hour	Tom Connelly	
2014	The Knife That Killed Me	Paul	
2015	Urban Hymm	Dean	
2016	The Works	Edmund	Short film
2016	Rue Boy	Flukey Dave	Short film
2016	Brotherhood	Drew	
2016	The Hatching	Russell	
2019	The Souvenir	Jack	
2019	Ford v Ferrari	Charlie Agapiou	

=== Television ===
Year	Title	Role	Notes
2002–2003	Brookside	Josh McLoughlin/Dixon	77 episodes
2004–2008	Grange Hill	Timothy "Tigger" Johnson	65 episodes
2006	Casualty	Simon Aspen	Episode: "The Truth Game"
2006	Doctors	Will Hurran	Episode: "Daddy Cool"
2007	The Street	Aran Jennerson	Episode: "Twin"
2008	The Bill	Andy Donnelly	Episodes: "Forgotten Child: Parts 1 & 2"
2009	Doctors	Jack Walters	Episode: "Bad Blood"
2009	Moving On	Daniel	Episode: "Dress to Impress"
2009	Spanish Flu: The Forgotten Fallen	Tommy	Television film
2010–2012	Waterloo Road	Finn Sharkey	56 episodes
2011	Casualty	Ethan Miles	Episode: "The Gift of Life"
2011	Fast Freddie, The Widow and Me	Freddie	Television film
2014	Common	Colin McCabe	Television film
2015	Together	Warner	Episode: "The Lovers"
2016	Maigret Sets a Trap	Mazet	Television film
2017	Little Boy Blue	Dean Kelly	3 episodes
2020	The First Team	Jack Turner	6 episodes
2021	Time	Daniel	3 episodes
2022	Screw	Connor Joyce	Series 1 Episode 3
2023	Hijack	Lewis Atterton / Ryan Cunningham	7 episodes
2025–present	This City Is Ours	Jamie Phelan	Main role; 16 episodes
