= Belgravia: The Next Chapter =

- Promotional poster
- Created by: Helen Edmundson
- Written by: Helen Edmundson
- Country of origin: United Kingdom
- Original language: English
- No. of seasons: 1
- No. of episodes: 8

Production
- Executive producers: Helen Edmundson; Julian Fellowes; Nigel Marchant; Gareth Neame; Joanna Strevens
- Producer: Colin Wratten
- Running time: 49–53 minutes
- Production company: Carnival Films

Original release
- Network: MGM+
- Release: 14 January – 10 March 2024

Related
- Belgravia

Belgravia: The Next Chapter is a British historical drama television series created by Helen Edmundson. Developed by Carnival Films for MGM+, the series serves as a sequel to Julian Fellowes' limited series Belgravia (2020), set three decades later in 1871. The series premiered on 14 January 2024.

== Cast ==
The Trenchard and Dunn families

- Harriet Slater as Clara Dunn / Clara Trenchard, daughter of deceased Hampshire patriarch Mr. Algernon Dunn
- Ben Wainwright as Lord Frederick Trenchard, raised as the son of Oliver and Susan Trenchard, but in fact the son of Susan Trenchard and John Bellasis (and thereby, grandnephew of Peregrine Bellasis, Earl of Brockenhurst, one of the richest and most prominent families in England)
- Toby Regbo as the Rev. James Trenchard, Frederick's younger and estranged brother
- Hannah Onslow as Emily Dunn, Clara's older sister
- Sophie Thompson as Mrs. Dunn, Clara and Emily's widowed mother
- Richard Goulding as Oliver Trenchard, son of James Trenchard, father of Rev. James Trenchard and parent of Frederick Trenchard
- Alice Eve as Susan Trenchard, wife of Oliver Trenchard and mother of Rev. James Trenchard and Frederick Trenchard

The Trenchard and Dunn servants

- Gerard Horan as Mr. Josiah Enright, the Trenchard butler
- Ellie Piercy as Mrs. Madeleine Enright, Trenchard household cook and wife of Mr. Enright
- Liam Garrigan as Fletcher, later revealed to be Lucian Wood, Frederick's valet
- Elaine Cassidy as Davison, Clara's maid
- Lauren McQueen as Nell, a Trenchard servant
- Daisy Sequerra as Mawdie, the Trenchard housemaid

Miscellaneous

- Edward Bluemel as Dr. Stephen Ellerby
- Claude Perron as the Marquise D'Étagnac
- Sophie Winkleman as the Duchess of Rochester
- Miles Jupp as the Duke of Rochester
- Julie Barclay as Mrs. Warren

== Episodes ==
No.	Title	Directed by	Written by	Original release date
1	"Episode 1"	John Alexander & Paul Wilmshurst	Helen Edmundson	14 January 2024
Frederick Trenchard, whose putative father was granted a peerage of a yet undisclosed rank, has been raised as the grandson and heir of a British tradesman, James Trenchard. Frederick is unaware he is the illegitimate son born from a disastrous affair between Oliver Trenchard's wife Susan and John Bellasis, the nephew of Peregrine Bellasis, Earl of Brockenhurst, a secret known only to Oliver and Susan and the reason behind Oliver's resentment towards Frederick. In Victorian 1871, at the affluent district of London known as Belgravia, a lavish home party allows wealthy Frederick to meet impoverished Clara Dunn, whom he courts and marries. Frederick remembers his ill-treated parenting by resentful Oliver Trenchard. After a honeymoon, the newlyweds return home to the Trenchard home in Eaton Square and Frederick hires Miss Davison as Clara's personal maid. Clara learns of the other Trenchard family estate of Glanville. Clara witnesses a small boy being run out of and returned to the home of the Duchess of Rochester; the boy is the Duke's heir and leads a sheltered life while being treated by Dr. Stephen Ellerby for epilepsy. At his business, Frederick sets up a stipend for the Dunn household. Clara's sister Emily attends her new church, unaware the vicar, Rev. James Trenchard, is the brother of her sister's new husband, until the two are brought together while aiding a distraught woman who unsuccessfully tries to commit suicide outside Rev. Trenchard's church. At a party, Frederick discusses business opportunities with the Trenchards' new neighbour, wealthy businesswoman and widow Marquise D'Étagnac, a refugee from a new revolutionary France. In a solitary moment, Miss Davison encounters Mr. Fletcher, with whom she shares a history, and informs him that she will not reveal his original name or past. Frederick worries after the party that the other aristocrats continue to see him as a tradesman and not one of their own class. An argument about trust upsets and disillusions Clara, who flees but winds up unconscious when she falls down the stairs. At the request of Frederick to the Duchess of Rochester, Dr. Ellerby attends to the convalescent Clara.
2	"Episode 2"	John Alexander & Paul Wilmshurst	Helen Edmundson	21 January 2024
Frederick Trenchard experiences several flashbacks to his unhappy childhood at Glanville. Frederick investigates steel-making contrary to the advice of his business manager, Mr Ross, visiting a potential factory site. Clara is unwell and refuses breakfast the morning after her fall; Frederick then apologises to Clara for the incident, for which Clara forgives him. Emily Dunn visits James Trenchard to check on the young woman rescued previously; she refuses to speak. Emily and James develop a friendship. Emily conspires with her mother to replace her maid with the young woman. The Marquise D'Étagnac and the Duke of Rochester meet to discuss further introductions to London society; the Duke finds the ease and informality displayed by the Marquise during the encounter vaguely uncomfortable. Dr Ellerby and the Duchess discuss her son's condition, against the wishes of the Duke who regards the problem as hopeless. The Marquise meets Frederick and Mr Ross on the factory site to discuss the new steel-making enterprise - she displays informed knowledge of the Bessemer process and industry in general. Frederick invites Clara to Glanville, clearly for him a significant step. He admits to James Trenchard being his brother but denies any closeness to him. He later relates how his father died and how James had been the favourite child, for which Frederick blames James. Later they together inform the staff to prepare for a dinner for 8 guests. Mr Ross flirts outrageously with Mrs Enright, the Trenchard's cook, to the disapproval of the Mr Enright, the butler. At the dinner party, Emily relates the story of Nell, the runaway girl now taken into service with the Dunns, and the connection with James Trenchard. The Marquise defends as well as condemns the revolutionaries of France, and Frederick proposes further business discussions with her. In Eaton Square early one morning, Clara meets Peter, the epileptic son of the Rochesters; Doctor Ellerby intervenes and he and Clara have words about the prior incident when she fell down the stairs. Clara questions Enright about James and Frederick as children, Mr Enright politely warns her to avoid the subject.
3	"Episode 3"	John Alexander & Paul Wilmshurst	Helen Edmundson	28 January 2024
Elsewhere, in July 1871, a crowd breaks down the fences erected by Earl Cowley in the riot of Wanstead Flats, London, and, upon returning home, Dr. Ellerby and Annie relate to Richard their assistance with the wounded. Frederick and Clara discuss baby names in hopeful anticipation. James visits the Dunn's and is introduced to Nell by name for the first time: he speaks with Nell privately and prays with her, but is unable to persuade her to reveal her past. Frederick and Mr Ross discuss persuading the Marquise to commit to their investment, Mr Ross expresses doubts about the likelihood of success. Frederick's attempts to persuade the Marquise show that she will not be rushed. The Duke and Duchess visit a sanatorium for their son's possible treatment: the Duchess is openminded but the Duke is sceptical; they argue after leaving. The Duke reveals his fears for the family's reputation and the effect that widespread knowledge of his son's sickness with have on his future prospects. The Marquise and Clara discuss the past; the Marquise admits a secret that her father was a bankrupt, and that she married for money. She asks Clara if she should invest with Frederick to which Clara answers that it would make her happy, and the investment then proceeds. Clara seeks Dr Ellerby's advice on childhood trauma, without specifying the exact nature of her interest. Davison, Clara's maid, is also present and clearly uncomfortable with the encounter. Clara despatches Davison to James Trenchard with a letter and instructs her to await a reply before returning. The reply results in Clara visiting James, where they discuss Frederick's troubled childhood. James is open to an attempt to heal the breach but does not wish to make the first approach. The work at the new steel foundry proceeds, and a subsequent inspection by the Marquise goes well. Clara visits her mother and sister, mentioning her visit to James Trenchard, but not the reason for it. Her sister suggests a social arrangement between herself, Clara and the two brothers but is then confused by Clara's lack of enthusiasm. James visits the Trenchard house at Belgrave Square and is informed by Enright that Frederick is not at home, but it is Clara he has arrived to see. Frederick arrives home and in the ensuing confrontation angrily demands that James leaves the house. Frederick and Clara subsequently argue, and the household is left in disarray.
4	"Episode 4"	John Alexander & Paul Wilmshurst	Helen Edmundson & Sasha Hails	4 February 2024
Frederick and Clara discuss the incident: Frederick remains angry, but calm. The staff are instructed by Enright that the incident is never to be discussed with anyone outside the house. Clara receives a letter from James and meets him in Hyde Park: he apologises for his visit and begs that Frederick not be blamed. She presses James for more information about his father's death, he reveals that though their mother asked for him before her death, Frederick was not there either. Clara concludes that a secret is being kept. Frederick shows the foundry to the Duke of Rochester, who is suitably impressed. The Duke reveals that the Marquise has encouraged him into investing large sums in a Mexican silver mine, which Frederick was clearly unaware of. Frederick and Mr Ross later have words about the silver mine; Mr Ross knows nothing of it, Frederick is troubled. Nell visits the vicarage and meets James; they discuss the afterlife, but Nell again fails to reveal her personal connection to the discussion. Clara and Davison visit Dearden's exhibition after receiving an invitation by Dr Ellerby. She raises the same matter previously discussed, again without specifying the person who is the object of her concern. Nell demonstrates talent at the piano which leads Emily to question where she learned; Nell again fails to reveal anything about herself. Mr Fletcher visits a Molly house after work where he sees James Trenchard; Trenchard is later seen breaking down in tears upon his return home. Frederick visits the Marquise and gives an update on progress at the foundry, to her evident satisfaction. He suggests collaborating on any other opportunities that may arise, with the intention that the Marquise might mention the Mexican investment, but she will not be drawn. They are interrupted by fracas outside the door, a man angry that his contacts are investors in the Mexican silver mine from which he himself is apparently excluded. The Marquise apologises profusely to Frederick but explains nothing, and Frederick leaves even more concerned than he already was. Clara and Frederick argue again, the mystery of Frederick's childhood and family again coming between them, to Clara's increasing frustration. The Duchess finds the Duke reading Peter a bedtime story, and they reconcile. Clara and Davison visit Dr Ellerby and Dearden at the studio, where they meet Annie, the subject of one of the paintings they saw at the exhibition. Davison clearly disapproves of the bohemian lifestyle evident; Clara seems charmed by it, however, and opts to stay for dinner, breaking a former engagement with the Rochesters. This displeases Frederick, who reads Clara's diary and finds a child's drawing reminiscent of Frederick's unhappy childhood. At the studio, a clear flirtation develops between Clara and Dr Ellerby, to Davison's dismay. James Trenchard is shocked during one of his sermons to see a man he had previously met at the Molly House walk into the church and recognise him.
5	"Episode 5"	Marisol Adler	Helen Edmundson	18 February 2024
Frederick privately investigates the silver mine investment rumours; he and Clara are distant. James, to his despair, receives a blackmail letter from the man who had previously recognised him in church; he later meets the man to pay him off. Clara is fascinated by Dr Ellerby at a poetry reading, while Davison remains aloof from the gathering. Davison later confides in Fletcher her concerns. Mr Ross and Frederick discuss raising capital to invest the silver mine, though Frederick insists that the Marquise must approach him, not vice versa. He mentions it to Clara, who interprets this as a request to use her influence upon the Marquise. The Marquise unexpectedly visits Clara, during which conversation Clara mentions the silver mine; the Marquise expresses delight at Frederick's interest but changes the subject. Frederick is angered, it then transpires, that Clara has mentioned the silver mine to the Marquise; Clara is further frustrated at Frederick's apparently capricious expectations of her. Emily confides in James that she suspects Nell is educated, high-born and may secretly have a child. James refuses to indulge the speculation and remains committed to upholding Nell's confidence, then leaves. Emily later confronts Nell, who admits to a having had a child, Lily, who subsequently died of cold. Clara poses for Dearden as Aphrodite on condition that her likeness is sufficiently altered to avoid recognition, which Dr Ellerby also briefly witnesses. Davison is unable to contain her concerns and is reprimanded later by Clara for voicing them. Clara secretly offers to teach Mawdie, a housemaid, to read; Mawdie gratefully accepts. Frederick openly offers to invest in the silver mine, the Marquise claims that he was not offered the opportunity due to her knowing the foundry had stretched his resources, which he denies. She also advises Frederick to ignore Clara's more emotional behaviour. The Marquise throws a ball which is attended by Napoleon III and Princess Eugenie. The Marquise sows more mischief between Frederick and Clara, who argue as a consequence. Frederick discusses the silver mine with Mr Ross and decides, after all, to borrow to fund the investment, a course of action he previously refused to countenance. Clara visits Dr Ellerby and breaks down in tears at the prospect of losing her husband; Emily sees Dearden's new painting in a gallery window and recognises Clara, to her dismay.
6	"Episode 6"	Marisol Adler	Helen Edmundson	25 February 2024
Clara and Dr Ellerby now speak openly about Frederick. Emily questions Clara about the painting, who rejects the charge that she has done anything wrong. Emily perceives a coolness between Clara and Frederick. Clara and Davison discover that the painting has already been sold to a regular client of the gallery. James meets his blackmailer again, who has broken his previous promise not to demand more money. James refuses payment and is beaten; Fletcher however has followed them both and intervenes, displaying fighting ability and seeing the blackmailer off with violence. Fletcher helps a grateful James to the vicarage and later explains his own injuries to Davison, revealing that he had learned to defend himself following the incident in his past to which Davison had been witness. He also reveals that James was the man he had helped, and the circumstances in question. Mr Ross brings the loan documents to Frederick. The loan is to be secured against both the foundry and the import/export business; Mr Ross also declares a desire to invest some of his own savings in the silver mine, which Frederick states to be a conflict of interest, but does not immediately reject. James is discovered, bloodied and barely conscious, on the floor the next morning by his distraught housekeeper, whom he refuses to allow to call a doctor. Clara relates her worries over the painting to the Marquise, who dismisses any reason for concern. Mawdie's reading lessons with Clara proceed, with Mawdie showing intelligence but little confidence in herself. Clara makes a gift of an expensive dress to Mawdie, which surprises Davison. Emily and Nell finally discuss her past; she was thrown out of the house by her strict father when her pregnancy became obvious. She had then come to London to search for the father, but without success. Fredrick conveys an invitation to lunch with the Rochesters to Clara who refuses to join him there, which angers him. Mr Ross and Frederick present a cheque to the Marquise which is rejected; she insists on a bankers draft which the pair commit to producing forthwith, though Mr Ross remarks on the fact that such a demand is unusual. Emily tries to see James, but his housekeeper refuses entry, saying James has a severe cold. Mr Ross gossips with Mrs Enright about her past in service in France; he asks her to find out if her contacts there know anything about the Marquise D'Étagnac, saying that although her knowledge and business acumen is impressive, he is starting to have doubts. The Rochesters ask after Clara at lunch, at which her absence embarrasses Frederick. He relates his pain over the loss of Clara's affections to the Duchess, who is sympathetic and distressed on his behalf. She later discusses it with the Duke, admitting to a sense of guilt. Clara meets with Dr Ellerby and co at the studio again, discussing political activism; Dearden apologises for the concern over the painting's display in a gallery, but assures Clara that the painting is now in a private collection. Frederick returns to Clara's continued absence and questions Davison as to her whereabouts. James is missed at the following Sunday's service. Emily is invited into the vicarage by the now-deeply-concerned housekeeper. James begs Emily to leave him alone, but she refuses. A doctor later reveals to Emily that James insistence on privacy should have been ignored: he has three broken ribs and a collapsed lung. Emily continues to care for James, expressing her growing affections. It is revealed that the Marquise has acquired the painting of Aphrodite from the private buyers; she shows it to Clara, who is gratified and hopes it can be destroyed but the Marquise refuses, saying instead that it will be kept hidden; Clara is reassured. Mrs Enright's brother in France returns information; she relates to Mr Ross that the Chateau Étagnac is a ruin and has been so for decades. Clara and Dr Ellerby meet again on the heath where he is looking after Peter; he professes his love for her, but is interrupted by Peter having an epileptic seizure, witnessed by unsympathetic members of the public. The Duke is incensed that this was allowed to occur, bars Dr Ellerby from the house, and reverses his previous gradually-softening position on how Peter should be treated. The Duchess hears from her other children who were also present, that Dr Ellerby had been in Clara's company at the time, which concerns her. Mr Ross meets, Mr Keck, one of his contacts who worked in France for 8 years previously. They discuss the Marquise, Mr Ross expressing his growing doubts, and he suggests Keck going back to Paris to find out more. Mawdie has gone out with a footman in her new dress, they are now in his room in the servants quarters. Mawdie reveals her theory that Mr Enright is having an affair behind his wife's back on the basis that he regularly writes to a woman in France; Enright is presumably unaware that Mawdie can read and therefore knows the destination of the letters. Frederick refuses to see Emily Dunn when Enright attempts to announce her, but she bursts into the room anyway and informs him of James' condition and that he wishes to see Frederick. Frederick attempts to refuse but Emily insists and he agrees. When they meet, James tells him what his mother, Susan, had wanted to tell him on her deathbed: Frederick was not Oliver's son as everyone had always believed, and that this fact, known only to Oliver and Susan, explains Oliver's hostility to Frederick as a child. Frederick is moved, yet still refuses James' attempt to restore the affections James desires, leaving the house in anger.
7	"Episode 7"	Roger Goldby	Helen Edmundson	3 March 2024
Mr Keck is seen visiting Étagnac in France. Frederick recalls Oliver's death. He also researches the Trenchard business under his grandfather, discovering that it was able to grow rapidly through significant leverage, and asserts to Mr Ross that he wishes now to operate the same way. He rejects borrowing against his own home but wants any remaining collateral in both businesses to be made available for further borrowing. Dr Ellerby and the Duchess discuss Peter, and that the Duke has now decided to send Peter away to Switzerland permanently. Dr Ellerby instead suggests Peter being adopted by his childless friends Dr and Mrs Carey; the Duchess refuses. She asks to know why Clara was in Ellerby's company on the heath; he claims that Clara is also his patient. The Duchess expresses reservations about this. Clara, alerted to James' condition by her mother, attempts to discuss the matter with Frederick who again refuses to discuss it. Discussing it with Davison afterwards, Davison reveals her knowledge that James is homosexual without revealing how she supposes this to be true. Emily asks Nell to talk to James, whose despair defeats her attempts to help. Nell's own experiences enable her to encourage him. Clara attempts to explain to Ellerby that they must stop seeing each other; he promises to sacrifice all if she will leave Frederick, but she refuses. Mrs Enright finds Mawdie's footman stealing and insists he give notice; he saves himself by relating Mawdie's story about the letters. Mrs Enright intercepts the next letter. Mr Keck returns from France, having discovered that years ago a peasant's daughter had married a penniless aristocrat of the d'Étagnac line, and successfully arranged bank loans on the strength of the family name. This had then turned into a career based on fraud and blackmail, with multiple legal cases outstanding in France, but many also having been settled under suspicious circumstances. The Marquise, meanwhile, sows gossip about Clara in society under the guise of sincere concern. At a later meeting between Mr Ross and the Marquise, he challenges her in frank and disrespectful terms, but then reveals his true intent: he wants half the Trenchard investment into the silver mine, in cash, in return for his silence. The Duchess reveals her concerns about Clara to the Dunn's, but Mrs Dunn angrily rejects the implication that Clara is to blame for anything. Emily later argues with Clara on the subject, saying that Clara's behaviour threatens her own prospects with James. Clara breaks down in sorrow, but tries to warn Emily off James without disclosing Davison's confidences; Emily reacts angrily and then reveals to Clara the truth about Frederick's parents. Mr Ross is seen removing legal documents from Frederick's desk. He speaks with Mrs Enright who reveals the letter; it appears to be a regular report upon Lord Trenchard to an address in France, the significance of which Ross immediately perceives. Mrs Enright intends to confront her husband however Ross dissuades her, disclosing part of his own plans; she gives him the letter. Ross is pursued by the Marquise's conspirators; he realises the danger he is now in. The Duchess reveals her concerns to Frederick, while James recuperates with Emily's help. He later confronts Clara who denies any infidelity and reveals her knowledge of his birth; they angrily part and Clara plans to leave London, Davison goes with her. Nell visits Dr Ellerby, who recognises her, but Clara then discovers them together; he admits that he was the father of her child but that he had no knowledge of it. Clara, distressed at the revelation, leaves. Clara and Davison plan their next move, realising their limited options; Clara suggests approaching Mr Ross for help. He suggests they join him on his trip to Hull at 5pm; they are of course unaware of his real plans, and agree. Frederick discovers Ross's betrayal and that of Mr Enright. He then visits the Marquise's residence only to discover the house abandoned. While there he finds the painting of Aphrodite, recognising his wife's likeness. He visits the Duke of Rochester and reveals truth; the Duke is regretful yet composed at what he perceives to be a manageable loss. He also reveals that he had been privately warned of rumours in Paris about the Marquise by Nathaniel Rothschilde, a fact he had kept to himself. Frederick does not reveal that his own losses are considerably greater. Frederick confronts Enright and sacks him in the belief that the letters were written to the Marquise; Enright tries to explain but panics and is unable to defend himself. Frederick then discovers to his shock that Clara has left him. Ross, Clara and Davison stay at a boarding house arranged by Ross; he attempts to seduce Clara who resists, then Davison intervenes, striking Ross over the head with a candlestick. They both pack and leave hurriedly. Ross attempts to follow but is discovered by the Marquise's henchman, who flashes a blade then closes in on Ross.
8	"Episode 8"	Roger Goldby	Helen Edmundson	10 March 2024
Enright is revealed to have met John Bellasis in Calais in 1846, who reveals that he has a son but that he is unable to ever see him. Enright then meets James and reveals Frederick's true parentage to him; James had only known that Oliver was not Frederick's father, but not who the real father was. James was aware, though, that John had attempted to kill Viscount Bellasis, cousin to James and Frederick. Enright reveals that he was paid annually by John to keep an eye on Frederick, and that he achieved this by joining the Trenchard household as staff. Enright had never received replies to his regular updates until just recently, in a letter he now shares with James. They approach Frederick, who has been thrown into deep depression following Clara's leaving him: he refuses at first but relents, and James shows him the letter from France. It reveals that John Bellasis is dying, and now begs to see Frederick. All three proceed to travel to France, where they meet John, who describes his affair in 1841 with Frederick's mother. Frederick asks why John wants to see him, to which John explains that he wants Frederick to know that he, Frederick, is the only thing in John's life that he can be proud of. John relates that he knew Frederick had not been cherished by Oliver, and his regret and sorrow at the pain this must have caused. James later admits that he saw his mother with a groundsman; Frederick relates a similar experience, leading to the conclusion that their mother's serial infidelity probably explains James's birth. The next day Fredrick returns to see his father again but it is too late: he has died the previous night. Clara and Davison are seen working as waitresses in a restaurant. Clara confides in Davison that she understands Frederick's pain. At a later date, The Duchess meets Frederick, who reveals that he has lost a great deal of money to the Marquise but not quite everything: he is selling his home in Eaton Square. The Duchess later discovers in conversation with the Duke that the Duke received private intelligence about the Marquise and not shared the information: she is outraged and they then fight about Peter's fate. Frederick has still no knowledge of Clara's whereabouts. Clara pines for her family and decides eventually to reunite with them. They give her news of Frederick's financial difficulties but she will not see him. Emily apologises to Clara, accepting that it was the Marquise, not Clara, who was the source of the rumours, and relates that Dr Ellerby and Nell are now married. Emily gives to Clara letters that Frederick has written, which she reads. They meet Nell at the graveyard where her daughter is buried, where they discuss Dr Ellerby's intrigue with Clara, and Nell's forgiveness for his history with herself. The Duke reconsiders the Carey's offer to take Peter in, and the family reconciles. Clara and James meet and he begs her to see Frederick, who James says has changed, including having given money to the church. Clara says she still loves him but believes them better apart. Frederick meets the Dunns at the Christmas service led by James, where it is also revealed that the brothers' affections are restored. James invites Frederick to a Christmas gathering of friends that evening but Frederick declines. Frederick and Clara later reunite: Enright has admitted her to the house without telling Frederick. He apologises for the past and begs her forgiveness: they reconcile. The household, including Enright and Fletcher, later join the Christmas gathering at the vicarage, where Frederick and Clara reveal they will live at Glanville from now on.

== Production ==
=== Development ===
An original spin-off of Julian Fellowes' 2020 limited series Belgravia was announced in September 2022. The eight-part series was developed and written by Helen Edmundson, with Carnival Films producing. Edmundson and Fellowes served as executive producers alongside Gareth Neame, Nigel Marchant and Joanna Strevens. Directors included John Alexander, Paul Wilmshurst, and Marisol Adler.

=== Casting ===
In March 2023, it was announced Harriet Slater would lead the series alongside Ben Wainwright and Edward Bluemel. Also joining the cast were Toby Regbo, Hannah Onslow, Sophie Thompson, Claude Perron, Sophie Winkleman, and Elaine Cassidy.

=== Filming ===
Principal photography began in February 2023. Filming locations included London, the Home Counties, and Edinburgh.
