= Marit Velle Kile =

Norwegian actress (born 1978)

- Born: 14 November 1978 (age 47); Ørsta Municipality, Norway
- Other names: Marit V. Kile; Marit V Kile; Marit Kile
- Occupations: Actress, singer
- Years active: 2002–2006

Marit Velle Kile (born 14 November 1978) is a Norwegian former actress appearing in film and television. Kile's most recent appearance was on the TV series Blue Murder playing the role of Marta.

== Filmography ==
| Year | Title | Role | Notes |
|---|---|---|---|
| 2002 | Blade II | Verlaine | Director: Guillermo del Toro |
| 2003 | The Eustace Bros. | Olga | TV series 1 episode |
| 2003 | Doctors | Anna | TV series 1 episode |
| 2004 | She's Gone | Elena Ekstrom | Television |
| 2004 | Blue Murder | Marta | TV series 1 episode |
| 2004 | NY-LON | Kristin | TV series 2 episodes |
| 2005 | The Girl in the Café | Waitress | Television |
| 2006 | The Best Man | Silje | Television |
