= Fast Freddie, The Widow and Me =

- Genre: Drama
- Written by: Christopher Dunlop
- Directed by: David Richards
- Starring: Laurence Fox; Jack McMullen; Sarah Smart; Marian McLoughlin; Tamzin Outhwaite; David Westhead; Faye Daveney; Judy Flynn; Bill Paterson
- Country of origin: United Kingdom
- Original language: English
- No. of episodes: 1

Production
- Executive producer: Margaret Enefer
- Producer: Madonna Baptise
- Running time: 90 minutes
- Production company: STV Studios

Original release
- Network: ITV
- Release: 27 December 2011

Fast Freddie, The Widow and Me is a 2011 one-off Christmas television special, made by STV Studios and broadcast by ITV on Tuesday 27 December 2011. The story centres on a wealthy car dealer who befriends a terminally ill teenager and makes his Christmas wish come true.

== Plot ==
Jonathan Donald (Laurence Fox) is a wealthy car dealer who, having been convicted of drink driving, is sentenced to 60 hours of community service at The Moonbeam Club for young adults who have social and behavioural difficulties.

At the club, Jonathan meets recently widowed Laura Cooper (Sarah Smart) but Laura doesn't like Jonathan's attitude towards the club and soon tells him to leave. Having failed to meet the terms of his sentence, Jonathan is forced to return by the court, with the sentence extended to 100 hours, and soon befriends 19-year-old Freddie Copeland (Jack McMullen), a gadget expert at the club. Jonathan learns that Freddie is dying of kidney failure and a genetic heart condition and that this Christmas could be his last. Freddie wishes for a family Christmas so Jonathan sets up a plan to help him, much to Laura's despair. Jonathan tracks down Freddie's real mother but she refuses to accept that she is Freddie's mother so Jonathan alters his plan and, with the help of Jonathan's best friend Charlie, Laura's mother Julia and some criminals led by fraudster Patsy Morgan (Tamzin Outhwaite), Jonathan makes Freddie's wish come true. Freddie dies in hospital after Christmas so Laura, Jonathan and The Moonbeam Club put his ashes into fireworks and set them off on 12 April as Freddie's last wish comes true.

== Cast ==
- Laurence Fox as Jonathan Donald
- Jack McMullen as Freddie Copeland
- Sarah Smart as Laura Cooper
- Tamzin Outhwaite as Patsy Morgan
- David Westhead as Charlie
- Marian McLoughlin as Julia
- Davood Ghadami as Alex
- Vahid Gold as Mark
- Faye Daveney as Natasha
- Calvin Demba as Terry
- Larrisa Toussiant-Grant as Kate
- Judy Flynn as Cathy
- Debra Baker as Susie Copeland
- Ann Beach as Grandma
- Reece Beaumont as Peter
- Bill Paterson as Judge Underwood
- Ruth Kearney as Stacey
