= Ray Winstone =

English actor (born 1957)

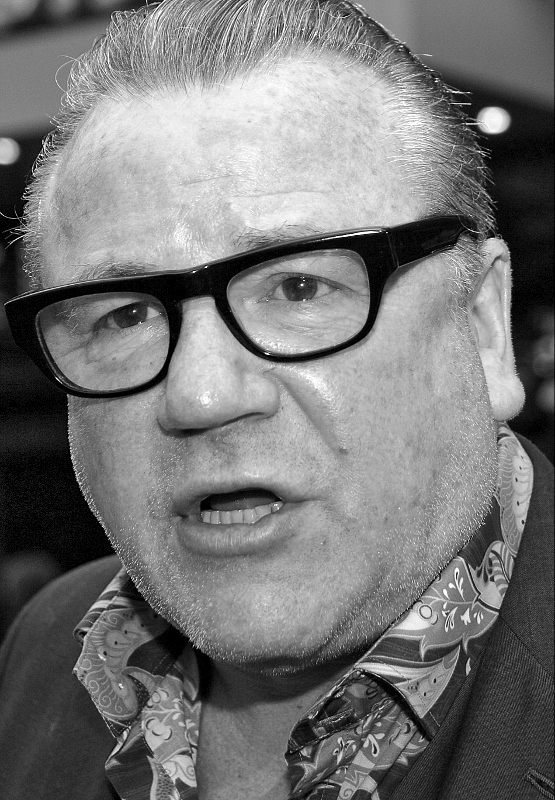
- Winstone in 2014
- Born: Raymond Andrew Winstone; 19 February 1957 (age 69); Homerton, London, England
- Occupation: Actor
- Years active: 1976–present
- Spouse: Elaine McCausland (m. 1979)
- Children: 3, including Lois and Jaime

Raymond Andrew Winstone (/ˈwɪnstən/; born 19 February 1957) is an English actor. With a career spanning five decades, he is known for his "hard man" roles, usually delivered in his distinctive London accent.

Besides playing gangster roles, Winstone has also worked in comedy (Martha, Meet Frank, Daniel and Laurence) and as the romantic lead (Fanny and Elvis). He starred as Henry VIII in the 2003 TV serial of the same name. He has appeared in many TV shows, including Robin of Sherwood (1984 to 1986), The Bill, Boon, Ever Decreasing Circles, One Foot in the Grave, Home To Roost, Birds of a Feather, Kavanagh QC, and Auf Wiedersehen, Pet.

Winstone received a BAFTA Award for Best Actor in a Leading Role nomination for his performance in Nil by Mouth (1997). He also starred in the British independent films Scum (1979), Quadrophenia (1979), The War Zone (1999), Last Orders (2001), and Sex & Drugs & Rock & Roll (2010). Winstone's other notable films include Sexy Beast (2000), Ripley's Game (2002), Cold Mountain (2003), King Arthur (2004), The Departed (2006), Beowulf (2007), Indiana Jones and the Kingdom of the Crystal Skull (2008), Hugo (2011), Snow White and the Huntsman (2012), Black Widow (2021), and Damsel (2024).

== Early life and education ==
Winstone was born on 19 February 1957 in Hackney Hospital, London. He first lived in Caistor Park Road, Stratford E15, and attended Portway infants and junior school. He moved to Enfield when he was seven. His mother, Margaret (née Richardson; 1932–1985) had a job emptying fruit machines, and his father, Raymond J. Winstone (1933–2015), ran a fruit-and-vegetable business.

Winstone has recounted how, as a child, he used to play with his friends on bomb sites (empty plots of land with rubble from Second World War bombs). He joined Brimsdown Primary School and in 1968, enrolled to Edmonton County School, which had changed from a grammar school to a comprehensive upon his arrival. He also attended Corona Theatre School. He did not take to school, eventually leaving with a single CSE (grade 2) in drama.

He recounted an early encounter with a notorious gangster:

I was still a baby the day Ronnie Kray came round to see Dad, but I've been told this story so many times I can see it unfolding in my mind. Everyone was on their best behaviour, but then Ronnie picked me up, and by all accounts I pissed all over him. He had a new mac on, which had probably cost a few bob, and I absolutely covered it. The room fell silent, then Ronnie cracked up, so everyone knew it was safe to join in.

Winstone had an early affinity for acting; his father would take him to the cinema every Wednesday afternoon. Later, he viewed Albert Finney in Saturday Night and Sunday Morning, and said: "I thought, 'I could be that geezer'." His other major influences included John Wayne, James Cagney, and Edward G. Robinson. After borrowing extra tuition money from a friend's mother, a drama teacher, Winstone took to the stage, appearing as a Cockney newspaper seller in a production of Emil and the Detectives.

Winstone was also a boxer. Known to his friends as Winnie, he was called Little Sugs at home (his father already being known as Sugar, after Sugar Ray Robinson). At the age of 12, Winstone joined the Repton Amateur Boxing Club. Over the next 10 years, he won 80 out of 88 bouts. He was London schoolboy champion at welterweight on three occasions, and fought twice for England. The experience gave him a perspective on his later career: "If you can get in a ring with 2,000 people watching and be smacked around by another guy, then walking onstage isn't hard."

Deciding to pursue drama, Winstone enrolled at the Corona Stage Academy in Hammersmith, aged about 17. At £900 a term, it was expensive considering the average wage was then about £36 a week. He was expelled for vandalising the head's car.

== Career ==
=== 1970–1988 ===
In 1975, Winstone landed his first professional role in What a Crazy World at the Theatre Royal, Stratford in London. One of his first TV appearances came in the 1976 "Loving Arms" episode of the popular police series The Sweeney, where he was credited as "Raymond Winstone" (as he was in What a Crazy World) and played a minor part as an unnamed young thug.

Winstone auditioned for Alan Clarke's BBC play Scum (1979). Because Clarke liked Winstone's cocky, aggressive boxer's walk, he got the part, though it had been written for a Glaswegian. The play, written by Roy Minton and directed by Clarke, was a brutal depiction of a young offender's institution. Winstone was cast in the leading role of Carlin, a young offender who struggles against both his captors and his fellow cons to become the "Daddy" of the institution. Hard hitting and often violent, the play was judged unsuitable for broadcast by the BBC, and was not shown until 1991. The banned television play was entirely refilmed in 1979 for cinematic release with many of the original actors playing the same roles, including Winstone. In a commentary for the Scum DVD, Winstone cites Clarke as a major influence on his career and laments the director's death in 1990 from cancer.

After a short run in the TV series Fox (1980), he scored a role in Ladies and Gentlemen, The Fabulous Stains (1982), alongside Diane Lane and Laura Dern. He then starred in the opening episode of the third season of Bergerac (1983), and as Will Scarlet in Robin of Sherwood. He again teamed up with Jason Connery in a film Tank Malling (1984), which also featured Amanda Donohoe and Maria Whittaker.

=== 1990–2003 ===
Winstone was asked to appear in Mr Thomas, a play written by his friend and fellow Londoner Kathy Burke. The reviews were good, and led to Winstone being cast, alongside Burke, in Gary Oldman's drama Nil By Mouth (1997). He was widely lauded for his performance as an alcoholic wife-batterer, receiving a BAFTA nomination (17 years after his Best Newcomer award for That Summer). He continued to play "tough guy" roles in Face and The War Zone – the latter especially controversial, as he played a man who rapes his own daughter – but that obvious toughness also allowed him to play loved-up nice-guys in romantic comedies Fanny and Elvis and There's Only One Jimmy Grimble. In Last Christmas, he played a dead man, now a trainee angel, who returns from heaven to help his young son cope with his bereavement which was written by Tony Grounds. In 1995, he played the sinister and mysterious Thane in the comedy drama series The Ghostbusters of East Finchley. The series was also written by Grounds, with whom Winstone worked again on Births, Marriages & Deaths and Our Boy, the latter winning him the Royal Television Society Best Actor Award. They worked together again in 2006 on All in the Game where Winstone portrayed a football manager. He did a series of Holsten Pils advertisements where he played upon the phrase "Who's the Daddy", coined in the film Scum.

In 2000, Winstone starred alongside Jude Law in Love, Honour and Obey. He then played lead role in Sexy Beast (2001), which earned him great acclaim from UK and international audiences and brought him to the attention of the American film industry. Winstone plays "Gal" Dove, a retired and happily married former thief dragged back into London's underworld by a psychopathic former associate (Ben Kingsley, who received an Oscar nomination for his performance). In 2000, he starred in To the Green Fields Beyond at the Donmar Warehouse and directed by Sam Mendes. In 2002, he performed at the Royal Court as Griffin in The Night Heron. Two years later, he joined Kevin Spacey for 24 Hour Plays at the Old Vic, a series of productions that were written, rehearsed, and performed in a single day.

After a brief role alongside Burke again in the tragi-comic The Martins (2001), he appeared in Last Orders (2001), where he starred alongside Michael Caine, Helen Mirren, David Hemmings, and Tom Courtenay. Next, Winstone got a prime part in Ripley's Game (2002), the semisequel to The Talented Mr. Ripley, in which he once again played a gangster. He followed up with Lenny Blue, the sequel to Tough Love, and the short "The Bouncer". Now internationally known, Winstone was next chosen by Anthony Minghella to play Teague, a sinister Home Guard boss in the American Civil War drama Cold Mountain (2003).

According to actor Dominic West, Ray Winstone was the original choice to play the role of "Jimmy McNulty" in the HBO series The Wire (2002). West stated Winstone turned down the role because he did not want to live in Baltimore, Maryland, and the role subsequently went to West.

=== 2004–2012 ===
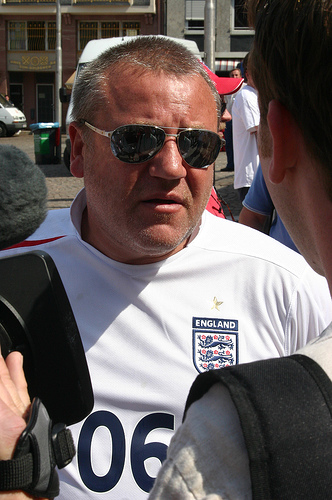
Winstone in 2006

At this time, Winstone set up Size 9 and Flicks production companies with his longtime agent Michael Wiggs. The first effort was She's Gone, in which he plays a businessman whose young daughter disappears in Istanbul (filming was held up by unrest in the Middle East). He followed it up with Jerusalem, in which he played poet and visionary William Blake. Winstone made his action-film debut in King Arthur (2004), starring Clive Owen, directed by Antoine Fuqua, and produced by Jerry Bruckheimer. Fuqua lauded his performance, proclaiming he was "the British De Niro". Winstone provided the voice of Soldier Sam in the screen version of The Magic Roundabout. In 2005, he appeared opposite Suranne Jones in ITV drama Vincent about a team of private detectives. He returned to the role in 2006 and was awarded an International Emmy. He also portrayed a 19th-century English policeman trying to tame the Australian outback in The Proposition. In 2006, American critic Roger Ebert described Winstone as "one of the best actors now at work in movies".

A complete change of pace for Winstone occurred when he provided the voice for the cheeky-chappy Mr. Beaver in The Chronicles of Narnia: The Lion, the Witch and the Wardrobe, also in 2005. Winstone appeared in Martin Scorsese's 2006 film The Departed as Mr. French, an enforcer to Jack Nicholson's Irish mob boss. Critic Roger Ebert singled out Winstone for praise among the ensemble cast of The Departed, writing that the actor "invests every line with the authority of God dictating to Moses". He provided motion capture movements and voice-over work for the title character in the Robert Zemeckis' film Beowulf. He then co-starred in Indiana Jones and the Kingdom of the Crystal Skull, which was released on 22 May 2008. He returned to television drama in The Changeling-inspired Compulsion, originally shown in May 2009. Since 2009, Winstone has fronted the advertising for betting firm Bet365. He also co-founded a sports-management business, Integral Sports Management, in 2020.

Winstone has mixed work in Hollywood productions with work in lower-budget, independent films. In 2010, Winstone starred as Arjan van Diemen in the film Tracker with Temuera Morrison He had a role as CIA agent Darius Jedburgh in the Edge of Darkness remake, replacing Robert De Niro. Winstone starred in British independent film The Hot Potato in 2011, and the following year in a big-screen remake of popular 1970s show The Sweeney (2012).

=== 2013–present ===
In April 2013, while a guest host of the comedy quiz show Have I Got News for You, he provoked controversy by stating that Scotland's chief exports were "oil, whisky, tartan, and tramps", leading to a headline in The Scotsman claiming, "Ray Winstone calls Scots 'tramps' on TV quiz show". Viewers complained to Ofcom and the BBC. In 2015, he played the role of ex-criminal Jimmy Rose in The Trials of Jimmy Rose, a three-part drama for ITV. In 2006, Winstone appeared as the Star in a Reasonably Priced Car during series 8 of BBC's Top Gear.

In 2015, he starred in The Gunman with Sean Penn; the film was a box-office failure. That same year, Winstone also featured in remake Point Break, a relative box-office success, though critically panned. In 2017, the actor starred in the critically acclaimed British independent film Jawbone, before 2018's critical and box-office failure King of Thieves. In 2019, Winstone starred in critical disaster The Queen's Corgi, and critical and box-office bomb Cats. Winstone then starred in Marvel's Black Widow in 2021. He appeared as career criminal Bobby Glass in Guy Ritchie's eight-part series The Gentlemen, which debuted on Netflix in March 2024. In 2025, Winstone was honoured with Honorary Heart of Sarajevo Award at the 31st Sarajevo Film Festival.

== Personal life ==
Winstone met his wife, Elaine McCausland, while filming That Summer in 1979. They have three daughters; the elder two, Lois and Jaime, are actresses. Winstone lives with his wife in Roydon, Essex. He is a fan of West Ham United and promoted their 2009 home kit. Winstone was declared bankrupt on 4 October 1988, and again on 19 March 1993.

In 2019, in the context of Brexit, Winstone expressed a preference for leaving the European Union without a deal and argued against holding a second referendum, stating that it would lead to "rebellion" and that "the country voted to leave. Then that's democracy, you leave."

== Filmography ==
=== Film ===
Year	Title	Role	Notes
1979	That Summer!	Steve Brodie	
1979	Scum	Carlin	
1979	Quadrophenia	Kevin Herriot	
1981	Ladies and Gentlemen, The Fabulous Stains	Billy	
1989	Tank Malling	John "Tank" Malling	
1994	Ladybird, Ladybird	Simon	
1997	Nil by Mouth	Ray	
1997	Face	Dave	
1998	Martha, Meet Frank, Daniel and Laurence	Pederesen	
1998	Final Cut	Ray	
1998	Brand New World	Colonel	
1999	Darkness Falls	John Barrett	
1999	The War Zone	Dad	
2000	There's Only One Jimmy Grimble	Harry	
2000	Sexy Beast	Gary "Gal" Dove	
2000	Love, Honour and Obey	Ray Kreed	
2001	Last Orders	Vince Dodds	
2001	The Martins	Mr. Marvel	
2002	Ripley's Game	Reeves	
2003	Cold Mountain	Teague	
2004	Everything	Richard	
2004	King Arthur	Bors	
2005	The Proposition	Captain Stanley	
2005	The Magic Roundabout	Soldier Sam	Voice role
2005	The Chronicles of Narnia: The Lion, the Witch and the Wardrobe	Mr. Beaver	Voice role
2006	The Departed	Arnold "Frenchie" French	
2006	Breaking and Entering	Bruno Fella	
2007	Beowulf	Beowulf / Dragon	Voice; motion capture
2008	Fool's Gold	Moe Fitch	
2008	Indiana Jones and the Kingdom of the Crystal Skull	George "Mac" McHale	
2008	Compulsion	Don Flowers	
2009	The Devil's Tomb	Blakely	Direct-to-Video
2009	44 Inch Chest	Colin Diamond	
2009	Fathers of Girls	Frank Horner	
2010	Sex & Drugs & Rock & Roll	William Dury	
2010	Percy Jackson & the Olympians: The Lightning Thief	Ares	Uncredited
2010	Edge of Darkness	Captain Darius Jedburgh	
2010	13	Ronald Lynn Bagges	
2010	London Boulevard	Rob Gant	
2010	Tracker	Arjan Van Diemen	
2011	Rango	Bad Bill	Voice role
2011	Hugo	Uncle Claude	
2011	The Hot Potato	Kenny Smith	
2012	Elfie Hopkins	Butcher Bryn	
2012	Snow White and the Huntsman	Gort	
2012	The Sweeney	Jack Regan	
2012	Ashes	Frank	
2014	Noah	Tubal-cain	
2015	The Gunman	Stanley Edgerton	
2015	The Legend of Barney Thomson	Holdall	
2015	Point Break	FBI Agent Angelo Pappas	
2015	Zipper	Nigel Coaker	
2017	Jawbone	William Carney	
2018	King of Thieves	Danny Jones	
2019	The Queen's Corgi	Tyson	Voice role
2019	Cats	Growltiger	
2021	(K)nox: The Rob Knox Story	Himself	Interviewee
2021	Black Widow	General Dreykov	
2022	Prizefighter: The Life of Jem Belcher	Bill Warr	
2022	Puss in Boots: The Last Wish	Papa Bear	Voice role
2024	Damsel	Lord Bayford	
2027	Going Under	Riley	Post-production
TBA	Yeti		Filming

=== Television ===
Year	Title	Role	Notes
1976	The Sweeney	2nd Youth	1 episode
1977	Scum	Carlin	Unscreened Play for Today
1980	Fox	Kenny Fox	13 episodes
1983	Auf Wiedersehen, Pet	Colin	1 episode
1983	Bergerac	Tully	1 episode
1984	Fairly Secret Army	Stubby Collins	3 episodes
1984–1986	Robin of Sherwood	Will Scarlet	Main role, 24 episodes
1984–1989	Minder	Arnie	4 episodes
1986	C.A.T.S. Eyes	Geoff	1 episode
1986	Ever Decreasing Circles	Harold	1 episode
1987	Boon	Billy	1 episode
1987	Father Matthew's Daughter	Father Charlie	6 episodes
1987	Pulaski	DS Ford	2 episodes
1990	Birds of a Feather	Malcolm / Prison Warder	2 episodes
1990	Home to Roost	Bill Bateman	1 episode
1991	Palmer	Eddie Palmer	Television film
1992	Between the Lines	Sergeant Godley	1 episode
1992–1993	Get Back	Martin Sweet	Main role, 15 episodes
1994	Murder Most Horrid	Terry	1 episode
1995	The Ghostbusters of East Finchley	Thane	6 episodes
1995	Kavanagh QC	CPO Evans	1 episode
1996	One Foot in the Grave	Vagrant / Millichope	1 episode
1999	Births, Marriages and Deaths	Alan	Miniseries, 4 episodes
1999	Last Christmas	Neville	TV movie
2000–2002	Lenny Blue	DC Lenny Milton	Main role, 4 episodes
2002	At Home with the Braithwaites	Steve Searle	1 episode
2003	Henry VIII	King Henry VIII	2 episodes
2004	She's Gone	Harry Sands	Television film
2005–2006	Vincent	Vincent Gallagher	Main role, 8 episodes
2006	All in the Game	Frankie	Television film
2006	Sweeney Todd	Sweeney Todd	Television film
2010	Ben Hur	Quintus Arrius	Miniseries, 2 episodes
2011	Great Expectations	Abel Magwitch	Miniseries, 3 episodes
2013	Moonfleet	Elzevir Block	Miniseries, 2 episodes
2015	The Trials of Jimmy Rose	Jimmy Rose	Main role, 3 episodes
2016	The Nightmare Worlds of H.G. Wells	H.G. Wells	Introducer and narrator, 4 episodes
2016	Of Kings and Prophets	Saul	Main role, 9 episodes
2016–2018	Ice	Cam Rose	Main role, 20 episodes
2020	Ray Winstone in Sicily	Himself	Travel mini-series
2024–present	The Gentlemen	Bobby Glass	12 episodes
2022–present	West Ham United F.C.	West Ham Legend	Voice at Stadium

=== Video games ===
Year	Title	Role	Notes
2007	Beowulf: The Game	Beowulf	
2011	Killzone 3	Admiral Orlock	Also motion capture performance

== Awards and nominations ==
Year	Association	Category	Project	Notes
1979	BAFTA Award	Best Newcomer	That Summer	Nominated
1997	BAFTA Award	Best Actor in a Leading Role	Nil by Mouth	Nominated
1997	British Independent Film Award	Best Actor	Nil by Mouth	Nominated
1999	British Independent Film Award	Best Actor	The War Zone	Nominated
1999	European Film Award	Best Actor	The War Zone	Nominated
2001	British Independent Film Award	Best Actor	Last Orders	Nominated
2005	San Diego Film Critics Society	Best Supporting Actor	The Proposition	Won
2006	Screen Actors Guild Award	Outstanding Cast in a Motion Picture	The Departed	Nominated

== See also ==
- List of British actors
- List of International Emmy Award winners
