= Stephen Butchard =

British screenwriter

- Occupations: Screenwriter, television producer
- Known for: The Last Kingdom; Vincent; Good Cop; This City is Ours

Stephen Butchard is a British screenwriter and television producer, best known for adapting Bernard Cornwell's The Saxon Stories into the BBC/Netflix drama series The Last Kingdom.

== Early life ==
Butchard was born in Liverpool. He trained as an engineer and spent a year in Beijing, China (September 1993 to October 1994), working on the Beijing underground rail network.

== Career ==
Butchard began writing plays while working as an engineer. In 1997, he won the Dennis Potter Award for '‘Soft Sand, Blue Sea’', which secured him representation. During the 2000s, he wrote several television films and series such as Always and Everyone, House of Saddam and Vincent. In 2010, BBC One would broadcast his mini-series Five Daughters, starring Ian Hart and Sarah Lancashire. Set in 2006, it is about the Ipswich serial murders. Butchard said about the project. "Our hope is that this drama provides a glimpse of the real girls their families knew, and also leads to further debate on the impact of drugs and sex industries upon every town, every city in this country... and what action is, or isn't, being taken."

In 2012, Butchard wrote the cop drama Good Cop, following a constable whose partner is murdered. Following the shooting of two police officers in Tameside, Greater Manchester, on 18 September, the BBC postponed the final episode, originally scheduled for Thursday 20 September. It would air later, on Saturday 13 October 2012. Butchard adapted and showran the first three series of The Last Kingdom, which saw a transition from BBC Two to Netflix as distributor for the third series. In 2020, Channel 4 and Hulu broadcast his thriller Baghdad Central.

In 2023, Butchard adapted The Good Mothers, a non-fiction book by British author Alex Perry on the Calabrian 'Ndrangheta mafia, into a television series for Disney+. The series had its international premiere at 73rd Berlin International Film Festival in Berlinale Series on 21 February 2023, and won the Berlinale Series Award. In 2024, Disney+ streamed Butchard's adaptation of the Shardlake series of historical mystery novels by C. J. Sansom.

In 2025, BBC One broadcast Butchard's crime drama This City Is Ours and factual drama series Prisoner 951 about the imprisonment of Nazanin Zaghari-Ratcliffe.
