= She's Gone (film) =

2004 British television film

- DVD cover
- Genre: Crime drama Thriller
- Created by: Simon Tyrell
- Starring: Ray Winstone; Lindsey Coulson; Gary Lucy; Emily Corrie; Rebecca Clarke; Haluk Bilginer; David Westhead
- Country of origin: United Kingdom
- Original language: English

Production
- Executive producers: Michael Wiggs; Ray Winstone
- Producer: Joshua St. Johnston
- Running time: 120 mins.

Original release
- Network: ITV
- Release: 19 September 2004

She's Gone was a one-off British crime drama film on ITV on 19 September 2004, starring Ray Winstone as the protagonist, Harry Sands, who flies out to Istanbul to search for his missing daughter. Written by Simon Tyrrell and directed by Adrian Shergold, the film gathered 5.93m viewers.

The DVD of the film was released on 13 September 2004, a week prior to broadcast. In the United States, the film aired on PBS under the title Disappeared.

== Plot ==
Harry Sands (Ray Winstone) and his wife Joanna (Lindsey Coulson) are concerned when their daughter, Olivia (Rebecca Clarke), fails to make her regular weekend communication from Istanbul, where she is supposedly working as a charity volunteer. When Harry receives a call from Olivia's best friend, Manda (Emily Corrie), stating that Olivia hasn't been seen or heard from in two days, Harry decides to fly out to Istanbul to track her down. Upon his arrival, he meets with the British console Tom Wilson (Owen Oakeshott), who informs him that the police have begun their search for Olivia.

Harry later meets with Manda, but is shocked to discover that neither she nor Olivia have been working for the charity as they previously claimed – and that they have both been working as erotic dancers in the East/West club, run by Arto Fazouk (Kayvan Novak). Harry goes to speak to Arto, but discovers there is much more on offer at the club than just erotic dancing. Meanwhile, Harry learns that Olivia was sent flowers by British businessman Peter Vine (David Westhead), whom he suspects may have been grooming Olivia.

Harry then meets with local Inspector Yilmaz (Haluk Bilginer), who explains that the police have no solid evidence on which they can raid Fazouk's club. However, when Harry later meets a friend of Manda's, who previously worked at the club, she explains that a young Danish girl, Elena Ekstrom (Marit Velle Kile), disappeared in similar circumstances several months ago. She explains that Fazouk's father, Metit (Dimitri Andreas), took a shine to Elena and suspects that he has taken her to his private house on a nearby island. She also reveals that Metit also took the same shine to Olivia.

Harry also suspects that the British console may be protecting Peter Vine, having secured a deal with Vine's construction company for the sale of a number of vessels used to combat drug trafficking. Meanwhile, Harry's son Michael (Gary Lucy) flies out to Istanbul to help with the search. Harry, deciding that Fazouk knows more than he is letting on, threatens him at gunpoint in front of a club full of paying customers. Michael manages to make Harry see sense, but throws his gun into the river before he can cause any further damage. Inspector Yilmaz warns Harry to stay away from Fazouk and let the police continue with their investigation.

Back in England, Joanna receives a postcard, seemingly from Olivia, stating that she is safe and well but need to get away for a while. When Harry shows the postcard to the local police, they confirm it was sent from the Island where Fazouk has a private house. Meanwhile, Joanna contacts the airline who issued Olivia's ticket, who inform her Olivia re-entered the UK two days ago. However, when she and Harry meet to review CCTV footage of her arrival, they find that somebody else has used Olivia's passport and ticket.

Harry breaks into Fazouk's house, where he finds Elena alive and well, but there is no sign of Olivia. Back at Manda's house, Joanna notices the woman who used Olivia's passport in a photo in Olivia's scrapbook. Manda explains that the girl was a cafe worker that they met whilst travelling six weeks ago, who lives in the Kurdish suburbs with her mother and younger brother. But just as Harry and Joanna journey to the suburbs, a bomb goes off at the British embassy, killing the British console. As unrest starts to unfold across the country, Harry and Joanna meet with a Kurdish woman who claims that Olivia gave her passport and plane ticket to her daughter as an act of kindness, to allow her to come to Britain to be with her husband and young daughter.

Harry and Joanna begin to realise that Olivia's disappearance may not be as sinister as they first thought. But when a call finally comes in with a lead on her whereabouts, are Harry and Joanna set to be re-united with their daughter, or has tragedy struck?

== Cast ==
- Ray Winstone as Harry Sands
- Lindsey Coulson as Joanna Sands
- Gary Lucy as Michael Sands
- Rebecca Clarke as Olivia Sands
- Emily Corrie as Manda Clarke
- Haluk Bilginer as Inspector Yilmaz
- Owen Oakeshott as Tom Wilson
- David Westhead as Peter Vine
- Kayvan Novak as Arto Fazouk
- Marit Velle Kile as Elena Ekstrom
