= This City Is Ours =

British television series

- Genre: Crime drama
- Created by: Stephen Butchard
- Written by: Stephen Butchard; Robbie O'Neill
- Directed by: Saul Dibb; John Hayes; Eshref Reybrouck; Chris Baugh
- Starring: Sean Bean; James Nelson-Joyce; Hannah Onslow; Jack McMullen; Bobby Schofield; Julie Graham; Laura Aikman; Saoirse-Monica Jackson; Darci Shaw
- Music by: Rael Jones
- Country of origin: United Kingdom
- Original language: English
- No. of series: 2
- No. of episodes: 16

Production
- Executive producers: Andy Harries; Sian McWilliams; Rebecca Hodgson; Stephen Butchard; Saul Dibb
- Producer: Simon Maloney
- Running time: 57 minutes
- Production company: Left Bank Pictures

Original release
- Network: BBC One
- Release: 23 March 2025 – present

This City Is Ours is a British crime drama television series created by Stephen Butchard for BBC One. Set in Liverpool, it was produced by Left Bank Pictures and premiered on 23 March 2025. In May 2025, it was renewed for a second series which aired on 25 October 2026. On 20 October 2026, prior to the broadcast of the second series, the BBC announced that the show would return for a third series.

== Synopsis ==
The series initially centres around Liverpudlian crime boss Ronnie Phelan, whose desire to retire from criminal life, after one last major drug deal, triggers an intense power struggle between his long-time right-hand man, Michael Kavanagh, and Phelan's impetuous son Jamie.

== Cast and characters ==
- Sean Bean as Ronnie Phelan (series 1; guest series 2), leader of the gang
- James Nelson-Joyce as Michael Kavanagh, Ronnie's right-hand man
- Hannah Onslow as Diana Williams, Michael's girlfriend, a restaurant manager
- Jack McMullen as Jamie Phelan, Ronnie's son and a senior gang member
- Darci Shaw as Melissa Sullivan, Jamie's fiancée and mother of his baby son
- Julie Graham as Elaine Phelan, Ronnie's wife and Jamie's mother
- Laura Aikman as Rachel Duffy (series 1–2), Jamie's cousin and the gang's accountant
- Stephen Walters as Davey Crawford (series 1), a senior gang member
- Saoirse-Monica Jackson as Cheryl Crawford, Davey's wife
- Mike Noble as George "Banksey" Banks, Michael's right-hand man and enforcer
- Bobby Schofield as Peter "Bonehead" Murphy (series 1–2), Jamie's right-hand man and enforcer
- Kevin Harvey as Bobby Duffy, Rachel's husband and a senior gang member
- Daniel Cerqueira as Ricardo Guzman, a senior representative of "the Amigos", the Colombian cartel from which the gang buys its cocaine
- Leanne Best as Lesley Williams, Diana's mother, serving a life sentence for the murder of Diana's father
- Adam Abbou as Freddie Banks (series 1–2), Banksey's son who helps the gang in their activities
- Shaun Evans as Ozzie Thompson (series 2), former cellmate of Banksey
- Álvaro Morte as Felipe Guzman, brother of Ricardo Guzman (series 2)

== Production ==
The eight-part series was commissioned in February 2024. Andy Harries of Left Bank Pictures served as an executive producer, Butchard is lead writer and Robbie O’Neill is writing further episodes. In May 2024, Sean Bean was confirmed in the lead role and the cast also includes James Nelson-Joyce, Hannah Onslow, Jack McMullen, Julie Graham, Laura Aikman, Saoirse-Monica Jackson and Darci Shaw.

This City is Ours has filming locations including Liverpool and Spain with filming beginning in May 2024. Filming of the second series commenced in October 2025. Ahead of the broadcast of the second series in October 2026, it was renewed for a third series.

The series features extensive use of 1950s and 60s soul and swing music by the likes of Matt Monro, Bobby Darin, Dean Martin and Frida Boccara and the use of the song The House of Bamboo by Andy Williams, and performed by Liverpool singer George Gallagher, and accompanied by a line dance by a central family in the show.

== Episodes ==
Series	Episodes	Originally released		Average viewership (in millions)
Series	Episodes	First released	Last released	Average viewership (in millions)
1 (Note: All episodes were released on BBC iPlayer on 23 March 2025.)	8	23 March 2025	11 May 2025	3.64
2 (Note: All episodes were released on BBC iPlayer on 25 October 2026.)	8	25 October 2026	16 November 2026	TBA

=== Series 1 (2025) ===
No. overall	No. in series	Episode	Directed by	Written by	Original release date	UK viewers (millions)
1	1	Episode 1	Saul Dibb	Stephen Butchard	23 March 2025	3.64
2	2	Episode 2	Saul Dibb	Stephen Butchard	30 March 2025	3.35
3	3	Episode 3	Saul Dibb	Stephen Butchard	6 April 2025	3.41
4	4	Episode 4	John Hayes	Robbie O'Neill & Stephen Butchard	13 April 2025	3.50
5	5	Episode 5	John Hayes	Robbie O'Neill & Stephen Butchard	20 April 2025	3.92
6	6	Episode 6	John Hayes	Stephen Butchard	27 April 2025	4.11
7	7	Episode 7	Eshref Reybrouck	Stephen Butchard	4 May 2025	3.74
8	8	Episode 8	Eshref Reybrouck	Stephen Butchard	11 May 2025	3.48

=== Series 2 (2026) ===
No. overall	No. in series	Episode	Directed by	Written by	Original release date	UK viewers (millions)
9	1	Episode 1	Saul Dibb	Stephen Butchard	25 October 2026	3.73
10	2	Episode 2	Saul Dibb	Stephen Butchard	26 October 2026	3.20
11	3	Episode 3	Chris Baugh	Stephen Butchard	1 November 2026	3.65
12	4	Episode 4	Chris Baugh	Robbie O'Neill & Stephen Butchard	2 November 2026	TBD
13	5	Episode 5	Chris Baugh	Stephen Butchard	8 November 2026	TBD
14	6	Episode 6	John Hayes	Stephen Butchard	9 November 2026	TBD
15	7	Episode 7	John Hayes	Stephen Butchard	15 November 2026	TBD
16	8	Episode 8	John Hayes	Stephen Butchard	16 November 2026	TBD

== Broadcast ==
The first series premiered on 23 March 2025 on BBC One with all the episodes made available on BBC iPlayer.

On 5 March 2026, the series began streaming in the United States on AMC+.

The second series premiered on 25 October 2026 on BBC One with all the episodes made available on BBC iPlayer.

== Reception ==
The series was the most watched new drama on the BBC in 2025.

=== Critical reception ===
Anita Singh in The Daily Telegraph awarded the show five stars and praised the performances, especially that of Nelson-Joyce. Carol Midgley in The Times awarded the show four stars and praised the "modern, witty and authentic" dialogue, as well as the on-screen chemistry between Nelson-Joyce and Sean Bean. Lucy Mangan in The Guardian also praised the performances but awarded the show three stars, finding it rather "generic”. Rachel Cooke for The New Statesman described it as "marvellous and witty" and compared it to a "superior Scouse Dallas", with "its unfeeling, brutish men" and "its ruthlessly ambitious women". Phil Harrison for The Independent gave the show four stars, commenting that the moral complexities and depth of the characters raised the drama from cliche. Dan Einav in The Financial Times described it as "solid but unspectacular", noting that the "idiosyncrasies of Liverpudlian speech, clothing and humour are not simply background details — they are made integral to the identity" of the series.

The review aggregator website Rotten Tomatoes reported a 93% approval rating based on 14 critic reviews.

=== Accolades ===
The series was nominated for Best Drama at the 2026 British Academy Television Awards, with Nelson-Joyce nominated for acting. The series was nominated for Best Drama at the 2026 Royal Television Society Programme Awards.
