= The Hot Potato =

2012 British film

- Directed by: Tim Lewiston
- Written by: Tim Lewiston
- Release date: 2012
- Country: United Kingdom
- Language: English

The Hot Potato is a 2012 British comedy crime thriller film. It was directed and written by Tim Lewiston and stars Ray Winstone, Colm Meaney and Jack Huston in the lead roles. The film is a throwback to the crime caper films that were popular in the 1960s and pays homage to several of these, including The Italian Job.

The film premiered on 4 July 2012 at the East End Film Festival.

== Plot ==
One evening in 1969, a Ministry of Defence's facility in London is completely destroyed by a huge explosion. To their surprise, Danny and Kenny come into possession of a strange object from the blast: a large lump of solid uranium that looks remarkably like a hot potato.

The pair quickly learn of their find's potential worth as well as its radioactive dangers. With the aid of Danny's girlfriend Carole, the three set off on an adventure to sell it, dodging police and other criminals also on the hunt for the uranium.

== Cast ==
Actor	Role
Ray Winstone	Kenny
Colm Meaney	Harry
Jack Huston	Danny
David Harewood	Harrison
John Lynch	Bill
Philip Davis	Sgt Ryan
Derren Nesbitt	Fritz Meyer
Lois Winstone	Carole
Maike Billitis	Claudia
Jean-Louis Sbille	Ernst Koppel
Louise Redknapp	Irene Smith

== See also ==
- "To drop like a hot potato"
