= Lois Winstone =

English actress

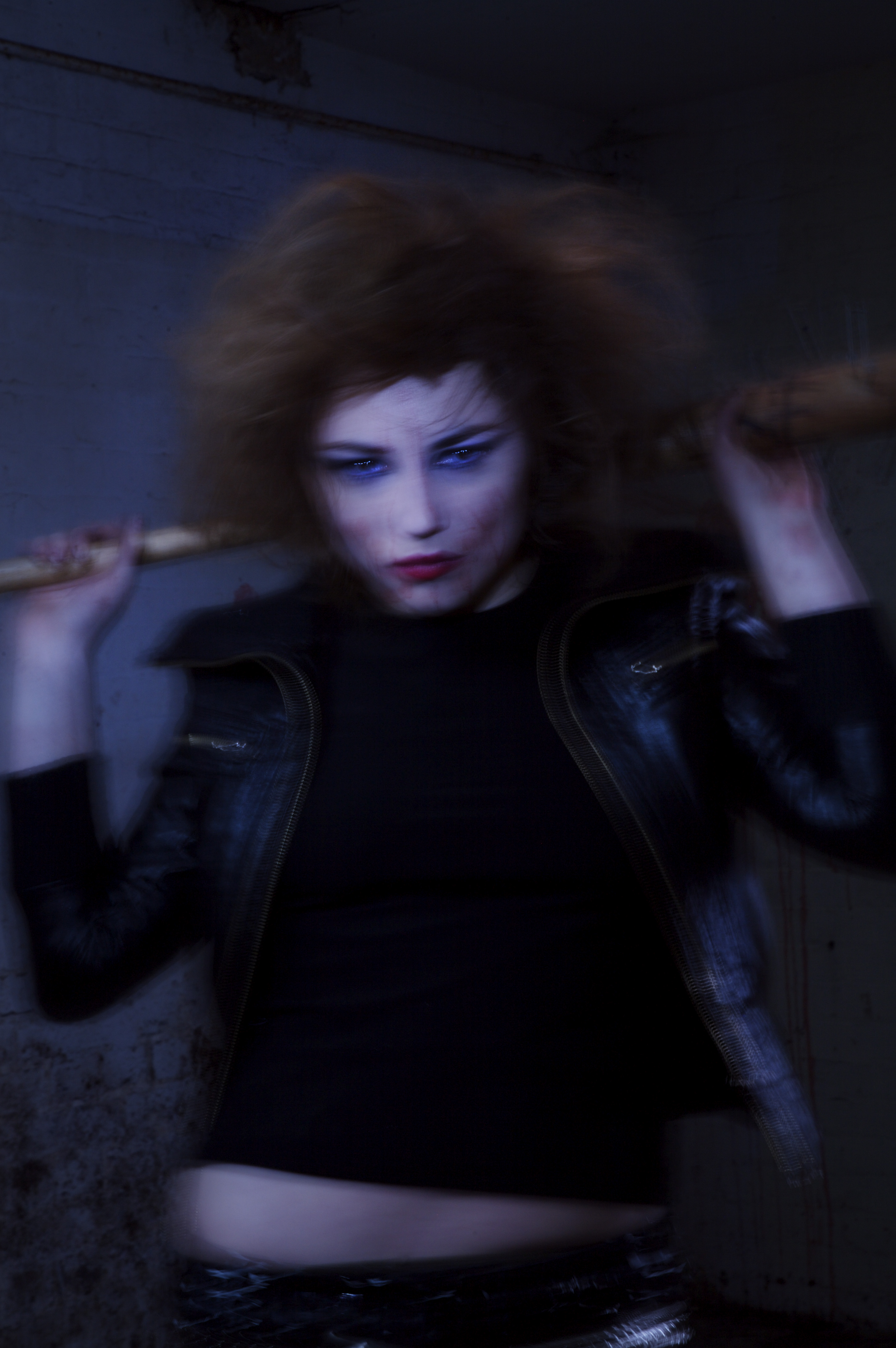
- Winstone as Lilith in Beyond the Rave, 2007
- Born: March 1982 (age 44)
- Other name: Baby Bo
- Education: Southgate College
- Occupations: Actress, musician
- Years active: 1997-present
- Parent(s): Ray Winstone; Elaine McCausland
- Relatives: Jaime Winstone (sister)

Lois Elaine Winstone (born March 1982) is an English actress. Her credits include Holby City, Last Orders (2001), The Bill (2002), Everything (2004), Perfect Day (2005), Beyond the Rave (2007), The Hot Potato (2011), and Game of Thrones (season 4) (2014).

== Early life ==
Lois Elaine Winstone, was born in March 1982, in Westminster, London, Winstone is the eldest daughter of English actor Ray Winstone, and his wife, Elaine McCausland. Her younger sister Jaime is also an actress. She was attended Enfield County School. Later, the family moved to Roydon, Essex. She took a course at the Artists Theatre School in Ealing, where coincidentally her father is now a patron (2025), but did not finish the course.

== Career ==
Her first major acting role was an uncredited part in Gary Oldman's 1997 drama Nil by Mouth, alongside her father. Lois appeared with her father again in Last Orders (2001), this time playing the credited role of Kath. She appeared in four episodes of The Bill (2002), playing Chloe Kendrick. Two years later in 2004 she appeared in the episode "Night Fever" of Holby City.

In 2004, she appeared alongside her father again, in Everything. 2005 saw Lois appear in the TV film Perfect Day. In 2006, Winstone played the role of Kirsty in the TV mini-series, When Evil Calls. She described her character as "a gothic schoolgirl lesbian". In 2007, she played Lilith in Beyond the Rave. In 2011 she appeared in the British indie film, The Hot Potato, alongside her father. In 2014, she appeared in two episodes of Game of Thrones, season 4, as the "Mole's Town whore".

Winstone was the face and body of the Ann Summers Spring Summer 2009 Enchantment lingerie collection.

In 2014, after Game of Thrones, Winstone stopped acting to form the band Lois & The Love, releasing their debut album, Love Is Louder in 2014, and released the single Pinocchio in 2015.

Winstone is part of electro pop group This Year's Model, brain-child of Manchester techno guru DNCN. She also goes by the stage name "Baby Bo" as part of the London-based hip hop trio Crack Village, a former member being rapper Akira the Don. She describes joining the group as "a fluke".
