= Everything (film) =

- Directed by: Richard Hawkins
- Screenplay by: Richard Hawkins
- Cinematography: Ole Bratt Birkeland
- Edited by: Oliver Potterton
- Music by: Tom Ingleby
- Release date: 2004
- Language: English

Everything is a 2004 British dramatic feature, written and directed by Richard Hawkins. Hawkins was nominated for a BAFTA for Most Promising Newcomer for his work (the award is now described as being for an 'Outstanding Debut by a British Writer, Director or Producer').

Ray Winstone stars as Richard, who over consecutive days keeps visiting Naomi, a Soho prostitute (played by actor/singer Jan Graveson). He does not seem to be there to have sex, so Naomi is unsure why he keeps paying to see her.

The film was shot in 10 days on HD on a low budget.

Although the film is largely built around Winstone and Graveson, the cast also includes Katherine Clisby, Ed Deedigan, Kris Deedigan and Winstone's real-life daughter Lois. The music was composed by Tom Ingleby.
