= Vincent (TV series) =

British television series

- Genre: Crime drama
- Created by: Stephen Butchard
- Written by: Stephen Butchard
- Directed by: Peter Lydon; Terry McDonough; Jeremy Lovering; Roger Gartland
- Starring: Ray Winstone; Suranne Jones; Joe Absolom; Angel Coulby; Ian Puleston-Davies; Philip Glenister; Sandra Huggett; Eva Pope
- Composer: Rob Lane
- Country of origin: United Kingdom
- Original language: English
- No. of series: 2
- No. of episodes: 8 (list of episodes)

Production
- Executive producers: Sita Williams; Andy Harries
- Producers: Rebecca Hodgson; John Rushton
- Production locations: Heywood, Greater Manchester, England
- Cinematography: Lukas Strebel; Kieran McGuigan; Ben Smithard
- Editors: Edward Mansell; Luke Dunkley
- Running time: 90 minutes
- Production company: Granada Television

Original release
- Network: ITV
- Release: 10 October 2005 – 6 November 2006

Vincent is a British television crime drama series, created and principally written by Stephen Butchard, that first broadcast on ITV on 10 October 2005.

== Premise ==
Vincent follows the work of a private detective agency based in Manchester, run by private investigator Vincent Gallagher (Ray Winstone), who alongside his sidekick Beth (Suranne Jones), junior PI Robert (Joe Absolom) and fellow team members Gillian (Angel Coulby) and John (Ian Puleston-Davies), investigates cases which the police would either refuse to touch, or have been unable to solve. Vincent also has to deal with his arch enemy, DCI David Driscoll (Philip Glenister), who begins a relationship with his estranged wife Cathy (Eva Pope), resulting in Cathy becoming pregnant.

Following strong viewership and critical acclaim for the first series, a second four-part series was commissioned, which began transmission on 16 October 2006. Despite retaining consistent viewing figures, and Winstone's expressed interest in continuing in the role, ITV executives chose to axe Vincent following the conclusion of the second series.

The complete series was released on DVD on 13 November 2006 via ITV Studios Home Entertainment. On 25 February 2016, all eight episodes were also made available for download on the ITV Store. Both series of Vincent were also broadcast in the United States on BBC America.

== Cast ==
- Ray Winstone as Vincent Gallagher
- Suranne Jones as Beth Goddard
- Joe Absolom as Robert Ellison
- Angel Coulby as Gillian Lafferty
- Ian Puleston-Davies as John Thompson
- Philip Glenister as DCI David Driscoll (Series 1)
- Sandra Huggett as Roxanne (Series 1)
- Eva Pope as Cathy Gallagher (Series 1)

== Episodes ==
=== Series 1 (2005) ===
No. overall	No. in series	Title	Directed by	Written by	Original release date	Viewers (millions)
1	1	"Love and Devotion"	Peter Lydon	Stephen Butchard	10 October 2005	7.02
Vincent and the team are working on a case of suspected adultery. Gary De Silva (Marc Warren), a devoted husband who suspects his beloved wife, Sarah (Charlotte Emerson) is cheating on him, turns to Vincent and the team for help. Vincent can't refuse because his own partner, Cathy, recently left him for DCI David Driscoll and Vincent's pain is still raw. Keeping a vigilant eye on Sarah, Vincent and Beth watch her every move. They follow her to a club and straight into the arms of another man. Gary's suspicions are confirmed and Vincent immediately calls him to break the news, sending Gary into a frenzy ...
2	2	"The Prodigal Son"	Peter Lydon	Stephen Butchard	17 October 2005	6.07
When his perfect son, Ian, is knifed to death in a nightclub, his wealthy father Edward Harper (Rupert Frazer) calls on Vincent and the team to investigate the murder. The prime suspect is Ian's friend, James O'Connor (Adam Rayner), but the police are unable to touch him due to the lack of evidence and willingness of witnesses to talk. Much to Vincent's annoyance the investigating officer on the case is his personal and professional rival DCI Driscoll. James's father is none other than notorious nightclub owner, Terry O'Connor (Roy Marsden) and it was in one of his clubs that Ian was killed. Unable to resist the temptation of this intriguing and potentially dangerous case, Vincent pays a visit to Terry's nightclub.
3	3	"Dual Personality"	Roger Gartland	Stephen Butchard	24 October 2005	5.98
Vincent's personal life is now in complete turmoil, after Cathy calls round to tell him that she's pregnant with Driscoll's baby. Vincent's devastated because she always said she didn't want to have children, but now she's found new love she's changed her mind. He decides to throw himself into a new case when recent lottery winner, Andrea Kendall is mysteriously killed, as she celebrates her win with the rest of the syndicate, her fiancé, Donny Watson (Stuart Laing), flamboyant salsa teacher, Deborah Finnigan (Tracie Bennett), and disgruntled Joe (Seamus O'Neill) and Pam Morgan, who pulled out of the syndicate just weeks before the win. Another winner, Sheena Bennett (Kate Gartside) has asked Vincent and the team to investigate. Sheena is concerned that suspicion is falling upon her brother Malcolm (Shaun Dooley), who suffers from a personality disorder and was seen following Andrea, as she left the celebration. Vincent instantly likes Malcolm and feels for Sheena when he realises she's had to bring him up as her own child, leaving her without a life of her own.
4	4	"The Rich and the Guilty"	Roger Gartland	Stephen Butchard	31 October 2005	6.58
When housewife Sally Mortimer (Barbara Durkin) finds thousands of pounds stashed in her husband, William's (Terence Mann) wardrobe, she's extremely suspicious and calls on Vincent and the team to investigate. Supposedly going away on business, John tails William to the airport. As he checks in for Madrid, John is only too happy to hop on the same flight. Confident that his team are on the Mortimer case, Vincent takes on another client, Keith Evans (Stephen Tomlin), who is concerned that his teenage son, Joel is acting out of character and mixing with the wrong crowd. Vincent asks Robert to keep a vigilant eye on Joel. At the hotel William is greeted by a beautiful woman, Julia (Maggie O'Neill) and it's clear his trip is less business, more pleasure ...

=== Series 2 (2006) ===
No. overall	No. in series	Title	Directed by	Written by	Original release date	Viewers (millions)
5	1	"Taking the Rap"	Terry McDonagh	Stephen Butchard	16 October 2006	5.36
Vincent is called upon by distraught wife Selina, whose husband, Raymond, has confessed to the murder of chambermaid Eva Krackowic (Carolyn Ann Jones), and is serving time as a result. He's received a substantial financial payment and Selina, who's convinced her husband is being paid to do time for someone else, wants to nail the real killer and find out who is funding the cover up. After visiting The Central, the plush hotel where Raymond and Eva worked, Vincent pays Raymond a surprise visit in prison and asks him if he's really thought this through, while Selina begs her husband to tell the truth. Kenyon insists he was sleeping with Eva and because she threatened to blow the lid on their affair, he snapped and killed her. But Vincent doesn't buy it and, after getting his hands on some pictures from the crime scene, begins an investigation to find out if Raymond is the killer or not.
6	2	"Soldiers of a False Army"	Jeremy Lovering	Stephen Butchard	23 October 2006	5.54
Vincent is employed by a cheating husband, Paul Hewitt, who fell for honey trap Laura. She not only seduced him, but she also drugged him and made off with his wedding ring. Laura eventually agrees to hand the ring over for £500, which Beth pays. But when their meeting is interrupted by an elusive character called Gavin West (Anthony Flanagan), Beth's forced to leave without the ring or the money. Meanwhile, Vincent's attentions then turn to Gavin West, especially when he learns that he's the president of a security firm and nothing happens on the estate without his say so. After following him and his 'soldiers' to a church community hall, Vincent and Beth senses trouble. They find Father Frank at breaking point and are shocked to learn the centre's been a target for some time. Will Frank take up Vincent's offer of help?
7	3	"The Bodies Beneath"	Terry McDonagh	Ed Whitmore	30 October 2006	5.45
Teenager Amy has been murdered and all the hallmarks match serial killer Stephen Knight. So, the police, who are convinced they have their man, close the case. But then, Amy's mother receives a letter from Knight confessing to other murders but not Amy's. Not knowing what to believe, she calls on Vincent's help. Despite resistance from the police about their involvement, Vincent and Beth go and see Knight in prison, who insists the real killer is still out there. Then it emerges Amy worked as a temp for Nelson Global. Is there more going on at the company then anyone else first realised?
8	4	"Under Fire"	Jeremy Lovering	Stephen Butchard	6 November 2006	5.52
Vincent is called upon by single parent Daniel Stevens, who finds his home under attack and fears for the safety of his young daughter, Chloe. When it becomes clear there has been an intruder, Beth moves in as cover and finds herself enjoying her ready-made family. Meanwhile, Daniel's mate Eddie, who Robert has under constant surveillance, is found dead in his home. How is the death linked to the break in? And, when Beth and Chloe are kidnapped from the school gates, Vincent faces a race against time to find the link between Daniel and the killer and rescue them before it's too late.
