= Common (film) =

- Written by: Jimmy McGovern
- Directed by: David Blair
- Starring: Nico Mirallegro; Michelle Fairley; Michael Gambon
- Theme music composer: Adrian Johnston
- Country of origin: United Kingdom
- Original language: English

Production
- Producer: Colin McKeown
- Cinematography: Dirk Nel
- Editor: Patrick Hall
- Running time: 90 minutes

Original release
- Network: BBC One
- Release: 6 July 2014

Common is a 2014 BBC One 90-minute made-for-television drama, written by Jimmy McGovern, directed by David Blair and starring Nico Mirallegro, Michelle Fairley and Michael Gambon. It seeks to question some of the issues and challenges raised by England and Wales's common purpose legal doctrine.

== Background ==
The drama focuses on England and Wales's controversial joint enterprise doctrine. It is set in North West England, and was filmed in Liverpool (although the city is never mentioned).

First shown on 6 July 2014, the drama examines the issues surrounding a case in which the defendants were charged with murder involving joint enterprise or common purpose. McGovern was inspired by the real life case of 16-year-old Jordan Cunliffe, sentenced under this law for a minimum term of 12 years for the murder of Garry Newlove, despite Cunliffe not actively taking part in the attack.

== Plot ==
Johnjo O'Shea is an ordinary 17-year-old except that he is a haemophiliac. He is asked to give a few friends of his older brother a lift in his brother's car so that they can visit a pizza takeaway. Johnjo is unaware that one of his passengers has been tipped off by a friend who runs that shift at the pizza place that an adversary is about to enter and that the real reason for wanting a lift is to get there quickly to confront him. One of the other boys starts an argument with a bystander (Tommy Ward) and stabs him fatally. The drama then follows the police and legal procedures as well as the conflicts between family members, the boys involved and the community. Although he and his family consider him to be an innocent bystander, he ends up in court charged as an accessory to murder, under the doctrine of common purpose (the "common" of the film's title), which may also make reference to the view that segments of society might take of the working-class youths involved.

The end shows Johnjo's mother and Margaret Ward, the mother of the murdered boy, talking in the street. The latter shows the former a letter that she received from Johnjo that apologises for what happened and accepts a degree of culpability because even though he had not taken part, the fact that he was born allowed it to happen. Both mothers see the truth in Johnjo's innocence, the flawed decency in his view on culpability and the tragedy that both will be deprived of innocent sons although only one permanently. They embrace before Margaret Ward turns and walks away.

== Critical reception ==
The Daily Telegraph gave it 4/5 stars, calling it "profoundly engaging", with Nico Mirallegro, "giving a fine performance of coiled vulnerability". According to The Guardian, "When Jimmy McGovern gets off his soapbox this is a brutal and devastating drama", "bleak, powerful drama thick with political intent, which occasionally robs it of its quality", and "the knockout performance belongs to Susan Lynch, who plays the victim's mother".

The Daily Mirror noted that "Common was unrelentingly depressing. It's about real tragedy, where no character you invest in wins". And "McGovern's a genius wordsmith, an engaging social commentator who deftly avoids being throat-ramming with his message, but he also understands people – as sure as he can paint the most evil potential of mankind, he equally draws out the good."

== Cast ==
- Nico Mirallegro as Johnjo O’Shea
- Philip Hill-Pearson as Tony, his cousin
- Ben Smith as Patrick, his brother
- Jodhi May as Coleen O'Shea, his mother
- Andrew Tiernan as Pete O'Shea, his father
- Finn Atkins as Karen O'Shea, his sister
- Andrew Ellis as Kieran Gillespie
- Jack McMullen as Colin McCabe
- Susan Lynch as Margaret Ward, the victim's mother
- Daniel Mays as Tommy Ward, the victim's father
- Harry McMullen as Thomas Ward, the victim
- Robert Pugh as DI Hastings
- Michelle Fairley as Tony’s mother, Shelagh
- Dean Smith as Hugo Davies
- Michael Gambon as the Judge
