= James Nelson-Joyce =

English actor (born 1989/90)

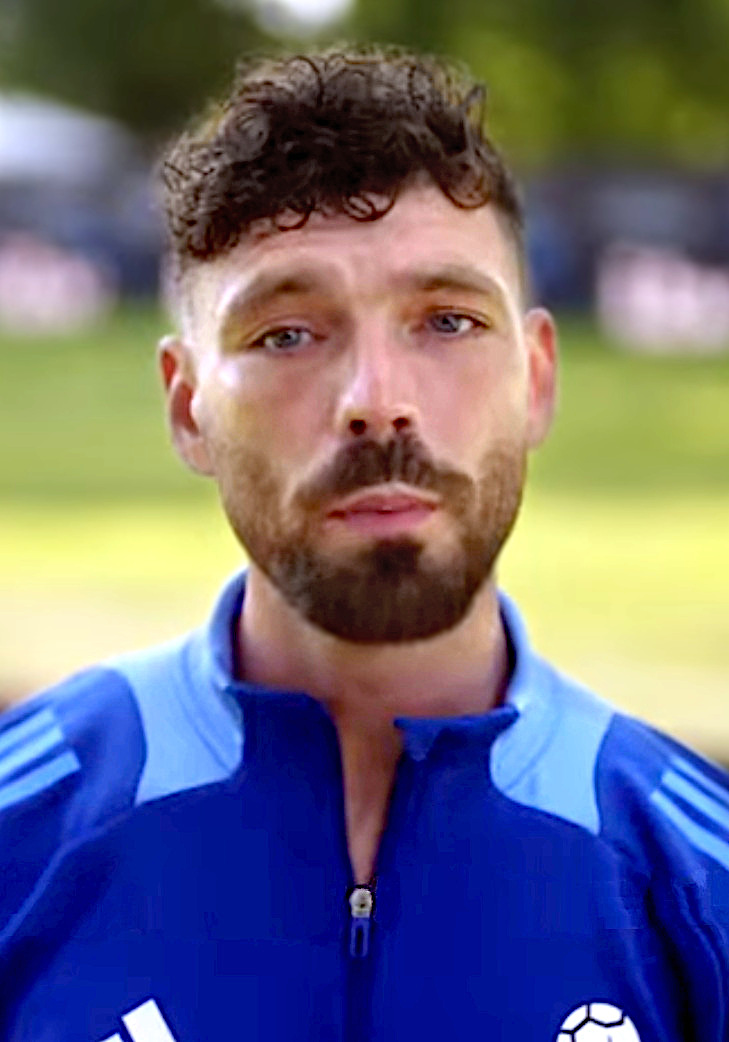
- Nelson-Joyce, Soccer Aid for Unicef 2025
- Born: 1989 or 1990 (age 36–37); Orrell Park, Liverpool, Merseyside, England
- Education: City of Liverpool College + Italia Conti Academy of Theatre Arts
- Occupation: Actor
- Years active: 2013–present

James Nelson-Joyce is an English actor, known for playing the tough guy or villainous characters, who has had roles in Mount Pleasant (2016), Little Boy Blue (2017), The Nest (2020), Time (2021), The Outlaws (2021), Industry (2022), The Gold (2023), A Town Called Malice (2023), Guy Ritchie's The Covenant (2023), Reputation (2024), Bird (2024), This City Is Ours and A Thousand Blows (both 2025).

== Early life ==
Nelson-Joyce was born to a working-class family from Walton, Liverpool. He left school without qualifications, not realising at the time that he was dyslexic, but followed advice from his English teacher, Miss Griffiths, who recognised his potential for acting, encouraging him to study at The City of Liverpool College. He furthered his acting education at the Italia Conti Academy of Theatre Arts.

== Career ==
Nelson-Joyce's first notable role, in 2017, was playing the teenage gang member James Yates, who provided the gun that killed 11-year-old Rhys Jones in the ITV Liverpool based drama Little Boy Blue. In 2019, Nelson-Joyce was the lead in the Lena Headey directed BAFTA nominated short film The Trap.

In 2020, he co-starred with Maisie Williams in the Lena Headey directed music video "Miracle" by Madeon.

In 2021, he starred in six episodes of the BBC Bristol based crime comedy series The Outlaws, in a cast that included Christopher Walken, Stephen Merchant and Eleanor Tomlinson. The same year, He worked with Stephen Graham and Sean Bean, playing bullying convict Johnno in the Jimmy McGovern directed BBC prison drama Time. Nelson-Joyce is known for playing the tough guy or villainous characters.

In 2023, he continued in this role as Brian Reader in 1983 Brink's-Mat robbery series The Gold, also starring Hugh Bonneville, Dominic Cooper, Charlotte Spencer, Jack Lowden, Tom Cullen and Emun Elliott, and in the Sky Max 1980s British family gangster series A Town Called Malice as an enemy of the Lord family. The same year, he made a very brief appearance in Guy Ritchie's The Covenant alongside Jake Gyllenhaal and Alexander Ludwig.

In October 2023, Nelson-Joyce filmed the lead role in the British indie crime feature Reputation, as drug dealer Wes. The film premiered at the BIFA-qualifying Spirit of Independence Film Festival in 2024 and received strong reviews.

In 2025, he secured a main role as boxer Edward 'Treacle' Goodson, working alongside Stephen Graham in A Thousand Blows, and a main role as gangster Michael Kavanagh working alongside Sean Bean in This City Is Ours. For the latter, Nelson-Joyce received a nomination for the British Academy Television Award for Best Actor in 2026.

The same year, Nelson-Joyce was named as one of the cast in the 7th season of Charlie Brooker's British anthology sci-fi future technology based television series Black Mirror in the episode "Plaything".

== Filmography ==
=== Film ===
Year	Title	Role	Notes
2019	Money Shot	Sean	Short films
2019	Bee	Bradley	Short films
2019	The Trap	Joe	Short films
2020	The Nest	Taxi Driver	
2020	Brothers by Blood	Leonard	Originally known as The Sound of Philadelphia
2021	Eyeholes	Mac	Short film
2023	Guy Ritchie's The Covenant	Jack 'Jack Jack' Jackson	
2023	Safe	Daz	Short film
2023	The Trap	Joe	Feature-length version of the 2019 short film
2024	Bird	Skate	
2024	Ryan Can't Read	Tyrone	Short film
2024	Reputation	Wes	
TBA	Amazing Grace	Karl	Post-production

=== Television ===
Year	Title	Role	Notes
2013	Shameless	Benny	Series 11; episode 12: "Early Retirement"
2014	Casualty	Frankie Macfarland	Series 28; episode 30: "The Lies We Tell"
2014	Cilla	Degsy	Mini-series; episodes 1 & 2
2015	No Offence	Franny Lowry	Series 1; episode 4
2016	Vera	Jason McNeive	Series 6; episode 3: "The Moth Catcher"
2016	Mount Pleasant	Liam	Series 6; episodes 2–4 & 6–10
2017	Little Boy Blue	James Yates	Main role; mini-series; all 4 episodes
2019	The Virtues	Ryan	Mini-series; episode 2
2019	The Rook	Henry Hylton Foster	Episode 2: "Chapter 2"
2019	World on Fire	Tony	Series 1; episode 5
2021	Innocent	Aaron Holmes	Series 2; episodes 3 & 4
2021	Time	Johnno	Series 1; episodes 1–3
2021	The Outlaws	Spider	Series 1; episodes 1–6
2022	The Responder	Greg Gallagher	Series 1; episodes 4 & 5
2022	Industry	Jamie Henson	Series 2; episodes 4 & 6
2023	The Family Pile	Greg	Main role; episodes 1–6
2023	The Gold	Brian Reader	Series 1; episodes 2, 3 & 6
2023	A Town Called Malice	Barney	Episodes 1 & 3
2024	Strike	Preston 'Pez' Pierce	Supporting role; series 6; episodes 1–3
2025	A Thousand Blows	Edward 'Treacle' Goodson	Main role; episodes 1–6
2025	Black Mirror	DCI Kano	Series 7; episode 4: "Plaything"
2025	Suspect: The Shooting of Jean Charles de Menezes	Firearms officer Charlie 2	Mini-series; episode 3
2025–present	This City Is Ours	Michael Kavanagh	Main role; 16 episodes

=== Music videos ===
Year	Artist	Track	Notes
2020	Noel Gallagher's High Flying Birds	"Blue Moon Rising"	
2020	Madeon	"Miracle"	
2024	Fontaines D.C.	"Bug"	
2025	Jamie Webster	"Across the river"	
2026	Louis Tomlinson	"Imposter"	

== Awards and nominations ==
Year	Award	Category	Work	Result	Ref.
2025	Unrestricted View Film Festival	Festival Prize - Best Actor (Feature)	Reputation	Nominated	
2026	BAFTA TV Awards	BAFTA TV Award - Best Actor	This City Is Ours	Nominated	
