= Ruby Hartley =

British actress

- Born: 9 November 1998 (age 27)
- Occupation: Actress

Ruby Hartley (born 9 November 1998) is a British actress.

Hartley attended Boringdon Primary School and worked as a child actress in various plays at the Theatre Royal Plymouth and at Plymkids Theatre Company. She took on other roles in the plays Machinal, Hedda Gabler, and Rage for the Richard Burton Theatre Company.

In 2019, Hartley graduated from the Royal Welsh College of Music & Drama. From 2020 to 2022, she played the role of Stiorra, daughter of the series' main character Uhtred of Bebbanburg played by Alexander Dreymon, in 16 episodes of the Netflix Originals drama, The Last Kingdom. It was her first acting job in the film industry.

== Selected filmography ==
- 2020–2022: The Last Kingdom (Television series, 16 episodes)

== Selected theatre ==
- Machinal, Director: Sean Linnen, The Richard Burton Theatre Company
- Hedda Gabler, Director: Chelsea Walker, The Richard Burton Theatre Company
- Rage, Director: Elle While, The Richard Burton Theatre Company
