= List of The Last Kingdom episodes =

The Last Kingdom is a British historical fiction television series based on Bernard Cornwell's The Saxon Stories series of novels. The first season debuted on BBC America on 10 October 2015, and BBC Two on 22 October 2015. The second season premiered on 16 March 2017 and was a joint venture between the BBC and Netflix. The first two seasons had 8 episodes on the DVD but were cut in such a way that TV channels could optionally send them as 10 shorter episodes. Netflix bought the rights exclusively for the third season, which was released on 19 November 2018. This was followed by a fourth season, which was released on 26 April 2020.

A fifth season was confirmed in July 2020; it was later announced that it would be the show's last. It was released on 9 March 2022.

== Series overview ==
Series	Episodes	Originally released		
Series	Episodes	First released	Last released	Network
1	8	10 October 2015	28 November 2015	BBC Two
2	8	16 March 2017	4 May 2017	BBC Two
3	10	19 November 2018		Netflix
4	10	26 April 2020		Netflix
5	10	9 March 2022		Netflix

== Episodes ==
=== Season 1 (2015) ===
No. overall	No. in season	Episode	Directed by	Written by	Original release date	UK viewers (millions)
1	1	Episode 1	Nick Murphy	Stephen Butchard	10 October 2015 (US); 22 October 2015 (UK)	2.02
In 866, Danish earl Ragnar leads a fleet of dragonships to the coast of Northumbria, where he kills the eldest son of the Saxon Lord of Bebbanburg Uhtred (Matthew Macfadyen). Uhtred engages Ragnar and his Danish army at Eoferwic. The Danes feign a retreat, leading the reserves of the Saxon army to attack, and then be flanked by a hidden force of Danes. Uhtred is killed, and his 10-year-old son Uhtred and a Saxon girl named Brida are taken as slaves by Ragnar. The boy later saves the Earl's daughter Thyra from Sven, son of Kjartan, one of Ragnar's ship captains. Sven is blinded in one eye as punishment and Kjartan is banished. Uhtred and Brida are adopted into Ragnar's family and raised as Danes and pagans. In young adulthood, Uhtred and Brida see Earl Ragnar killed when his hall is burned by a vengeful Kjartan and Sven. Only Thyra survives and she is captured and enslaved. Uhtred decides to embark on the task of regaining his lands from his uncle, Aelfric, who has usurped Uhtred's titles and inheritance and is now aligned with the Danes.
2	2	Episode 2	Nick Murphy	Stephen Butchard	17 October 2015 (US); 29 October 2015 (UK)	1.54
Uhtred is blamed for the death of Earl Ragnar during a reported Saxon uprising in the North. He pleads his innocence to Danish warlords Ubba and Guthrum, but he watches while they murder East Anglian King Edmund in the manner of Christian martyr Saint Sebastian. Ubba and Guthrum do not believe that Uhtred is innocent of Ragnar's death, so Uhtred and Brida flee to Winchester, capital of Wessex and the last surviving Saxon kingdom. There, Uhtred supplies information of an impending Danish attack, but Lord Alfred, brother of King Æthelred is uncertain whether the young couple can be trusted and advises the king to imprison them pending the outcome of the battle.
3	3	Episode 3	Anthony Byrne	Stephen Butchard	24 October 2015 (US); 5 November 2015 (UK)	1.58
King Æthelred and Alfred win the battle, but the king is mortally wounded, bequeathing his crown to Alfred rather than his own son, Æthelwold. Uhtred and Brida are released and Alfred seeks a peace treaty with Guthrum and Ubba. Uhtred advises Alfred what the Danes fear and watches Alfred negotiate peace to give Wessex time to prepare for future battles. Uhtred trains the Saxon army to be ready to face the Danes after pledging his allegiance to Alfred for a year. Brida miscarries Uhtred's child. Earl Ragnar's son, Ragnar the Younger returns from Ireland, seeking the truth about the death of Earl Ragnar. Realizing that Uhtred will not break his word to Alfred, Brida leaves with Ragnar who is bent on revenge against Kjartan.
4	4	Episode 4	Anthony Byrne	Stephen Butchard	31 October 2015 (US); 12 November 2015 (UK)	1.60
In order to gain land and become an Ealdorman, Uhtred is persuaded by Alfred to marry Mildrith. Unbeknown to Uhtred, she bears the burden of her deceased father's debt to the church, two thousand shillings. Uhtred realises he has been tricked. Despite this, love blossoms, and Mildrith becomes pregnant. The Danes, under Guthrum and Ragnar the Younger, capture the fortified town of Wareham. During peace talks, Uhtred and nine others, including a priest, are used in a hostage exchange with the Danes, with Uhtred sent by Alfred with instructions to escape and report back as soon as he learns of Ubba's return from Ireland. He meets his brother Ragnar and Brida again, who are now a couple. Meanwhile, Mildrith gives birth to a son. When the peace collapses, with Ubba's imminent return from Ireland, the hostages are all killed except Uhtred, who is allowed to leave after Ragnar's intervention. He spies a large Danish fleet under Guthrum and lights the first beacon warning Wessex of a new invasion.
5	5	Episode 5	Ben Chanan	Stephen Butchard	7 November 2015 (US); 19 November 2015 (UK)	1.60
Guthrum's Danish fleet lands in the south but loses many ships in a huge storm. Alfred goes south to defend against Guthrum and Uhtred joins the force led by Odda the Elder, facing Ubba and the Danes at Cynwit on the Severn. Uhtred sneaks into the Danish camp and sets fire to some of their ships, causing confusion. He is spotted and forced to fight Ubba to the death. He kills Ubba and Odda's forces arrive and defeat the Danes. But Odda is injured and, in Winchester, Odda the Younger persuades Alfred the victory was his work. Uhtred objects and is humiliated by Alfred. Mildrith, Uhtred, and their baby son (also Uhtred) return to their lands. Uhtred kills Oswald, the estate's steward, after realising that he has been cheating him.
6	6	Episode 6	Ben Chanan	Stephen Butchard	14 November 2015 (US); 26 November 2015 (UK)	1.55
Uhtred and Leofric leave Wessex with armed fighters dressed as Danes, to raid Cornwall and pay off Uhtred's debts. They are approached by Brother Asser, a monk. His king, Peradur, pays Uhtred and his band to attack a nearby fort held by Skorpa of the White Horse and his Vikings. Uhtred and Skorpa double-cross and kill Peradur and his men. Skorpa then double-crosses Uhtred to take the king's treasure, but Peradur's consort and soothsayer Iseult shows Uhtred the hidden main cache. Uhtred pays off his debt to the church with some of the loot. Uhtred and Iseult arrive at Alfred's court, where Uhtred is accused in the Witan by Asser of raiding Cornish territory. Leofric, who is forced to testify against Uhtred, pleads with Alfred to resolve the dispute by fighting Uhtred to the death.
7	7	Episode 7	Peter Hoar	Stephen Butchard	21 November 2015 (US); 3 December 2015 (UK)	1.54
Alfred offers to pardon Uhtred in return for resuming his debt to the church and sending Iseult back to Cornwall, but Uhtred refuses to abandon Iseult. During Leofric and Uhtred's fight to the death, Guthrum's army attacks and captures Winchester without a fight. Uhtred, Leofric, and Iseult rescue a nun, Hild who is being raped by Danes and escape Winchester, hiding in the Somerset marshlands. There they discover Alfred, fleeing the Danes with his family and a group of his priests to Athelney. The king sends a message to Wulfhere, Beocca, and Asser, who rally to him with their remaining forces. Iseult cures Alfred's sick son Edward but warns that another child will die as a result. Skorpa's fleet of ships is moored elsewhere in the marshes. Uhtred and his men lure the guards into the deeper marshes, where they are killed and their ships set alight.
8	8	Episode 8	Peter Hoar	Stephen Butchard	28 November 2015 (US); 10 December 2015 (UK)	1.65
Wulfhere and his men desert Alfred to join Guthrum. Alfred and his remaining force journey to Odda in the hope of gathering an army. Uhtred discovers his son has died, fulfilling Iseult's prophecy. Iseult also reveals that Uhtred's sister Thyra is still alive. Alfred sends messages for loyal troops to gather at Egbert's Stone. Odda the Younger rejects Alfred's request for troops. Odda the Elder kills his son for his treason, and his men join Alfred and meet up with the other troops. Alfred delivers a rousing battle speech and Uhtred leads the army in a shield wall. The Saxons push the Danes back but Leofric is mortally wounded. Skorpa leads his horsemen behind the Saxon army and slaughters all the camp followers, including Iseult. Skorpa taunts Uhtred with Iseult's severed head and on seeing this Uhtred goes berserk, breaks rank, charges over the Viking shield wall and kills Skorpa in retaliation. His rage opens a gap that allows the Saxons to pour through the Danes' defence and claim victory. Young Ragnar and Brida are taken as hostages to secure the new peace with the Danes, and Guthrum converts to Christianity having seen Alfred's victory as proof that his 'God is with him'. Uhtred, Hild, and Halig ride north to Bebbanburg.

=== Season 2 (2017) ===
No. overall	No. in season	Episode	Directed by	Written by	Original release date	UK viewers (millions)
9	1	Episode 1	Peter Hoar	Stephen Butchard	16 March 2017	1.60
In 878, the fearless and instinctive warrior Uhtred begins his voyage north to reclaim his ancestral lands of Bebbanburg. Alfred's conviction to unite the kingdoms of England is stronger than ever, and he sets his sights on the wildlands of the north, which have fallen under the control of the Danish warlords Erik and Sigefrid. Beocca recruits Uhtred and his companions to rescue Guthred, the king of Cumberland, from his Danish captors. Guthred is both Dane and Christian and the hope is that he will unite northern England against the pagan invaders. Guthred is held for ransom by Sven, and Uhtred pretends to be an undead warrior, sent by Odin to avenge the death of Ragnar the Elder. The ploy works and the Danes are scattered. At his keep in Dunholm, Kjartan hears the word of Uhtred's presence in Northumbria and plots revenge.
10	2	Episode 2	Peter Hoar	Stephen Butchard	23 March 2017	N/A
Kjartan's spies infiltrate the Cumberland camp. Uhtred is attacked, but saved by his warriors. Hild goes on a journey of self-discovery as she considers exchanging her life as a nun for that of a warrior, and Guthred's efforts to emulate Alfred's conciliatory tactics backfire when his indecision and lack of ruthlessness weaken the Saxons' position. Uhtred and Guthred's sister Gisela discover a mutual attraction while the Cumberland count brokers a truce with Erik and Sigefrid. Uhtred swears loyalty to Guthred as his ealdorman, but Guthred's advisor Eadred convinces Guthred that Uhtred's popularity among the men will eventually lead to Uhtred usurping the crown. Guthred enters an alliance with Uhtred's uncle Ælfric and has Uhtred made a slave, to be sold off. Uhtred's follower Halig refuses to leave his master and is sold as well.
11	3	Episode 3	Jon East	Ben Vanstone	30 March 2017	N/A
Uhtred and Halig are thrown in chains on a ship by the Icelandic slaver Sverri. The lords of the north congregate in Eoferwic, where Ælfric cancels his alliance with Guthred since he will not be supplied with Uhtred's head. Erik and Sigefrid break their truce with Guthred as well, now that he has no backing. Uhtred and Halig are brought to the Norse colony at Húsavík as timber workers. After a failed escape attempt, Sverri has Halig bound to the prow of his ship, where he eventually dies. That spring, Uhtred is brought back to England to be sold to Sven. Young Ragnar arrives and rescues Uhtred, after Alfred gave him the task of bringing his field commander back. Hild nurses Uhtred back to health. Eadred tries to force Gisela into marriage with Ælfric to rekindle the alliance, with a proxy standing in for the missing Ælfric. Uhtred and Ragnar interrupt the "marriage", and Eadred is killed by Uhtred after taunting him numerous times. In Wessex, Alfred confronts Uhtred about the murder. As Ragnar held responsibility for Uhtred, Alfred blames him and blackmails Uhtred into swearing fealty once more to save Ragnar from retribution.
12	4	Episode 4	Jon East	Sophie Petzal	6 April 2017	N/A
The followers of Ragnar the Younger, led by Rollo, gather to avenge the death of Ragnar the Elder. They decide in order to have sufficient men to storm Dunholm, Guthred's men are needed and an alliance is necessary. However, Brida does not want Ragnar's men to die for Guthred, whom she dubs "the Turd". Uhtred sneaks into Erik and Sigefrid's camp and attempts to assassinate Sigefrid. He fails but manages to cut off Sigefrid's sword hand and take him hostage. In order to save his brother, Erik agrees to leave England. Uhtred then presents Sigefrid's hand to Guthred and confronts him about his betrayal. Guthred agrees to support Ragnar's campaign against Kjartan. Uhtred and Beocca infiltrate Dunholm through a secret entrance and let Ragnar's and Guthred's forces into the keep. In the ensuing battle, Rollo and Sven are killed, and Ragnar duels with Kjartan to the death. Thyra upbraids her brothers for not rescuing her years ago, but Beocca soothes her and helps her deal with her trauma.
13	5	Episode 5	Jamie Donoughue	Stephen Butchard	13 April 2017	N/A
Three years have passed since the battle of Dunholm, and Uhtred still serves Alfred as lord of the Wessex town of Coccham. Despite the peace of recent years, trouble is brewing in nearby East Anglia and Æthelwold brings Uhtred a strange tale, along with a proposition that is hard to ignore. Uhtred's continued strong will and latent restlessness create tension and strain during a royal visit from Alfred, and an unexpected meeting with the Northman Erik gives Uhtred more food for thought, although it puts him and Gisela at odds. Meanwhile, at Winchester, preparations for the royal wedding are underway, as Æthelred of Mercia arrives. Beocca confides in Uhtred and is left with an important question to ask.
14	6	Episode 6	Jamie Donoughue	Stephen Butchard	20 April 2017	N/A
Winchester celebrates Æthelred and Æthelflæd's wedding, but the festivities are short-lived as the clouds of war gather and Alfred runs out of options to keep the peace. When rumours swirl, Alfred's distrust of Uhtred deepens and Uhtred is relegated in his duties as the warlord of Wessex. Æthelred is called to step forward, but a fatal mistake allows Erik and Sigefrid to outwit the Saxons. Terror reigns.
15	7	Episode 7	Richard Senior	Stephen Butchard	27 April 2017	N/A
Æthelflæd is missing and Æthelred and the Saxons return to Winchester to break the news to King Alfred, while Uhtred goes home to Gisela with plans to uncover the truth by his own means. Alfred's stubborn determination causes Odda to question whether the will of the king and the good of the kingdom are at odds – will he need to make a choice of loyalty between the two? Uhtred and Sigefrid come face to face for the first time since the Northmen's banishment from Northumbria, and Uhtred is confronted with a decision that will define the fate of Wessex.
16	8	Episode 8	Richard Senior	Stephen Butchard	4 May 2017	N/A
When King Alfred is told the great sum of Æthelflæd's ransom – and the horror that will likely befall his daughter if Wessex does not pay – he feels there can be only one way forward, despite this jeopardizing the kingdom. Suspicions at Beamfleot threaten to unravel the lovers' escape plan, and Uhtred must think on his feet if he is to secure Æthelflæd's freedom and save Wessex. Odda risks everything for the kingdom and makes an unlikely ally, while Gisela and Uhtred contemplate a future as enemies of Alfred. In a devastating showdown at Beamfleot, there is passion, heartbreak, and treachery.

=== Season 3 (2018) ===
No. overall	No. in season	Episode	Directed by	Written by	Original release date
17	1	Episode 1	Erik Leijonborg	Stephen Butchard	19 November 2018
Seer Skade has a vision that Alfred will fall in battle at the hands of Viking warlord Bloodhair. Haesten warns Alfred of Bloodhair's army. He has word sent to Æthelred of Mercia to unite with the forces of Wessex. Æthelred declines and Æthelflæd rallies the troops instead. In Aweltun, Uhtred and his men capture Skade, who was left behind by Bloodhair after he razed the town. Skade curses Uhtred. At Aescengum, Skade tells Alfred he will not see another summer, Æthelwold warns Uhtred of a quarrel between Sigebriht of Kent and the heir apparent Edward, and Bloodhair appears to negotiate for Skade. However, Uhtred pretends to escape with the seer to draw out Bloodhair's army. He meets the Mercians and they join in battle against Bloodhair. Alfred's men arrive and the Danes are crushed between the shield walls, but Bloodhair escapes. In Winchester, Uhtred is told by Hild that his wife has died giving birth to his son.
18	2	Episode 2	Erik Leijonborg	Stephen Butchard	19 November 2018
Uhtred exhumes his wife to burn her body instead, however, he is seen and called for by Alfred. There, Brother Godwin mocks him over Gisela's death and Uhtred accidentally kills him. Alfred attempts to blackmail Uhtred into swearing an oath to Edward, but Uhtred declines and takes him hostage to secure his escape. He makes for Dunholm and falls sick on the way, believing Skade's curse to be responsible. Meanwhile, Æthelwold takes the news first to Æthelred and later to Bloodhair and Haesten, who he hopes will join with Ragnar at Dunholm to create a Great Danish Army. Aldhelm is tasked by Æthelred to have Æthelflæd killed and further weaken Alfred. At Dunholm, Brida temporarily disables Skade’s curse with a Nithstong, and Uhtred recovers. Although questioned by Ragnar’s cousin Canut, Uhtred swears to live as a Dane.
19	3	Episode 3	Andy De Emmony	Stephen Butchard	19 November 2018
Aldhelm warns Æthelflæd of Æthelred's plot and she escapes to Wincelcumb nunnery. At the court, Alfred tasks Beocca with finding a bride for Edward, but Ælswith asks Beocca to decide in favour of Æthelhelm, ealdorman of Wiltunscir. Bloodhair, Haesten, and Æthelwold arrive in Dunholm, while Alfred seizes Uhtred's property in Coccham and orders for his children to be taken to Winchester. Æthelflæd's maid Sable delivers two letters from Æthelflæd to Beocca, asking him to find Uhtred for help. Bloodhair wants to fight Uhtred for Skade, but Ragnar declines. Eventually, Ragnar, Bloodhair, Haesten, and Uhtred decide to join forces against Wessex, although unrest grows amongst Uhtred’s Saxon men. Beocca and Thyra follow Uhtred to Dunholm, where Beocca reminds him of his promise to come to Æthelflæd's aid when needed. Uhtred deserts the Danes, at which point Ragnar gives in to Bloodhair's demand for a duel to the death.
20	4	Episode 4	Andy De Emmony	Stephen Butchard	19 November 2018
Uhtred bests Bloodhair, but Ragnar interrupts the fight, and Uhtred and Skade leave Dunholm. At Wincelcumb, he meets Æthelflæd, while Alfred, having learned of the Great Danish Army through Haesten, sends word to Æthelred to ready his troops. Haesten goes to Wincelcumb to take revenge on Æthelflæd, whom he suspects to be hiding there. When Haesten's men try to take the nunnery, they are surprised by Uhtred and his men. Their numbers decimated, Haesten agrees to negotiate and Uhtred exchanges Æthelflæd for Skade, whom he must now recover to prevent her curse from ruining his life. At the Viking camp, Æthelwold proposes to Canut to dispose of Ragnar, as Ragnar blames the former for Uhtred's desertion, and Canut agrees. Ragnar takes a woman to his tent to father a child because Brida appears infertile. In his sleep, he is stabbed by Æthelwold. Æthelwold prevents him from seizing his sword –– and therefore from entering Valhalla. Finally, Æthelwold sets the scene to suggest that Ragnar’s woman attacked him and he killed her in self-defence.
21	5	Episode 5	Jon East	Ben Vanstone	19 November 2018
As false news of Alfred's death spread across the country, Bloodhair and Cnut take control over the Danish Army in the aftermath of Ragnar's death and continue their march towards Wessex. Brida buries Ragnar and informs Uhtred of his brother's fate –– to walk in the icy cold of Niflheim forever. Uhtred meets Alfred at Æglesburgh, but is denied men to attack Haesten and recapture Skade under the pretense of weakening the Great Danish Army, although Æthelflæd reveals Haesten's true allegiance. However, Edward goes behind his father's back and gives Uhtred his word. When Edward pleads with Alfred for his army, Alfred, though disappointed, decides to give Edward the opportunity to prove himself a worthy successor. At Beamfleot, Uhtred draws out Haesten, but Alfred does not launch his attack.
22	6	Episode 6	Jon East	Sophie Petzal	19 November 2018
Edward initiates the attack. Haesten is defeated but flees the battlefield with Skade. Uhtred returns to Æthelflæd's estate, where he gets into an argument with Sihtric, who frees Danish prisoners and leaves to join the Danes. Meanwhile, Cnut sends Æthelwold back to Winchester to kill Uhtred. At Ragnar's grave, Uhtred reunites with Brida. They set out to find Storri, who they hope will be able to aid them in helping Ragnar cross from Niflheim to Valhalla. On the way, Uhtred and Brida reconcile, as Uhtred finally reveals how he only came to serve Alfred again to save Ragnar's life, who was held accountable by Alfred for Uhtred’s slaying of Eadred. After finding Storri, he explains that Ragnar must be avenged by killing his murderer with a blade soaked in Ragnar’s blood. Brida dispatches Storri and discloses that he had cursed her when she violated him with a branch and killing the seer without breaking their skin is the only way to break a curse. Uhtred and Brida split up, with Uhtred going to retrieve Thyra’s blood –– Ragnar’s last blood relative –– and Brida re-joining the Danes to find Ragnar’s murderer.
23	7	Episode 7	Jan Matthys	Lydia Adetunji	19 November 2018
Uhtred is attacked by Æthelwold's men. He manages to capture their ringleader and sends him back to the Danes with a message warning them of his imminent revenge. Meanwhile, Æthelwold is incarcerated in Winchester. Brida agrees to a relationship with Cnut, just as Edward finally meets his future wife Ælflæd. Uhtred makes for Skade. At Crugland, they are kept by a traitorous thegn, who intends to deliver them to the Danes. They escape by torching the village. Bloodhair and Haesten fight for Skade and with Skade’s help, Haesten kills Bloodhair. Æthelwold is brought before Alfred, who orders for one of his eyes to be taken as punishment for his deeds. Outside the Viking camp, Uhtred reunites with Sihtric. It turns out their argument was staged to trick the Danish prisoners into accepting a spy into their army. They recapture Skade and escape by boat.
24	8	Episode 8	Jan Matthys	Stephen Butchard	19 November 2018
As nobility from all over the country flocks to Winchester for Edward's wedding, Æthelwold and Sigebriht conspire against the ætheling and against Uhtred. In Coccham, Uhtred learns that his children have been taken to Winchester. He drowns Skade in a river and breaks the curse. Alfred, feeling that the end of his life has come, confesses to Ælswith that Edward will need Uhtred in the future, but she does not share his conviction. With the help of his men, Uhtred, still, an outlaw of Wessex, returns to Winchester in secret, where he acquires Thyra's blood. Æthelwold becomes suspicious, but Thyra and Beocca hide Uhtred in their house. Beocca arranges for Uhtred and Alfred to meet. Waiting for Alfred to arrive, Uhtred finds the first version of Alfred's chronicle.
25	9	Episode 9	Ed Bazalgette	Stephen Butchard	19 November 2018
Alfred tells Uhtred about the chronicle and discusses Edward, religion, and Christianity. Alfred admits he wanted to inflict pain on him but confesses that the decision was selfish and irrational, then admits he was wrong and did not give Uhtred the respect he deserved. In the meantime, Ælswith overhears them talking, enters the room, and tells Alfred she does not want Uhtred by Edward's side. Alfred wonders what will come in the future instead. Æthelwold and Sigebriht continue their scheme and start a rumor that Uhtred is nearby waiting to get revenge. Alfred pardons Uhtred. Cnut embraces Brida, but he lies to her about the death of Ragnar. Back in Winchester, Tidman is confronted for harassing Thyra, where Beocca ends up headbutting him. Alfred passes away after Uhtred confirms he will stay to ensure Edward is named king. Ælswith rescinds the royal pardon and Uhtred is locked in a cell. Tidman continues harassing Thyra and she flees from him, hiding in her home. Tidman finds her and sets fire to the house. Thyra manages to kill him with a knife but remains trapped under the floorboards while the blaze continues.
26	10	Episode 10	Ed Bazalgette	Stephen Butchard	19 November 2018
Finan and Sihtric rush to put out the fire but fear that Thyra could still be inside. The fire becomes far worse and, realizing she has no hope of survival, Thyra stabs herself. After that, Beocca rushes to the scene and cries for her. Æthelwold discusses with Æthelred to negotiate with the Danes and let them slaughter Edward and his allies. At the jail, Æthelflæd pleads with Uhtred to leave Wessex, as Ælswith has banished him. Beocca interrupts and gives Uhtred the news of Thyra's death. At the camp, Haesten fires up the Danish army by telling them that Alfred is dead. Uhtred's pardon is upheld by Edward, after which Uhtred sides with Edward as a free man and prepares for the battle. Uhtred confronts Sigebriht before travelling to Bedanford with the Wessex army. Uhtred intends to kill the man who killed Ragnar, using a blade marked with Thyra's blood. On the other side, Brida discovers the name of her brother's killer and sends Jackdaw to deliver a message to Uhtred. The battle begins after Æthelred's Mercians arrive. Sigebriht reaches the battle late as planned and decides to fight for the Saxons. At this point, Haesten sees Sigebriht with Wessex and says that they have been betrayed. A battle ensues and Cnut manages to kill Sigebriht. Uhtred and Brida stare down Æthelwold. He makes a run for it but is cornered and killed by Uhtred. Edward wins his first battle as the chronicles mentioned and Ragnar finally crosses into Valhalla.

=== Season 4 (2020) ===
No. overall	No. in season	Episode	Directed by	Written by	Original release date
27	1	Episode 1	Ed Bazalgette	Martha Hillier	26 April 2020
In Bebbanburg, Lord Aelfric loses half his men in a battle with raiders from Scotland. Finan, Sihtric and Osferth, who have been spying on Aelfric, return to Coccham and tell Uhtred of the attacks. Uhtred plans to strike Bebbanburg before the Scots return and Aelfric has a chance to increase his depleted numbers. He asks Edward for support, but he refuses. Father Beocca and Uhtred’s son Young Uhtred, a cleric, are willing and unwilling accomplices, respectively. Haesten sees that Cnut is moving his men from East Anglia, presumes that they are going to Ireland, and tells Eardwulf who is now commander of Aethelred's guard. Eardwulf informs Aethelred, who sees this as an opportunity to conquer East Anglia. To increase his chances of success, he sends monks to Bebbanburg to buy St. Oswald’s heart, a holy relic, from Aelfric. Uhtred plans to use the monks as camouflage to gain entry to Bebbanburg. King Edward has started to increasingly depend on Aethelhelm, who tells him of Cnut’s move to Ireland. Edward wants the defences along the Wessex border to be increased nonetheless. In reality, Cnut and Brida are planning to invade Mercia, defeat Aethelred and Edward, and take over Mercia and Wessex.
28	2	Episode 2	Ed Bazalgette	Martha Hillier	26 April 2020
Young Uhtred despises Uhtred’s heathen and unforgiving ways. Lady Aelswith informs King Edward that Aethelred’s goal of uniting all of the holy relics of St. Oswald means he intends to break with Wessex and attempt to restore Mercia to greatness. Lord Aethelhelm advises Edward to ignore her concerns. Aelfric decides to sell St. Oswald’s heart in order to raise money to hire men. Aethelred is pursuing Eadith, Eardwulf’s sister, thus far, in vain. Cnut and his army have arrived at Tetsworth in Mercia. Cnut sends his twin boys away with Haesten to keep them safe. Brida admits to Haeston that she is expecting Cnut’s child, but wants to keep the pregnancy secret until the battle with the Saxons is over. Although he had been banished and was presumed drowned, Aelfric’s son, Wihtgar returns to Bebbanburg with his own battle-tested men. Lady Aelswith visits Edward’s first wife, Ecgwynn, and her son and expresses remorse for her past behaviour. Uhtred arrives in Bebbanburg and enters the fortress under cover of darkness. Young Uhtred identifies himself to Aelfric and Uhtred prevents his murder. Uhtred offers to take over the men of Bebbanburg but they decline due to their loyalty to Wihtgar. Wihtgar kills Aelfric.
29	3	Episode 3	Sarah O'Gorman	Charlotte Wolf	26 April 2020
Wihtgar shoots his crossbow to kill Young Uhtred. Beocca throws himself in front of the arrow, saves Young Uhtred, and dies in the process. Uhtred and his men escape to their ship. Cnut has invaded Mercia, while Aethelred rampages through East Anglia. Cnut waits at Tameworthig for a battle with Edward, who is expected to defend Mercia in Aethelred’s absence. Edward wants to wait for Aethelred’s return before going to battle. Aethelflaed thinks that no time can be lost and leaves Wessex in secret to summon Mercian fyrds. Lady Aelswith promises her that if she amasses her forces at Tettenhall, she will ensure that Edward’s army will join her there. Aethelhelm advises Edward to sacrifice Mercia in order to rid himself of Aethelred. Aethelred is camped at Lena in East Anglia and is making progress claiming Viking-held land. Aethelred tells Eardwulf and his sister, Eadith, that he will pardon the disgrace of their family name if Eardwulf ensures that all of East Anglia is conquered. Uhtred is devastated by the loss of his oldest friend, Beocca, and of Bebbanburg. He encounters Haesten, who tells him that Cnut orchestrated Ragnar’s death, and of the invasion of Mercia. He kidnaps Cnuts’s twin boys.
30	4	Episode 4	Sarah O'Gorman	Jamie Crichton	26 April 2020
Father Pyrlig is sent by Aelswith to Wales to ask for help from King Hywel. Uhtred has joined Aethelflaed in Aylesbury. The fortress is attacked by Cnut’s men who want to capture Aethelflaed. Uhtred threatens to kill one of Cnut’s sons. Cnut’s man, Bjorgulf, calls his bluff. Uhtred throws them the decapitated body of a dead child and they retreat. Uhtred lets Cnut’s sons go. Eardwulf realizes he must tell Aethelred of the Viking invasion of Mercia. Eadith sleeps with Aethelred to soften his reaction when he hears the news. Aethelred blames Eardwulf and promises revenge. Aethelhelm tells Edward of Aelswith’s subterfuge in sending Pyrlig to Wales. He confronts her and she tells him that his men will revile him if he lets Aethelflaed die. Bjorgulf, tells Cnut of his son’s death. Incensed, Cnut orders his men to march immediately to rescue his remaining son. The Mercian fyrds and the Welsh battle the Danes at Tettenhall. Aethelred’s army arrives to enter the fray. When all appears lost, Edward’s army determines the outcome. While Uhtred fights Cnut, Brida hears of his betrayal of Ragnar. She kills him. The Welsh take Brida prisoner. She asks Uhtred to kill her, but he refuses.
31	5	Episode 5	Andy Hay	Martha Hillier	26 April 2020
Aethelred is gravely ill from injuries sustained in the battle of Tettenhall. Eardwulf sees an opportunity in Aethelred’s imminent demise. Eadith would prefer if they simply abscond. Eardwulf refuses. Aethelflaed and Uhtred decide to travel to Aylesbury to address the Ealdormen about who is to be Aethelred’s successor. Aethelflaed asks Aethelred to find a suitable match for Aelfwynn to ensure the succession of the crown. Edward arrives in Aylesbury with an army. He instructs Aethelhelm to have his mother publicly rebuked for raising King Hywel’s army, who makes arrangements to have Aelswith imprisoned in Winchester. Aethelhelm tries to persuade Edward to assume control of Mercia. Edward considers betrothing Aelfwynn to Eardwulf. Aethelred tells Eardwulf he will never agree to this. Eardwulf kills Aethelred. Aethelflaed is outraged at Edward’s betrothal plans. He tells Eardwulf to confine Aethelflaed until the betrothal is finalised. Uhtred goes to Saltwic, where his daughter, Stiorra, Aethelflaed’s daughter, Aelfwynn, and Edward’s first son, Aethelstan, reside. He and his men plan to bring them to Ceaster to safety. Eadith helps Aethelflaed to flee. She asks Eadith to find Uhtred and to tell him to meet her at St Milburg’s priory in Wenloca.
32	6	Episode 6	Andy Hay	Martha Hillier	26 April 2020
Eadith finds Uhtred who turns back en route to Ceaster, to meet Aethelflaed. They encounter starving Saxons who are fleeing a plague. To avoid the sites of infection they decide to travel on foot to Wenloca. Aethelflaed waits with Aldhelm at Wenloca but loses heart when Uhtred doesn’t turn up. Uhtred arrives at Wenloca to find that Aethelflaed has departed. Stiorra tells Young Uhtred that she feels more Danish than Saxon. The Ealdormen refuse to confirm Eardwulf’s betrothal to Aelfwynn. He defies Edward’s instructions and sets off with some Mercian men to search for the fugitives. Aelswith escapes from Winchester. At Aylesbury, Aethelhelm bars her entry to the fortress, the gates of which have been closed to peasants seeking shelter from the plague. Edward overrules the Ealdormen and opens the gates, thereby creating a suspicion that he has designs to control Mercia. Brida is a slave in Wales. Her Welsh captors take great delight in torturing and humiliating her. Aelswith discovers that Edward imprisoned Aethelflaed and has sent men to hunt her and Aelfwynn. Eardwulf and Mercian soldiers track down Uhtred and his companions. When they try to capture Aelfwynn, Eadith tells them that Eardwulf murdered Aethelred. Eardwulf flees.
33	7	Episode 7	David Moore	Jamie Crichton	26 April 2020
While Aethelred is being interred in Aylesbury, Father Pyrlig helps Uhtred and his companions to enter the fortress. Uhtred enters the Witan that takes place after the funeral and tells the Ealdormen, and Edward, of Eardwulf’s treachery. Edward tells Uhtred he is a traitor and has him imprisoned. Lord Aethelhelm tortures Uhtred in a failed attempt to establish the whereabouts of Aelfwynn. Edward begins to understand that Aethelhelm is following his own agenda. He sets Uhtred free, dismisses Aethelhelm as an advisor, and instructs him to return to Wessex. The Viking warlord, Sigtryggr, raids the Welsh settlements in search of Brida. She gives her Welsh captors a taste of their own medicine. Sigtryggr, sends a Welsh messenger to King Hywel at Holywell with the severed head of his brother. Edward sees how Uhtred instantly commands the trust of the Mercians. He decides to appoint him Lord and Protector of Mercia until the unrest in Mercia settles down and a young Ealdorman comes of age to be betrothed to Aelfwynn. Uhtred is given a deadline to decide if he will accept the offer. Aethelflaed learns of Edward’s plan.
34	8	Episode 8	David Moore	Peter McKenna	26 April 2020
The Witan approves Uhtred as Lord and Protector of Mercia. He accepts the appointment and as his first act relinquishes the throne in favour of Aethelflaed. Edward is incensed. Aethelflaed takes a vow of chastity to ensure the crown will pass to the future spouse of Aelfwynn, an Ealderman. On this condition, the Witan approves her appointment as Queen of Mercia until such time as Aelfwynn marries. Edward orders his army to take control of Aylesbury. Uhtred leaves Finan to guard Aethelflaed and leaves with Osferth and Sihtric to recruit the help of the Mercian fyrd. Edward realizes he has been outplayed and withdraws his army. Edward and Aethelflaed form an alliance and resolve to send a joint army to East Anglia to keep it under Saxon control. Young Uhtred decides to return to the monastery to pursue his life as a cleric. Brida leads raids on Welsh villages. She wants Sigtryggr to invade Wessex to take revenge on Edward and Uhtred for Tettenhall. King Hywel attempts to reclaim the Deheubarth fortress at night. Sigtryggr is waiting and decimates the Welsh army. Brida captures Eardwulf. He tells them that Edward has left Winchester undefended. Sigtryggr decides to attack Winchester.
35	9	Episode 9	Ed Bazalgette	Martha Hillier	26 April 2020
Aethelflaed is crowned Queen of Mercia. She leaves for Eoferwic with her army. The Danes take control of Winchester. Aelswith, Aethelhelm, Aelflaed, and Edward’s children are imprisoned. Uhtred and his men accompany Aelswith to Bedwyn where she plans to raise Aethelstan. They are ambushed by Vikings led by Haesten, who capture Aelswith, Stiorra, and Aethelstan. They suspend Uhtred, Osferth, Pyrlig, Finan, and Sihtric by their feet from trees and leave guards to wait till they die. Eadith is hidden in the forest, unnoticed by the Danes. She succeeds in killing one of the guards and sets the captives free. Pyrlig is sent to inform Edward. Uhtred and his men set off on foot for Winchester. Eadith volunteers to enter the city to let Stiorra and the others know that Uhtred is near. Eardwulf tells Brida that Stiorra is Uhtred’s daughter. Brida wants to decapitate her, but Sigtryggr protects her. She teaches him about the Saxons and about Uhtred. Brida exhumes the bodies of deceased Saxons. Eardwulf assaults Stiorra and Sigtryggr has him killed. Haesten captures Eadith. Edward attacks Winchester even though the fortress cannot be breached.
36	10	Episode 10	Ed Bazalgette	Martha Hillier	26 April 2020
After thirty days of siege, Edward has still failed in his attempt to enter Winchester. Edward is beside himself. Uhtred believes Sigtryggr will negotiate. Sigtryggr shows Edward his sons and offers him one of them if he retreats. Edward sinks into despair, incapable of making a choice. Uhtred offers himself in exchange for both children. Sigtryggr agrees. Brida wants to torture Uhtred but Sigtryggr prevents it. Uhtred and Sigtryggr discuss a strategy to build a truce. Aethelflaed has claimed Eoferwic and arrives at Winchester with her army. Edward decides to use smoke to conceal an attack on Winchester. His army breaches the door to the fortress. Uhtred stops the battle. Edward and Aethelflaed agree to give Sigtryggr Eoferwic. He asks for a captive to guarantee the truce and chooses Stiorra. She convinces Uhtred to let her go: she wants to be Sigtryggr’s companion. Brida attacks Uhtred and tries to kill him. She fails but vows to be his undoing. Aelswith unwittingly seals her own fate when she tells Aethelhelm that there is a plant in the courtyard, the flowers of which when dissolved in water are tasteless and poisonous. Edward assigns Aethelstan into Uhtred’s care.

=== Season 5 (2022) ===
No. overall	No. in season	Episode	Directed by	Written by	Original release date
37	1	Episode 1	Andy Hay	Martha Hillier	9 March 2022
Several years have passed. Uhtred has been named Lord of Rumcofa (Runcorn) and helps protect the borders of Mercia whilst raising Æthelstan to manhood and training him to be a warrior. While celebrating the Red Month festival, bandits hired by Lord Aethelhelm attempt to kill Æthelstan but he kills two of them before their leader can escape. In Iceland, Brida has become the leader of a fanatical band of Danish warriors who follow her and her young daughter Vibike, now a Seer. They set out to attack England. Sigtryggr and his wife Stiorra rule in Eoferwic while maintaining peace between Christians and pagans. The peace is threatened when Sigtryggr's brother Rǫgnvaldr, thought lost at sea, returns. It is later revealed that he has become one of Brida's followers, and leads an attack on Eoferwic forcing Stiorra to hide. Eadith returns to Rumcofa shortly before Aethelflaed, Aelfwynn and a recovered Lady Aelswith come to visit for the Red Month festival. During the festivities, a castrated young Uhtred staggers into town and reveals that Brida was responsible.
38	2	Episode 2	Alexander Dreymon	Martha Hillier	9 March 2022
As young Uhtred is cared for, Uhtred and his men stand guard in Rumcofa expecting an attack, when news of the fall of Eoferwic reaches them. Uhtred realises that Brida is going after his children as revenge upon him. Brida captures and tortures Sigtryggr, then allows him to leave as long as he brings her Uhtred. Stiorra, having escaped with her attendants into the old Roman sewers below Eoferwic, is forced to watch as Brida tortures and sacrifices the women of the town. In Winchester, Edward is fascinated when the Lady Eadgifu of Kent arrives to petition him to return her stolen lands. He remembers they met as children, and invites her to remain at court. Seeing his own family's influence waning, Lord Aethelhelm seeks to foment war between Wessex and Northumbria by encouraging Edward to attack Eoferwic without Mercian assistance, forcing the king to rely on him for money. He sends his men to the Mercian border towns, ordering them in the name of the King not to assist Uhtred. In Rumcofa, Eadith's arrival in the town is revealed as Aethelflaed seeks her skills as a healer; she has a cancer which she hopes can be treated, but Eadith advises her the treatment has been left for too long: Aethelflaed will not live to see the Spring. Foreseeing turmoil in Mercia if she dies without securing the succession, she forbids Uhtred from taking the men of Rumcofa north, infuriating Uhtred since Aethelflaed chooses not to tell him of her illness. He goes north with a dozen of his own men, meeting an advance force from Wessex Edward has sent to reinforce his sister, whom he is expecting to attack Eoferwic. Finding Sigtryggr on the road and hearing of Aethelhelm's decree to the Saxon towns, they hatch a plan to get inside the city using the sewers.
39	3	Episode 3	Andy Hay	Laura Grace	9 March 2022
Stiorra confronts Brida for the lives of the townsfolk, and demands trial by combat with her. As the Danes make the square and the two face off, Uhtred, Sigtryggr and his men enter the city and free the captive locals, then launch an assault on the invaders, aided by the soldiers of Wessex. In the attack, Vibike dies while falling from a bell tower but a grief stricken Brida manages to escape with the shattered remains of her forces, although she manages to capture Father Pyrlig during her escape. Rǫgnvaldr, seeing the tide of battle turn, attempts to gain favour with his brother by joining Sigtryggr, but he is captured and imprisoned. The battle won, Sigtryggr believes Mercia has abandoned their truce by not helping retake the town, and urges Uhtred to swear loyalty to him and abandon the Saxon kingdoms. Uhtred however is intent on tracking down Brida until Finan reveals Aethelflaed's sickness. Uhtred and his men make haste to return to Aylesbury to see her before she dies. At a loss with how to deal with Rǫgnvaldr, Stiorra decides to offer him either a quick death, or trial under Dane law; Rǫgnvaldr chooses the trial, and must gain the gods' blessing by lifting a bar of metal from a boiling cauldron with his bare hands and carrying it nine steps without dropping it. In Aylesbury, a weakening Aethelflaed intends to name her daughter Aelfwynn as her successor, however in Winchester Aethelhelm plots to have his own grandson Ælfweard named King of Mercia, intending for him to rule as king of both Mercia and Wessex. Overhearing the plot, Eadgifu informs Edward.
40	4	Episode 4	Paul Wilmshurst	James Smythe	9 March 2022
Uhtred reaches Aylesbury in time to see Aethelflaed one last time, and the two share a last sunset before she closes her eyes in his arms, while sharing a kiss with him. Edward also arrives in Aylesbury with Aethelhelm and a contingent of soldiers, and assures Aelfwynn of his intention to fulfil the dream of King Alfred, although those intentions remain vague. As Aelswith prays in the chapel, she fears that God has forsaken her. In Eoferwic, Rǫgnvaldr passes the test of carrying the metal but must wait outside the city for three full days; if his hands begin to heal by the third day, he will have earned the gods' forgiveness. Sigtryggr agonises over his brother's punishment, although Stiorra insists he must not show weakness. Rǫgnvaldrs hands do begin to heal, but Sigtryggr remains ambiguous about his brother's fate, acknowledging only that he is his blood. On the road north into Yorkshire, Brida remains mad with grief at the death of her daughter and tortures Pyrlig. She begins questioning him about his faith, and attempts to bargain with him to restore Vibike in exchange for the lives of her remaining followers, but Pyrlig tells her that God cannot trade lives. While her followers desert her, Brida and Pyrlig talk of their faiths, and resolve their differences somewhat before burying Vibike. Back in Aylesbury, news of Aethelflaed's death is announced. As the Eoldormen assemble to decide the succession Edward has them killed, rightly deducing that Aethelhelm has bribed them to reject Aelfwynn's claim. Instead of supporting his niece however he declares himself King of Mercia, as well as King of all Saxons and Angles. Aelswith quickly escorts Aelfwynn from the palace to safety as Edward takes the throne. Æthelstan confronts his father about the bloodshed, but Edward counters that sometimes a few must die in order for many to live; by seizing the throne he has prevented a possible civil war which Aelfwynn would have been too weak to prevent.
41	5	Episode 5	Paul Wilmshurst	Martha Hillier	9 March 2022
Edward attempts to placate the people of Mercia with penance for the death of the Ealdormen and fasting, meanwhile news of the slaughter at Aylesbury reaches Eoferwic. Sigtryggr is deeply troubled by Edward's actions, seeing them as the methods of a bloodthirsty ruler intent on war. He sends a rider south to warn Edward not to approach Eoferwic. Aelfwynn and Aelswith take shelter at Buxton where Aelswith reveals her plan to marry Aelfwynn to Cynlaef, one of Uhtred's men who Aelfwynn has been involved with; she believes if Aelfwynn marries a commoner, she cannot be perceived as a threat or used for political gain. Queen Ælfflæd, seeking solace in her faith as she sees her marriage to Edward fail, secretly travels north to Lindesfarne in the company of a Christian visionary named Aalys. Unbeknownst to them, Aethelhelm has sent men after Aalys to murder her and place blame on the Danes; in this way he hopes to foment a war between the Danes and the Saxons which would leave Edward dead, the Danes defeated and the throne open for his grandson Ælfweard. The women are ambushed and Ælfflæd is mistaken for Aalys and killed. Haesten discovers the aftermath, as well as the surviving Aalys, and orders the bodies concealed, then travels to Rumcofa to inform Uhtred. As news of the ambush spreads, both Danes and Saxons blame each other for trying to start a war. Uhtred and his men desperately try to uncover the truth and prevent more bloodshed, but both Sigtryggr and Edward prepare for battle, encouraged by Aethelhelm who still does not know he ordered his daughter's death. In one skirmish a militia secretly raised by Aethelhelm in Edward's name attacks Rumcofa, and Osferth is killed. When he finally discovers Ælfflæd's death, a devastated Aethelhelm contemplates suicide until his lieutenant persuades him to continue his plan. Meanwhile, Brida releases Pyrlig to return to Wessex. Pyrlig encourages her to come with him to atone for her sins, to which she agrees on one condition: they first seek out Uhtred.
42	6	Episode 6	Paul Wilmshurst	Alex Straker	9 March 2022
As Edward and Sigtryggr depart for battle, Uhtred desperately rides to inform Edward of Aethelhelm's betrayal. A convinced Edward calls off the war and orders Uhtred to inform the Danes. Eadith arrives in Buxton to advise Aelfwynn and Aelswith that they are in danger but Aelfwynn, afraid that Aelswith intends to place her in a nunnery if Cynlaef does not arrive, flees before she can be told. Sigtryggr's forces discover Aethelhelm's army before Uhtred can reach them and they mount a dawn raid across a frozen lake, surprising and slaughtering the Saxons. Uhtred tries to fight his way to Sigtryggr to stop the attack, but Edward arrives and, seeing his own troops slaughtered, leads a counterattack which breaks the Danish forces. Aethelhelm manages to escape and heads for Scotia, hoping to continue his plotting to put his grandson Ælfweard on the Saxon throne. Sigtryggr And Stiorra are captured, but Uhtred begs for their release; Edward agrees, as long as Sigtryggr and his men are baptised and swear loyalty to him. Sigtryggr refuses, and Edward sentences him to death. Sigtryggr declares he wishes Uhtred to be the one to kill him, as being slain by the greatest Danish warrior will be the ultimate honour. Uhtred reluctantly agrees. On the road south, Brida and Pyrlig encounter folk fleeing the war, but Pyrlig chooses not to tell her. Later she discovers his subterfuge; believing he is manipulating her, and disillusioned by the new war between Saxon and Dane, Brida changes her plans and stabs Pyrlig, telling him that if he survives he is to tell Uhtred that she is coming for him.
43	7	Episode 7	Anthony Philipson	Alex Stewart	9 March 2022
As Sigtryggr is given a Danish burial, Edward fears that Aethelhelm has moved south to seize Winchester. Unable to leave Eoferwic in case the locals revolt again, Uhtred proposes that Stiorra be installed as Queen in order to maintain stability and pacify the Danish population. Stiorra initially agrees, but finds she is unwilling to take the oath of loyalty to Edward. Edward banishes Stirorra and her followers and installs Rǫgnvaldr in her stead. Eadgifu reveals to Edward that she is pregnant and prepares to leave court in disgrace. Edward however declares it a sign from God, and weds her immediately, much to the disgust of Ælfweard who sees it as a betrayal of his recently deceased mother. He reveals his intention to Father Benedict to be reunited with his grandfather Aethelhelm, and demands the priest accompany him. Outside Eoferwic, Brida ambushes a Saxon patrol and sends the survivor back with a message for Uhtred to meet her at Leodis. Eadith and Aelswith eventually catch up to Aelfwynn, but the three are captured by Aethelhelm's men and sent north to Scotia; Aethelhelm has brokered a deal with King Constanin of Scotia that he will assist Aethelhelm in an uprising against Edward in order to put Aelfweard on the throne of Wessex and Mercia. In return, Constantin will wed Aelfwynn, claim half the riches of Mercia and a stake in its royal house and gain an assurance that no further Saxon advances will be made into the North. On the road however, the three manage to overpower and kill one of their captors, although the other man is able to flee with Aelfwynn. Uhtred heads west to Leodis, to the ruins of Earl Ragnar's old feasting hall where he and Brida grew up together. After a short and fierce fight Uhtred overpowers Brida and prepares to kill her as she begs for death and release to Valhalla. Uhtred then remembers his early childhood with Brida and realizes that the bond between them is too strong; to kill her would be to kill part of himself. He slowly convinces a heartbroken Brida to forgive herself and start a new life, but just as she accepts Stiorra shoots her through the chest with an arrow.
44	8	Episode 8	Anthony Philipson	Martha Hillier, James Smythe	9 March 2022
Uhtred burns Brida's body then urges Stiorra to return with him to Rumcofa so that they can finally be a family, but Stiorra angrily rejects him, claiming that he has run from his responsibilities all his life and claimed it to be destiny’s fault. Returning to Eoferwic, Uhtred tries to have his men return with him to Rumcofa, but they all disagree; their families have fled to Wessex, and their old lives are now finished. In the north, Aethelhelm and Aelfweard are reunited and hosted at Bebbanburg at the command of Constantin as guests of Wihtgar, Uhtred's cousin. Soon after, Aelfwynn is brought to the fortress. At a banquet, Aethelhelm reveals his plan of rebellion to Aelfweard, who seems uncomfortable but resolved to the plan. Father Benedict excuses himself from the feast and leaves Bebbanburg, headed south to warn Edward. Eadith and Aelswith arrive at Eoferwic with their news, but Edward refuses to act hastily to rescue Aelfwynn, concerned he is reacting too much to Aethelhelm's plans. Aelswith hopes that Uhtred can be persuaded to go after Aelfwynn but he refuses, believing he must put his family first, until Father Benedict arrives with news that Aelfwynn, Aethelhelm and Aelfweard are at Bebbanburg. Pyrlig counsels Uhtred that this may be God's intention, and Uhtred devises a plan; he proposes to Edward that the combined armies of Wessex and Mercia head off Constantin at the Scottish border, cutting Aethelhelm off from his ally, then turning and defeating him in battle. Uhtred will then take Bebbanburg and rule Northumbria in Edward's name, fulfilling the dream of a united Saxon England. Edward rejects the idea however, believing there to be too much risk and proposing instead to appease Constantin by dividing Northumbria between Saxon and Scottish rule, thus avoiding bloodshed. In a show of unity with Uhtred, Lord Aldhelm, Lady Aelswith, Father Pyrlig, Finnan, Sihtric and Aethelstan all oppose Edward's plan. Edward orders the dissenters held at swordpoint, the gates closed and that no one leave the city on pain of death. Lord Aldhelm promises that the armies of Mercia will march for Northumbria at dawn, even if they must break down the gates.
45	9	Episode 9	Jon East	Martha Hillier	9 March 2022
As the armies of Mercia prepare to leave Eoferwic by force, Aelswith convinces Edward of the need to avoid bloodshed. Edward finally relents and stands down the men on the walls. As Uhtred and Aldhelm lead the men out, they are faced with the army of Wessex; Edward has decided to lead the combined armies to Bebbanburg. On the road north the army encounters Cynlaef, who advises them that King Constantin has been spotted boarding a ship, but the thought of him braving the treacherous seas to come to Bebbanburg are dismissed. It is revealed in fact that Constantin has come to the fortress by boat with his household guard while his army marches by land. Realising they have been outwitted, Uhtred realises they cannot besiege Bebbanburg while Aelfwynn is a hostage, so Uhtred proposes a plan where he and a few men will infiltrate the fortress via the cliff path and rescue Aelfwynn. Meanwhile, he recruits Haesten to pretend to be a shipwrecked trader in order to lure Wihtgar down onto the beach, then he will signal Edward to attack. In the fortress, Constantin meets Aelfwynn and promises her that, although they will be married, it will be a union of convenience as he loves another and will not force himself upon her. Uhtred, Finan and Sihtric manage to get inside Bebbanburg, although Finan and Sihtric are captured and imprisoned, mistaken for Danish raiders. Haesten, accompanied by Hild, successfully pose as traders, but are unwillingly taken to the castle where Haesten is linked to the captive Finan and Sihtric. He denies knowledge of them, and is killed without revealing the plan. With the Scots army sighted heading for Bebbanburg, Edward orders the attack before Uhtred is ready. Meanwhile, Aelswith leads Eadith into the forests where she encounters Stiorra and her disaffected Danes, and begs them for their assistance.
46	10	Episode 10	Jon East	Martha Hillier	9 March 2022
As Uhtred searches for Aelfwynn within the castle, Edward's attack falters when the gates remain intact. Learning that his army is close, Constantin orders a general retreat from the walls, allowing dozens of defenders and civilians to escape by the sea gate, including Hild and Aelfwynn. Wihtgar objects, but the plan is a ruse; he orders most of the defenders to the courtyard, planning to sally out against Edward while the Scots take them unawares in the rear. The plan succeeds, and Edward's forces are slowly pushed back to the cliff edge. From the now-abandoned fortress, Uhtred spots Stiorra and rides out to meet her. Stiorra, although she wishes to help, considers the battle lost and prepares to retreat but Uhtred appeals to her and her forces, promising that if they succeed Northumbria will become a new Danish homeland just as their ancestors intended, a place where Saxon and Dane can live together in peace. He states that he, a Saxon raised as a Dane, is proof that they can coexist. As Edward and his army are slowly pushed over the cliff edge, Uhtred and Stiorra lead the Danish reinforcements to take the Scots in the rear. The Saxons rally, and together they drive Constanin from the field. Seeing Wihtgar still in Bebbanburg, Uhtred rushes into the fortress intent on facing his cousin and reclaiming his rightful home. Æthelstan follows him, but finds Aethelhelm and Aelfweard attempting to flee. When Æthelstan challenges Aethelhelm to tell the truth about Ælfflæd's death, he tries to justify the ambush, saying he did not know she would be there. Aelfweard leaves in disgust as Aethelhelm kills himself. After a brief fight with Wihtgar, Uhtred throws him from a balcony to be impaled on a candlestick below. Uhtred's victory is short-lived however, as he exits the hall to find the walls and gatehouse burning. Resigned to his fate, Uhtred is astonished when a sudden downpour dampens the blaze. In the aftermath, Edward declares a great victory and thanks Uhtred for his many services stating they shall feast before Uhtred, newly proclaimed Lord of Northumbria, pledges to his rule. Uhtred, however, reluctantly reveals he has come to an agreement with Constantin: in return for an exchange of hostages including Aldhelm, the Scots king will give up his claims to Northumbria. In return, Uhtred agrees that the region will remain independent, a bolster between Scotia and England, and ruled by neither. Uhtred will acknowledge Edward as their overlord and pay him homage, but Northumbria will not become part of England. Edward is outraged, seeing it as betrayal, but Uthred reassures him that it was the only way to prevent constant Scottish attacks. Northumbria will remain an ally of Wessex, and will eventually become part of England, but not until the time is right; Edward has caused too much turmoil, but eventually a king who can unite all the kingdoms will take the throne. Edward, although still furious, accepts. As Uhtred, Stiorra and Young Uhtred celebrate finally having a home together, Hild escorts a teenage Osbert to Bebbanburg. Osbert questions her about it, but Hild merely hints that the New Lord of Bebbanburg will be able to tell him something about his father. The series ends with Uhtred thinking back on his life and reaffirming his belief that "destiny is all".
