= Magnus Bruun =

Danish actor (born 1984)

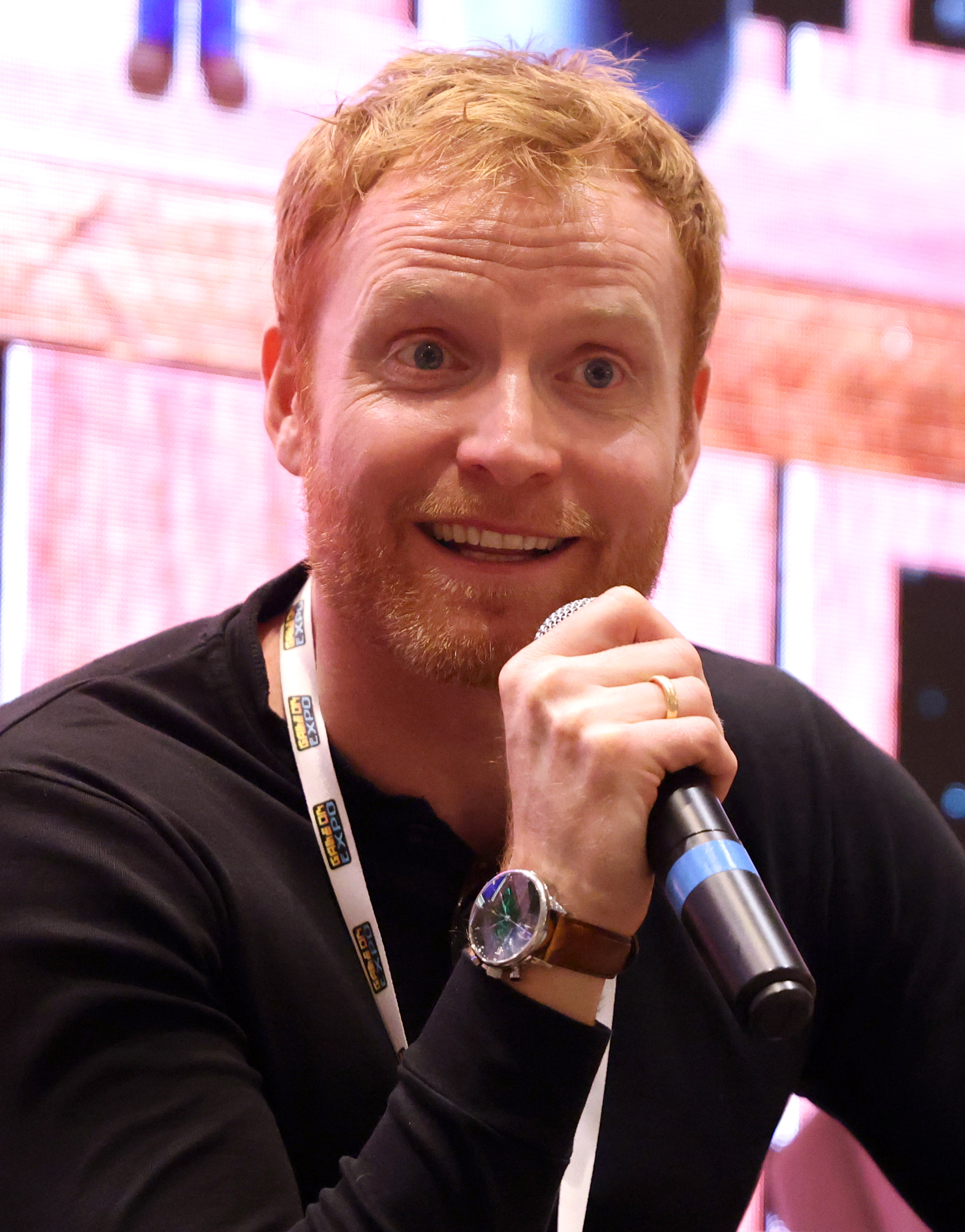
- Bruun in 2025
- Born: Magnus Bruun Nielsen; 3 January 1984 (age 42); Hillerød, Denmark
- Occupation: Actor
- Years active: 2007–present

Magnus Bruun Nielsen (born 3 January 1984) is a Danish actor. He is known internationally for portraying Cnut of Northumbria in the television series The Last Kingdom and the male version of Eivor in the video game Assassin's Creed Valhalla.

== Filmography ==
=== Television ===
Year	Title	Role	Notes
2018–2020	The Last Kingdom	Cnut of Northumbria	
2019	Gentleman Jack	Count Blücher	
2025	Black Mirror	Dieter	Episode: "Hotel Reverie"

=== Video games ===
Year	Game	Role	Notes
2020	Assassin's Creed Valhalla	Eivor (male) / Varin / Odin	Voice
2022	Call of Duty: Modern Warfare II	Klaus Fisker	Voice

=== Web ===
Year	Title	Role	Notes
2021	Geek Dhaba (Podcast by TSF)	Himself	Interview
