= Eysteinn Sigurðarson =

Icelandic actor

- Born: Reykjavík, Iceland
- Occupation: Actor
- Years active: 2015–present

Eysteinn Sigurðarson is an Icelandic actor appearing as Hjálmar in the Icelandic mystery drama series Trapped (Ófærð) and as Sigtryggr, a Danish warlord, in The Last Kingdom.

== Early life ==
Eysteinn Sigurðarson (Sigurdarson) was born in Reykjavík, Iceland, and was raised in Madison, Wisconsin, United States. He attended the University of Wisconsin where he studied English and Creative Writing, before deciding to go into the performing arts. He headed back to Reykjavík, Iceland, to enroll at the Iceland University of the Arts, graduating in 2015 with a BA degree in acting. As a student he performed at the Reykjavík City Theatre on many reproductions of plays including Pippi Longstocking, Who's Afraid of Virginia Woolf? and Mamma Mia!. Sigurðarson also completed a 5-week Improv Intensive at iO Theatre, Chicago

== Career ==
Sigurðarson's debut screen appearance was in 2015 as Hjálmar in the Icelandic mystery drama series Trapped (Ófærð ) In 2017, Sigurðarson landed a main role as Halldór in the Arnaud Siad directed short film Örmagna, which was an official selection of the Reykjavík International Film Festival 2017.

Sigurdarson's breakthrough role came in the Mary Reyndal directed Icelandic television series Mannasiðir (Manners) where he played an Icelandic schoolboy; his performance in the series earned him a nomination for Male leading role at the Icelandic Film and Television Academy Edda Awards. In 2020, Sigurðarson played a main role of Sigtryggr the Danish warlord, in season 4 and 5 of The Last Kingdom (TV series).

== Personal life ==
Eysteinn Sigurðarson is currently living in London, United Kingdom, and is in a relationship with fellow actress Salome Gunnarsdóttir, whom he met at the Iceland University of the Arts, in Reykjavík.

== Filmography ==
=== Film ===
Year	Title	Role	Notes
2017	Örmagna (Short) (En: Exhausted)	Halldór	
2018	Ólgusjór (Short)	Baldur	
2020	The Courier	Curt	

=== Television ===
Year	Title	Role	Notes
2015–2016	Trapped (Ófærð)	Hjálmar	10 episodes
2018	Mannasiðir (TV series)	Einar	2 episodes - Seinni hluti and Fyrri hluti
2020	Devs	Lazlo	Episode #1.1
2020–2022	The Last Kingdom	Sigtryggr	Series 4 and 5

== Awards and nominations ==
Year	Award	Category	Nominated work	Result	Ref.
2019	Icelandic Film and Television Academy Edda Awards	Best Male in a leading role	Icelandic TV series Mannasiðir (Manners)	Nominated	
