= Salóme Gunnarsdóttir =

Icelandic actress

- Born: Salóme Rannveig Gunnarsdóttir
- Education: Iceland University of the Arts
- Occupation: Actress
- Spouse: Eysteinn Sigurðarson (m. 2020)
- Children: 1

Salóme Rannveig Gunnarsdóttir is an Icelandic actress.

== Career ==
Gunnarsdóttir began acting in television- and film-productions in the mid-2010s. After appearing in the short-film Megaphone in 2013, she then joined the casts of TV-series The Lava Field and feature-film Paris of the North, which were released the following year.

Today she is known for her work in film and TV, including Pennyworth, Knightfall, Zack Snyder's Justice League, and The Lazarus Project. She is also known for her work in video-games, such as the roles of Mary Shepherd-Sunderland and Maria in the Silent Hill 2 remake and Lyna in Final Fantasy XIV.

== Personal life ==
Gunnarsdóttir is currently living in London, England, and is in a relationship with fellow actor Eysteinn Sigurðarson, whom she met at the Iceland University of the Arts, in Reykjavík.

== Filmography ==
=== Film ===
Year	Title	Role	Notes	Ref.
2013	Megaphone	Hera	Short film; Credited as Salome R. Gunnarsdottir	
2014	París Norðursins	Læknir	Credited as Salome R. Gunnarsdottir	
2016	Autumn Lights	Liv	Short film; Credited as Salome R. Gunnarsdottir	
2016	Cruelty	Fanney	Credited as Salome R. Gunnarsdottir	
2017	Arnbjörn	Sif	Short film; Credited as Salome R. Gunnarsdottir	
2017	Justice League	Singing Icelandic Woman		
2019	Paperboy	Salóme	Short film; Credited as Salome R. Gunnarsdottir	
2019	Darkness Visible	Lena	Credited as Salome R. Gunnarsdottir	
2019	Valhalla: The Legend of Thor	Freja	Credited as Salóme R. Gunnarsdóttir	
2021	Zack Snyder's Justice League	Singing Icelandic Woman		
2022	The Hanging Sun	Anita		

=== Television ===
Year	Title	Role	Notes	Ref.
2014	The Lava Field	Helena	4 episodes	
2015	Legends	Toma	Episode 2x03	
2017-2018	Hversdagsreglur		6 episodes	
2019	Knightfall	Lydia	4 episodes	
2019-2022	Pennyworth	Patricia Wayne	9 episodes	
2022	La jeune fille et la nuit		6 episodes	
2022-2023	The Lazarus Project	Greta	14 episodes	
2025	The Wheel of Time	Melaine	5 episodes	

=== Video games ===
Year	Title	Role	Notes	Ref.
2019	Final Fantasy XIV: Shadowbringers	Lyna	Voice role	
2020	Assassin's Creed Valhalla	Swanburrow	Voice role; Credited as Salome Gunnarsdottir	
2020	Assassin's Creed Valhalla	Eydis	Voice role; Credited as Salome Gunnarsdottir	
2021	Final Fantasy XIV: Endwalker	Lyna	Voice role; Credited as Salome R. Gunnarsdottir	
2021	Final Fantasy XIV: Endwalker	Athena	Voice role; Credited as Salome R. Gunnarsdottir	
2022	Assassin's Creed Valhalla: Dawn of Ragnarök	Jordeygr Shelter Refugee	Voice role	
2024	Silent Hill 2	Mary Sunderland / Maria	Voice and motion capture	
