= The Last Kingdom (TV series) =

British historical drama TV series (2015–2022)

- Genre: Historical drama
- Based on: The Saxon Stories by Bernard Cornwell
- Developed by: Stephen Butchard
- Starring: see below
- Composer: John Lunn
- Country of origin: United Kingdom
- Original language: English
- No. of series: 5
- No. of episodes: 46 (list of episodes)

Production
- Executive producers: Stephen Butchard; Nigel Marchant; Gareth Neame
- Producer: Ben Murphy
- Production locations: Hungary, Wales
- Cinematography: Chas Bain
- Editor: Paul Knight
- Running time: 50–59 minutes
- Production company: Carnival Film and Television

Original release
- Network: BBC Two
- Release: 10 October 2015 – 4 May 2017
- Network: Netflix
- Release: 19 November 2018 – 9 March 2022

Related
- Seven Kings Must Die

The Last Kingdom is a British historical drama television series created and developed for television by Stephen Butchard, based on The Saxon Stories series of novels by Bernard Cornwell. The series premiered on 10 October 2015 on BBC Two. After co-producing the second series, Netflix acquired the series in 2018. The series concluded on 9 March 2022 after five series for a total of 46 episodes. A feature-length sequel that concluded the series story, titled Seven Kings Must Die, premiered on 14 April 2023 on Netflix.

== Premise ==
=== Series One ===
Produced by the BBC, the first series adapts the first two novels of Bernard Cornwell's series of novels The Saxon Stories, The Last Kingdom and The Pale Horseman. The series covers the years 866–878 where the arrival of the Great Heathen Army in England led by Guthrum and Ubba Ragnarsson redefines the relationship between Vikings and Anglo-Saxons. Following the establishment of Danish rule, Uhtred, a Saxon raised by the Danes, comes to the aid of the kingdom of Wessex and its ruler King Alfred with the hope of eventually retaking his home of Bebbanburg as ongoing Viking incursions attempt to conquer the whole of England.

The eight-episode first series premiered on BBC Two on 10 October 2015 and concluded on 28 November 2015.

=== Series Two ===
The second series adapts Cornwell's third and fourth novels The Lords of the North and Sword Song. The series covers the years 879–886 and deals with Uhtred's quest in Northumbria to defeat his old enemy Kjartan the Cruel whilst the kingdoms of Wessex and Mercia combat the invading Norse brothers Sigefrid and Eric.

The eight-episode second series premiered on BBC Two on 15 March 2017 and concluded on 4 May 2017.

=== Series Three ===
The third series adapts Cornwell's fifth and sixth novels The Burning Land and Death of Kings, although there are significant plot changes from the novels compared to the previous two series. The series covers the years 892–902 and deals with the end of King Alfred's reign while the conflict between the Saxons and the Danes grows after the arrival of the Second Great Danish Army led by the coalition of Viking warlords including Ragnar the Younger, Cnut, Sigurd Bloodhair and Haesten.

The ten-episode third series premiered in its entirety on Netflix on 19 November 2018.

=== Series Four ===
The fourth series adapts Cornwell's seventh and eighth novels The Pagan Lord and The Empty Throne. Similar to series three, there are significant plot changes from the novels. The series covers the years 909–911 and deals with the early years of King Edward's reign over the Saxons, ongoing political struggles in Mercia and the Second Great Danish Army's continued invasion of Wessex that culminates in the Siege of Wintanceaster.

The ten-episode fourth series premiered in its entirety on Netflix on 26 April 2020.

=== Series Five ===
The fifth series adapts Cornwell's ninth and tenth novels Warriors of the Storm and The Flame Bearer, and includes elements of the eleventh novel War of the Wolf. Similar to series three and four, there are significant plot changes from the novels. The series covers the years 917–920 and deals with the disputed lines of succession in Wessex and Mercia, conflict with the remaining Vikings in Northumbria led by Uhtred's son-in-law Sigtryggr, and Uhtred returning to Bebbanburg once more to finally achieve his destiny.

The ten-episode fifth and final series premiered in its entirety on Netflix on 9 March 2022.

=== Film ===
The film Seven Kings Must Die adapts Cornwell's thirteenth and final novel of The Saxon Stories, War Lord, and includes elements of the twelfth novel Sword of Kings, giving a final sendoff to Uhtred of Bebbanburg. The film covers the year 937 and deals with the fallout following the death of King Edward as his disputed heir Aethelstan seizes the throne of England and ignites a war with an alliance of Kings that decides the future of England.

The film was written by Martha Hillier and directed by Edward Bazalgette. It premiered on Netflix on 14 April 2023.

== Cast and characters ==
=== Cast table ===
Actor	Character	Series				
Actor	Character	1	2	3	4	5
Alexander Dreymon	Uhtred of Bebbanburg	Main	Main	Main	Main	Main
Tobias Santelmann	Ragnar the Younger	Main	Main	Main		
Emily Cox	Brida	Main	Main	Main	Main	Main
Thomas W. Gabrielsson	Guthrum	Main				
Joseph Millson	Aelfric of Bebbanburg	Main	Main		Main	
Rune Temte	Ubba Ragnarsson	Main				
Matthew Macfadyen	Ealdorman Uhtred	Main				
David Dawson	King Alfred	Main	Main	Main		
Adrian Bower	Leofric	Main		Guest		
Simon Kunz	Odda the Elder	Main	Main			
Harry McEntire	Prince Aethelwold	Main	Main	Main		
Brian Vernel	Odda the Younger	Main				
Ian Hart	Father Beocca	Main	Main	Main	Main	
Amy Wren	Mildrith	Main				
Charlotte Murphy	Queen Iseult	Main				
Thure Lindhardt	King Guthred		Main			
David Schofield	Abbot Eadred		Main			
Eva Birthistle	Hild	Guest	Main	Main	Main	Main
Gerard Kearns	Halig	Guest	Main			
Peri Baumeister	Gisela		Main	Main		
Eliza Butterworth	Lady Aelswith	Recurring	Main	Main	Main	Main
Peter McDonald	Brother Trew		Main			
Mark Rowley	Finan		Main	Main	Main	Main
Alexandre Willaume	Kjartan the Cruel	Guest	Main			
Christoffer Ertvaag	Sven the One-Eyed	Guest	Main			
Julia Bache-Wiig	Thyra	Guest	Main	Main		
Björn Bengtsson	Sigefrid		Main			
Cavan Clerkin	Father Pyrlig		Main	Main	Main	Main
Arnas Fedaravicius	Sihtric		Main	Main	Main	Main
Christian Hillborg	Erik		Main			
Jeppe Beck Laursen	Haesten		Main	Main	Main	Main
Toby Regbo	Lord Aethelred		Main	Main	Main	
Millie Brady	Lady Aethelflaed		Main	Main	Main	Main
James Northcote	Aldhelm		Main	Main	Main	Main
Ewan Mitchell	Osferth		Main	Main	Main	Main
Timothy Innes	King Edward			Main	Main	Main
Thea Sofie Loch Næss	Skade			Main		
Ola Rapace	Sigurd Bloodhair			Main		
Magnus Bruun	Cnut			Main	Main	
Simon Stenspil	Dagfinn		Recurring	Main		
Adrian Schiller	Ealdorman Aethelhelm			Main	Main	Main
Adrian Bouchet	Steapa		Recurring	Main	Main	
Kevin Eldon	Bishop Erkenwald			Main		
Jamie Blackley	Eardwulf				Main	
Stefanie Martini	Eadith				Main	Main
Finn Elliot	Uhtred Uhtredson				Main	Main
Ruby Hartley	Stiorra				Main	Main
Amelia Clarkson	Aelflaed			Recurring	Main	Main
Richard Dillane	Ealdorman Ludeca				Main	
Dorian Lough	Ealdorman Burgred				Main	Main
Steffan Rhodri	King Hywel Dda				Main	
Nigel Lindsay	Prince Rhodri				Main	
Eysteinn Sigurðarson	Sigtryggr				Main	Main
Harry Gilby	Aethelstan					Main
Patrick Robinson	Father Benedict					Main
Phia Saban	Lady Aelfwynn					Main
Micki Stoltt	Rǫgnvaldr					Main
Harry Anton	Bresal					Main
Sonya Cassidy	Lady Eadgifu					Main
Ryan Quarmby	Cynlaef					Main
Jaakko Ohtonen	Wolland					Main
Rod Hallett	King Constantin					Main
Ewan Horrocks	Prince Aelfweard					Main
Ossian Perret	Wihtgar				Guest	Main
Bamshad Abedi-Amin	Yahya					Main
Ross Anderson	Prince Domnal					Main

=== Main ===
==== Introduced in Series 1 ====
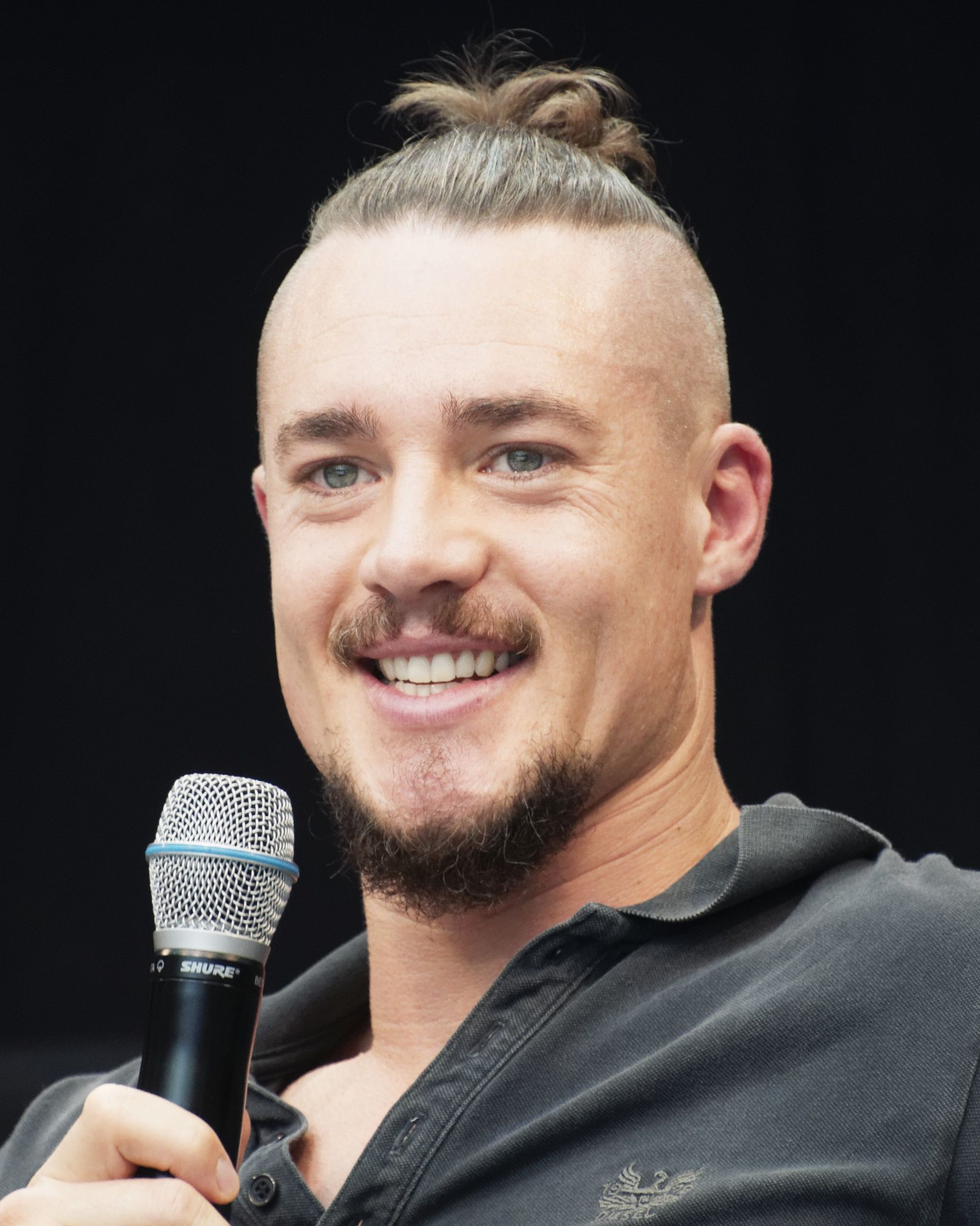
Alexander Dreymon (Uhtred of Bebbanburg)

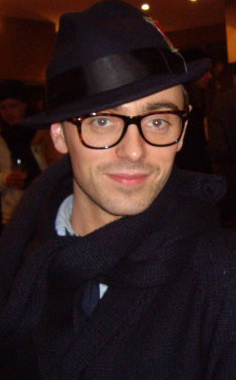
David Dawson (King Alfred)

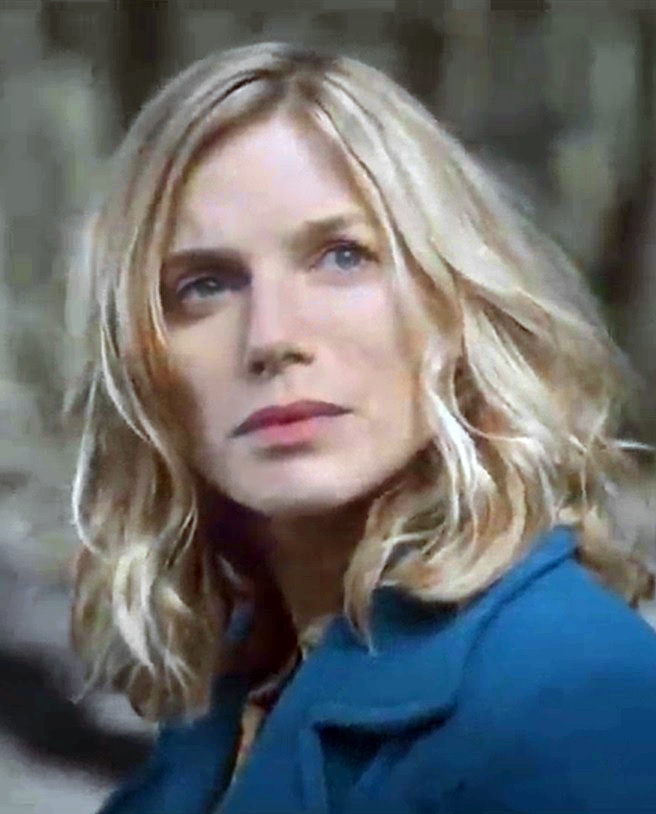
Eva Birthistle (Hild)

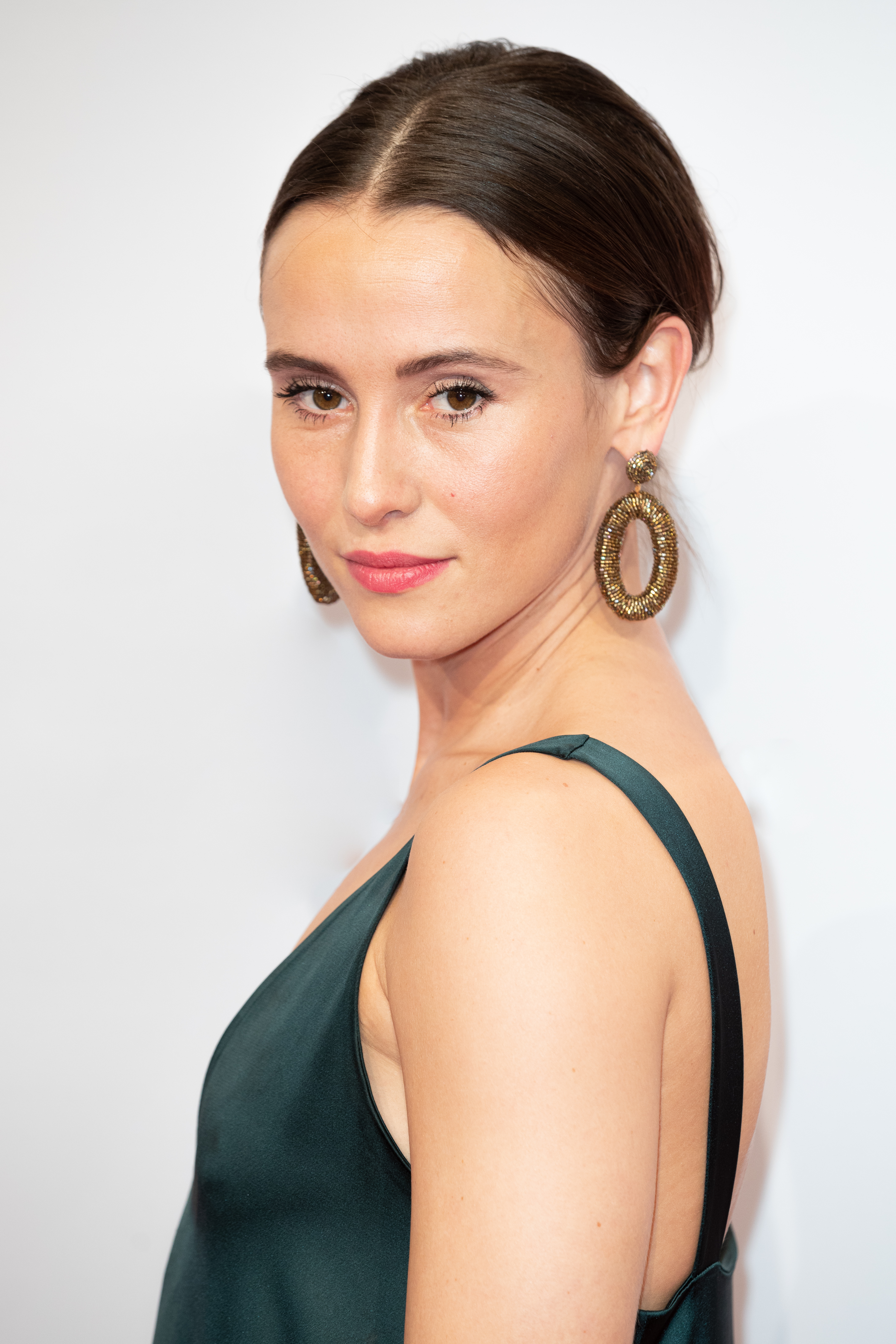
Peri Baumeister (Gisela)

- Alexander Dreymon as Uhtred of Bebbanburg, a Saxon warrior raised by the Danes who desires to reclaim his birthright at Bebbanburg
  - Tom Taylor portrays a young Uhtred (guest series 1)
- Tobias Santelmann as Ragnar the Younger (series 1–3), the son of a Danish warlord and Uhtred's foster brother
- Emily Cox as Brida (series 1–5; guest Seven Kings Must Die), a free-spirited Saxon who, like Uhtred, was adopted by the Danes at a young age
  - Jocelyn Macnab portrays a young Brida (guest series 1)
- Thomas W. Gabrielsson as Guthrum (series 1), one of the leaders of the Great Heathen Army, a large force of Viking warriors that invaded England
- Joseph Millson as Aelfric of Bebbanburg (series 1–2, 4), Uhtred's uncle, who usurps his position as the Lord of Bebbanburg
- Rune Temte as Ubba Ragnarsson (series 1), one of the infamous sons of Ragnar Lodbrok and a leader of the Great Heathen Army
- Matthew Macfadyen as Ealdorman Uhtred (series 1), Uhtred's father and the Ealdorman of Bebbanburg
- David Dawson as King Alfred (series 1–3), the King of Wessex who hopes to unite England against the invading Danes
- Adrian Bower as Leofric (series 1; guest series 3), a skilled Saxon soldier who serves Alfred and works closely with Uhtred
- Simon Kunz as Odda the Elder (series 1–2), the Ealdorman of Devonshire and Alfred's closest advisor
- Harry McEntire as Prince Aethelwold (series 1–3), Alfred's nephew who schemes to steal the crown of Wessex for himself
- Brian Vernel as Odda the Younger (series 1), the reckless son of Odda the Elder
- Ian Hart as Father Beocca (series 1–4), the former priest of Bebbanburg who serves Alfred in Wintanceaster
- Amy Wren as Mildrith (series 1), a Saxon noblewoman and Uhtred's first wife
- Charlie Murphy as Queen Iseult (series 1), the Briton "shadow queen" of Cornwalum
- Eva Birthistle as Hild (series 2–5; guest series 1), a resourceful nun who becomes one of Uhtred's allies
- Gerard Kearns as Halig (series 2; guest series 1), a Saxon messenger who becomes one of Uhtred's allies
- Eliza Butterworth as Lady Aelswith (series 2–5; recurring series 1), Alfred's wife and the queen consort of Wessex
- Alexandre Willaume as Kjartan the Cruel (series 2; guest series 1), a Danish warrior responsible for massacring the household where Uhtred was raised
- Ole Christoffer Ertvaag as Sven the One-Eyed (series 2; guest series 1), Kjartan's sadistic son
  - Andrew Lukacs portrays a young Sven (guest series 1)
- Julia Bache-Wiig as Thyra (series 2–3; guest series 1), Ragnar's sister and Uhtred's foster sister who was kidnapped by Kjartan and held captive for many years. She later marries Father Beocca.
  - Madeleine Power portrays a young Thyra (guest series 1)

==== Introduced in Series 2 ====
- Thure Lindhardt as King Guthred (series 2), a former slave and the pretender king of Northumbria
- David Schofield as Abbot Eadred (series 2), Guthred's closest advisor
- Peri Baumeister as Gisela (series 2–3), Uhtred's second wife and Guthred's sister
- Peter McDonald as Brother Trew (series 2), a priest who serves under Guthred
- Mark Rowley as Finan (series 2–5; Seven Kings Must Die), a fierce Irish warrior sworn to Uhtred and his second-in-command
- Björn Bengtsson as Sigefrid (series 2), a Norse Earl who, alongside his brother Erik, ruthlessly raids settlements throughout England
- Cavan Clerkin as Father Pyrlig (series 2–5; Seven Kings Must Die), a Welsh priest and former warrior sworn to serve the ruler of Wessex
- Arnas Fedaravicius as Sihtric (series 2–5; Seven Kings Must Die), Kjartan's bastard son who becomes one of Uhtred's most trusted allies
- Christian Hillborg as Erik (series 2), a Norse Earl who is Sigefrid's kinder and more diplomatic brother
- Jeppe Beck Laursen as Haesten (series 2–5; guest Seven Kings Must Die), a Danish chieftain who serves Sigefrid and Erik and will do anything for personal gain
- Toby Regbo as Lord Aethelred (series 2–4), the Lord of Mercia who hopes to one day rule England and Aethelflaed’s eventual abusive husband.
- Millie Brady as Lady Aethelflaed (series 2–5), Alfred and Aelswith's daughter, Aethelred's wife and the Lady of Mercia
  - Zsofia Farkas portrays a young Aethelflaed (guest series 1)
- James Northcote as Aldhelm (series 2–5; Seven Kings Must Die), Aethelred and Aethelflaed's closest ally and chief Huscarl
- Ewan Mitchell as Osferth (series 2–5), Alfred's bastard son who becomes one of Uhtred's most trusted allies
- Simon Stenspil as Dagfinn (series 3; guest series 2), a Danish chieftain and Haesten's second-in-command
- Adrian Bouchet as Steapa (series 3–4; recurring series 2), Alfred's chief Huscarl and a fierce warrior

==== Introduced in Series 3 ====
- Timothy Innes as King Edward (series 3–5), Alfred and Aelswith's son who succeeds his father as King of the Anglo-Saxons
- Thea Sofie Loch Næss as Skade (series 3), a skald and supposed sorceress loyal to Bloodhair
- Ola Rapace as Sigurd Bloodhair (series 3), a merciless leader of the Second Great Danish Army who believes it's his destiny to overthrow King Alfred
- Magnus Bruun as Cnut (series 3–4), a powerful Danish warlord, cousin of Ragnar and a leader of the Second Great Danish Army who plans to conquer Wessex
- Adrian Schiller as Ealdorman Aethelhelm (series 3–5), the richest man in Wessex who schemes to put his future grandchildren on the throne of England
- Kevin Eldon as Bishop Erkenwald (series 3), the Bishop of Lunden
- Amelia Clarkson as Lady Aelflaed (series 4–5; recurring series 3), Edward's wife, Aethelhelm's daughter and the queen consort of Wessex
- Phia Saban as Lady Aelfwynn (series 5), Aethelred and Aethelflaed's daughter and the heir to Mercia
  - Annamária Bitó (guest series 3) and Helena Albright (recurring series 4) portray a young Aelfwynn

==== Introduced in Series 4 ====
- Jamie Blackley as Eardwulf (series 4), a disgraced Mercian nobleman and the commander of Aethelred's household troops
- Stefanie Martini as Eadith (series 4–5), Aethelred's mistress and Eardwulf's younger sister
- Finn Elliott as Uhtred Uhtredson (series 4–5), Uhtred and Gisela's devout son who disagrees with his father's actions and pagan beliefs
- Ruby Hartley as Stiorra (series 4–5), Uhtred's and Gisela's daughter who takes after her father and prefers to associate with Danes
- Richard Dillane as Ealdorman Ludeca (series 4), an Ealdorman of Mercia and part of a Witan to decide Mercia's future ruler
- Dorian Lough as Ealdorman Burgred (series 4–5), an Ealdorman of Mercia who wishes to see his son become the Lord of Mercia
- Steffan Rhodri as King Hywel Dda (series 4; Seven Kings Must Die), the Welsh King of Deheubarth who despises the Saxons
- Nigel Lindsay as Prince Rhodri (series 4), Hywel's younger brother and second-in-command
- Eysteinn Sigurðarson as Sigtryggr (series 4–5), the grandson of Ivar the Boneless and a cunning Norse–Gael warlord forced out of Irland
- Harry Gilby as Aethelstan (series 5; Seven Kings Must Die), King Edward's illegitimate elder son and a disputed heir to the throne of England who is under Uhtred's protection while he's trained to become a warrior
  - Caspar Griffiths portrays a young Aethelstan (recurring series 4)
- Ewan Horrocks as Prince Aelfweard (series 5; Seven Kings Must Die), Edward and Aelflaed's son and the disputed heir to the throne of England
  - Marcell Zsolt Halmy portrays a young Aelfweard (recurring series 4)
- Ossian Perret as Wihtgar (series 5; guest series 4), Aelfric's son and Uhtred's cousin who returns to England after having been banished for many years, seeking Bebbanburg for himself

==== Introduced in Series 5 ====
- Patrick Robinson as Father Benedict (series 5), a travelling priest from Rome with heavy gambling debts
- Micki Stoltt as Rǫgnvaldr (series 5), Sigtryggr's sly brother who was believed to have died at sea
- Harry Anton as Bresal (series 5), a skilled mercenary and spy sworn to Aethelhelm
- Sonya Cassidy (series 5) and Elaine Cassidy (Seven Kings Must Die) as Lady Eadgifu, a noblewoman from Cent who attracts Edward's affection
- Ryan Quarmby as Cynlaef (series 5), a young Saxon warrior and close friend of Aethelstan and Aelfwynn
- Jaakko Ohtonen as Wolland (series 5), Sigtryggr and Stiorra's second-in-command
- Rod Hallett as King Constantin (series 5; Seven Kings Must Die), the King of Alba who raids the Northumbrian lands on his borders
- Bamshad Abedi-Amin as Yahya (series 5), Wihtgar's second-in-command whom he met while travelling the known world
- Ross Anderson as Prince Domnal (series 5; Seven Kings Must Die), the nephew of Constantin and the heir to the throne of Alba
- Ilona Chevakova as Ingrith (Seven Kings Must Die; recurring series 5), Finan's wife who claims to experience prophetic visions
- Jacob Dudman as Osbert (Seven Kings Must Die), Uhtred's youngest child and the heir to Bebbanburg who reunited with his father after spending many years in hiding
  - Olly Rhodes portrays a young Osbert (guest series 5)

==== Introduced in Seven Kings Must Die ====
- Laurie Davidson as Ingilmundr (Seven Kings Must Die), Aethelstan's closest advisor and a Dane who was converted to Christ

=== Supporting ===
==== Introduced in Series 1 ====
- Henning Valin Jakobsen as Storri the Sorcerer
- Rutger Hauer as Ravn
- Peter Gantzler as Earl Ragnar
- Jason Flemyng as King Edmund
- Alec Newman as King Aethelred
- Lorcan Cranitch as Father Selbix
- Victor McGuire as Oswald
- Sean Gilder as Wulfhere
- Nicholas Rowe as Brother Asser
- Jonas Malmsjö as Skorpa of the White Horse
- Paul Ritter as King Peredur

==== Introduced in Series 2 ====
- Erik Madsen as Fiske
- Ingar Helge Gimle as Gelgill
- Marc Rissmann as Tekil
- Richard Rankin as Father Hrothweard
- Tibor Milos Krisko as Rypere
- Magnus Samuelsson as Clapa
- Christopher Sciueref as Jonis
- Jóhannes Haukur as Sverri
- Anthony Cozens as Aidan
- Henrik Lundström as Rollo
- Oengus MacNamara as Bjorn
- Klara Tolnai as Sidgeflaed, Sihtric's wife

==== Introduced in Series 3 ====
- Ed Birch as Sigebriht
- Julia Brown as Ecgwynn
- Ian Conningham as Offa
- Tygo Gernandt as Jackdaw
- Jon Furlong as Brother Godwin
- Debbie Chazen as Sable
- Anton Saunders as Godric
- Ciáran Owens as Tidman
- Daniel Tuite as Brother Hubert
- Bernard Cornwell as Beornheard
- Lee Boardman as Guthlac

==== Introduced in Series 4 ====
- Máté Haumann as Cenric
- Gabriel Harland as Cnut's Son
- Tristan Harland as Esgar
- Kirill Bánfalvi as Burgred's Son
- Richard Heap as Brother Oswi
- Nicholas Asbury as Brother Iestyn
- Oscar Skagerberg as Bjorgulf
- Antal Leisen as Creoda
- Kimberley Wintle as Taetan

==== Introduced in Series 5 ====
- Emili Akhchina as Vibeke
- Lara Steward as Hella
- Kathy Peacock as Aalys

==== Introduced in Seven Kings Must Die ====
- Pekka Strang as King Anlaf
- Ingrid García-Jonsson as Brand
- Agnes Born as Astrid
- Zak Sutcliffe as Prince Edmund
- Steph Bramwell as Lady Wassa
- Tom Christian as Dunstan
- John Buick as King Owain
- Nick Wittman as Eamon

== Episodes ==
Series	Episodes	Originally released		
Series	Episodes	First released	Last released	Network
1	8	10 October 2015	28 November 2015	BBC Two
2	8	16 March 2017	4 May 2017	BBC Two
3	10	19 November 2018		Netflix
4	10	26 April 2020		Netflix
5	10	9 March 2022		Netflix

== Production ==
=== Development ===
The series started shooting in November 2014. It was produced by Carnival Films for BBC Two and BBC America. Nick Murphy (Prey, Occupation) served as co-executive producer and directed multiple episodes. For portrayals of the Vikings at sea, the Viking ship replica Havhingsten fra Glendalough was used. The series was filmed primarily in Hungary, with most scenes at the eight acres near Budapest owned by Korda Studios with its Medieval Village Set and surrounding mountains, forests and lakes. Other filming locations in Hungary included Esztergom and Velence

Filming for the second series began in Budapest in June 2016. Richard Rankin, Gerard Kearns, Thure Lindhardt, Millie Brady, Erik Madsen, and Peter McDonald joined the cast. In August 2016, Aftonbladet reported that Swedish actors Björn Bengtsson and Magnus Samuelsson would join the main cast. Also that month, it was reported that Stephen Butchard would return as the sole script writer and that Netflix had signed on as an international co-production partner for the second series.

In April 2018, Netflix confirmed that a third series was in production, based on the books The Lords of the North and Sword Song, which would air exclusively on the streaming service, and Bernard Cornwell indicated that he had been offered a cameo appearance. Swedish actor Ola Rapace joined the cast for series 3, as Jarl Harald Bloodhair. Swedish director Erik Leijonborg was behind the camera for series 3; he has collaborated with Rapace on several Swedish TV series.

On 26 December 2018, the series was renewed for a fourth series by Netflix. On 7 July 2020, the series was renewed for a fifth series by Netflix. On 30 April 2021, it was announced that the series would conclude with the fifth series. Filming for series 5 wrapped in June 2021.

The final series was followed by a feature-length film titled Seven Kings Must Die, which completed filming on 19 March 2022. It premiered on Netflix on 14 April 2023.

=== Historical background ===
The main events of the reign of Alfred the Great and his heirs are well recorded, and a number of men called Uhtred ruled from Bamburgh Castle, most notably Uhtred the Bold more than a century later. The people identified as "Danes" came from many places in and around Denmark, including Southern Sweden and Norway. Historians believe that the Danish invaders of Northumbria came from Jutland in Denmark, as mentioned in Cornwell's books, as well as some of the Danish islands and East Denmark (present-day southern Sweden).

== Release ==
The first series of eight episodes premiered on 10 October 2015 in the United States on BBC America, and was broadcast shortly after in the United Kingdom on BBC Two on 22 October 2015. It became available online in the United States via Netflix on 6 July 2016. It was added to Netflix on 28 December 2015 in the following countries: Australia, Austria, Canada, Germany, Japan, New Zealand, Portugal, Spain and Switzerland. The first series was broadcast in Catalonia on TV3 on 24 July 2017.

The second and third series were released on Netflix in the US, Canada, Denmark, The Netherlands, Switzerland, Germany, Austria, Spain, Japan, Australia, and Portugal.

Netflix was the sole distributor of the third series of ten episodes, produced by Carnival Films. On 26 December 2018, Netflix renewed the show for a fourth series, released on 26 April 2020 and once again produced by Carnival Films. It was renewed for a fifth and final series on 7 July 2020. On 9 February 2022, it was announced that the fifth series would be released on 9 March 2022.

== Reception ==
The series has been met with a positive critical response, with praise for its cast performances, cinematography, writing, directing, and action sequences. On Rotten Tomatoes, series one holds an 87% approval rating based on reviews from 31 critics, with an average of 7.61/10. The website's critical consensus reads, "The Last Kingdom fuses beautiful cinematography and magnificent action sequences to create highly gratifying historical drama". On Metacritic, series 1 has a score of 78/100 based on 15 reviews. On Rotten Tomatoes, the second series received an 86% approval rating based on 7 reviews, with an average rating of 6/10, while the third series received a 100% approval rating based on 7 reviews, with an average rating of 9/10.

Sam Wollaston reviewed the first episode in The Guardian and warned, "It's wise not to get too attached to anyone in The Last Kingdom". Charlotte Runcie gave the opening episode four out of five in The Daily Telegraph, writing that the series had "satisfyingly high production values, a bloodthirsty appetite for violence and a proper cliffhanger." Wollaston and Runcie both remarked on the similarities between The Last Kingdom and Game of Thrones. Kari Croop of Common Sense Media also gave the series 4/5 stars, writing: "With high production values, strong writing, and compelling characters, this series rivals some of the best and bloodiest epics on TV". Dennis Perkins of The A.V. Club gave the first series a grade of B+, writing: "BBC America's sprawling, arresting eight-part historical miniseries The Last Kingdom proves that there's room enough on television for more than one Viking invasion."

Sean O'Grady in The Independent found that some of the language gave the series "a satisfyingly earthy quality", but he thought that the plot was "a little convoluted". The television reviewer for Private Eye was more critical, arguing that The Last Kingdom demonstrates how Game of Thrones "haunts the BBC", and that the series was directly derivative of both fantasy series and European dramas such as The Killing and Wallander, yet lacking the features that have made such series successful.
