= Heartlock =

- Film poster
- Directed by: Jon Kauffman
- Written by: Jon Kauffman; Chris Cummings
- Produced by: Veronica Nickel
- Starring: Alexander Dreymon; Lesley-Ann Brandt; Erik LaRay Harvey
- Cinematography: David Vollrath
- Edited by: Dominic LaPerriere
- Music by: Paul Wiancko
- Production company: Midnight Crew
- Distributed by: Dark Star Pictures
- Release date: January 25, 2019
- Running time: 96 minutes
- Country: United States
- Language: English

Heartlock is a 2019 American romantic crime drama film directed by Jon Kauffman and starring Alexander Dreymon, Lesley-Ann Brandt and Erik LaRay Harvey. It is Kauffman's feature directorial debut.

== Cast ==
- Alexander Dreymon
- Lesley-Ann Brandt
- Erik LaRay Harvey
- Cedric Young
- Wayne David Parker
- Javon Anderson

== Release ==
The film was released in theaters in the United States and on VOD on January 25, 2019.

== Reception ==
The film has a 40% rating on Rotten Tomatoes. Asher Luberto of Film Threat awarded the film a 4 out of 10.

Frank Scheck of The Hollywood Reporter gave the film a negative review and wrote that "this indie drama simply lacks the necessary cinematic tension. Despite fine performances from its lead performers, the film never fully comes to life."
