= Jon Jon Briones =

Filipino actor (born 1965)

- Born: Ernesto Cloma Briones Jr. August 7, 1965 (age 61); Quezon City, Philippines
- Citizenship: Philippines; United States
- Occupation: Actor
- Years active: 1989–present
- Spouse: Megan Johnson (m. 1996)
- Children: Isa Briones; Teo Briones

Ernesto Cloma Briones Jr. (born August 7, 1965), known as Jon Jon Briones, is a Filipino and American actor best known for his work in musical theatre. He played the Engineer in the original casts in the West End revival of Miss Saigon in 2014, for which he was nominated for the Laurence Olivier Award for Best Actor in a Musical, and reprised the part on Broadway in 2017.

== Career ==
While an engineering student in the Philippines, Briones became involved with the original 1989 London production of Miss Saigon. Briones had a friend who was a producer in the Philippines, who asked Briones to help "facilitate an audition" for the Cameron Mackintosh team who were holding auditions in the Philippines for Miss Saigon. In addition to helping with the organization of the auditions, Briones himself auditioned for and then became a member of the ensemble.

He has been involved with various touring productions of Miss Saigon, as a swing and covering other roles, finally playing the Engineer. In 2014 he joined the original cast of the Miss Saigon West End revival, playing the Engineer. He was nominated for the Laurence Olivier Award for Best Actor in a Musical for playing this role and won the Whatsonstage.com Award for Best Actor in a Musical. He remained in the role until the production closed on February 27, 2016. In 2017, Briones transferred with the production to Broadway at the Broadway Theatre. Previews started on March 1, 2017, with an official opening on March 23.

On April 30, 2019, Briones received the Visionary Award from East West Players during their annual awards dinner and silent auction. The award is given to celebrate individuals that are able to raise the visibility of Asian Pacific Americans through their work. During his acceptance speech, Briones said that his "vision is that we change hearts and minds in Hollywood and in the theatre community so they see that we have a voice and a story – beautiful stories – to tell, and we are the ones who can and should tell it."

In 2018, he appeared in The Assassination of Gianni Versace: American Crime Story as Modesto Cunanan, father of Gianni Versace's murderer, Andrew Cunanan, and in American Horror Story: Apocalypse as Ariel Augustus. In 2020, Briones appeared in the Netflix drama series Ratched, portraying Dr. Richard Hanover. In 2022, Briones appeared in the second season of Star Trek: Picard. His daughter, Isa Briones, is a main cast member on the series.

In 2023, Jon Jon Briones played the role of Joseph in the movie 'The Last Voyage of the Demeter.' This drama/horror film tells the story of the crew of the merchant ship Demeter, who sail towards London to deliver a cargo of 50 unmarked wooden crates, only to discover that they are not alone. The presence of Dracula haunts them throughout the entire ship. In March 2024, Briones joined the cast of Hadestown on Broadway, portraying Hermes. He starred opposite his daughter, who made her Broadway debut as Eurydice.

== Personal life ==
Briones was born in Quezon City, Philippines and became a United States citizen in 2010. In 1996, he married Megan Johnson. They have two children: Isa (b. 1999) and Teo (b. 2005). His wife and both children are also actors.

== Filmography ==
=== Film ===
Year	Title	Role	Notes
2007	Potluck		Short film
2008	Proud American	Dawn's Father	
2008	An Immigrant Girl's Journey	Paulo Alcedo	Short film
2008	Brown Soup Thing	Uncle Jon Jon	
2010	Breathe	Rhadamanths	Short film
2012	Jolly B. Fierce	Edward Biagan	Short film
2012	Nico's Sampaguita	Raul	Short film
2012	Just an American	Father of Dawn Trang	
2014	Sinbad: The Fifth Voyage	Asian Genie	
2014	Blood Ransom	Father Mena	
2016	Miss Saigon: 25th Anniversary	The Engineer	
2018	Model Home	Mr. Fan	
2022	Beauty and the Beast: A 30th Celebration	Maurice	TV film special
2023	The Last Voyage of the Demeter	Joseph	
TBA	Patron Saints of Nothing	Tito Maning	

=== Television ===
Year	Title	Role	Notes
2003–2004	Las Vegas	Cosme Caliyag	2 episodes
2007	Moonlight	Party Goer	Episode: "Out of the Past"
2008	Sons of Anarchy	Asian Elvis	Episode: "Pilot"
2009	Monk	First Mercenary	Episode: "Mr. Monk and the Magician"
2010	Miami Medical	Technician	Episode: "Diver Down"
2010	Law & Order: LA	Brant Ross	Episode: "Hollywood"
2011	Southland	Rama	Episode: "Graduation Day"
2013	The Mentalist	Mr. Lam	Episode: "My Blue Heaven"
2014	Bones	Adrian Lingao	Episode: "Big in the Philippines"
2017	Criminal Minds: Beyond Borders	Lama Vajra	Episode: "Abominable"
2018	The Assassination of Gianni Versace: American Crime Story	Modesto Cunanan	2 episodes
2018	Designated Survivor	Prime Minister Khallou	Episode: "Bad Reception"
2018	American Horror Story: Apocalypse	Ariel Augustus	3 episodes
2019	Better Things	Himself	Episode: "The Unknown"
2019	All Rise	Daniel Mendoza	Episode: "How to Succeed in Law Without Really Re-Trying"
2020	Ratched	Dr. Richard Hanover	Main role
2021	The Rookie	Aldo Salonga	Episode: "Revelations"
2021	Trese	Hank	Voice role
2022	Star Trek: Picard	Confederation Magistrate	Episodes: "Penance" and "Assimilation"
2022	Transformers: EarthSpark	Alex Malto	Voice role
2023	Class of '09	Gabriel	Main cast
2026	The Beauty	Dr. Dane Dilegre	Guest role
TBA	Avatar: The Last Airbender	Piandao	

== Theatre credits ==
Year	Production	Role	Venue
1989-1992	Miss Saigon	Ensemble	Theatre Royal Drury Lane, West End
1992	Into the Woods	Rapunzel’s Prince	Repertory Philippines
1993	Little Shop of Horrors	Seymour Krelborn	Repertory Philippines
1993	Joseph and the Amazing Technicolor Dreamcoat	The Narrator	Repertory Philippines
1993	Les Misérables	Enjolras	Repertory Philippines
1994	The Wiz	The Lion	Repertory Philippines
1994	Miss Saigon	Swing	German Tour
1995	Miss Saigon	The Engineer	German Tour
1997	Children of Eden	Adult Storyteller	Paper Mill Playhouse
1998-1999	Miss Saigon	The Engineer (Alternate)	Theatre Royal Drury Lane, West End
2000	Miss Saigon	The Engineer (Alternate)	Cultural Center of the Philippines
2001	Miss Saigon	The Engineer	Asia Tour
2002–2004	Miss Saigon	The Engineer	North American Tour
2004–2006	Miss Saigon	The Engineer	U.K. Tour
2012	A Little Night Music	Fredrik Egerman	East West Players
2014–2016	Miss Saigon	The Engineer	Prince Edward Theatre, West End
2016	La Cage aux Folles	Georges	East West Players
2017–2018	Miss Saigon	The Engineer	Broadway Theatre, Broadway
2018	Sweet Charity	Herman	Freud Playhouse
2023	Waterfall: A New Musical	Than Chao Khun	Muangthai Rachadalai Theatre
2024	Hadestown	Hermes	Walter Kerr Theatre, Broadway
2024	Pacific Overtures	Reciter, Shogun, Emperor	East West Players
