= Blood Ransom =

- Theatrical release poster
- Directed by: Francis Dela Torre
- Written by: Francis Dela Torre
- Produced by: Albert Chang; Barclay DeVeau; Francis dela Torre; Kim Coleman; Ted Manotoc; Derrick Santos
- Starring: Anne Curtis; Alexander Dreymon
- Cinematography: Francis Dela Torre; Jasmin Kuhn
- Edited by: Thomas Apolonio
- Music by: Albert Chang
- Production company: Tectonic Films
- Distributed by: Tectonic Films; VIVA Films
- Release dates: October 29, 2014 (Philippines); October 31, 2014 (United States)
- Running time: 101 minutes
- Country: United States
- Language: English
- Box office: P400,000,000

Blood Ransom is a 2014 independent American vampire romance thriller film written and directed by Francis Dela Torre, and starring Anne Curtis and Alexander Dreymon. Blood Ransom was filmed in California between May & June 2012.

== Plot ==
Crystal, a young woman, falls in love with Roman, a criminal. Roman lures her into a life of "sin". One day, she wakes up and realizes that Roman has turned her into a monster. She decides to escape from Roman with Jeremiah, who works as Roman's driver, through a kidnapping plot that goes wrong. Jeremiah and Crystal subsequently begin a love affair and devise a plan that can make her human again. But Roman sends his henchman, Bill, to hunt them down. Crystal is now faced with a choice. She can kill Jeremiah to live, or follow an impossible plan that can turn her soul human again, so that she can be with the man with whom she has fallen in love with.

== Cast ==
- Anne Curtis as Crystal
- Alexander Dreymon as Jeremiah
- Caleb Hunt as Roman
- Jamie Harris as Bill
- Darion Basco as Daniel
- Clifton Powell as Detective Hobbs
- Vanessa Evigan as Anna
- Emily Skinner as Emily Hudson
- Suzette Ranillo as Tita Paz
- Kevin Meaney as Mr. Manningham
- Jon Jon Briones as Father Mena
- Dion Basco as Oliver
- Sam J. Warner as Arnie
- Natalina Maggio as Ianne
- Clayton Rohner as Rich White Guy
- Melody Butiu as Angel
- Carol Jones as Nora
- Alli Cripe as Sasha
- Faleolo Alailima as Bouncer
- Adam Gifford as Max
- Barclay DeVeau as Detective Kuber

== Reception ==
On the review aggregator website Rotten Tomatoes, 20% of 5 critics' reviews are positive, with an average rating of 2/10. Despite generally negative reviews—with the Sacramento News & Review panning the film as "amateurish and clumsy" and the Los Angeles Times calling its story "underdeveloped"—critics commented the cinematography and applauded "the best efforts of [the film's] hard-working cast".

The Village Voice gave the film a mixed review, finding the plot "less than coherent", but stating that the film "often feels older than it is" and that it "hearkens back to when the properties of vampirism had room to shimmer under the eye—when the creatures were less predictable, instead of codified for video-game precision".

The New York Times described Curtis as miscast, but noted that "[i]t would be interesting to see her in a role of more down-to-earth dimensions". On the other hand, the Los Angeles Times wrote that "the film plays like a vanity project" for Curtis.

== See also ==
- Subject: I Love You
