= Horizon Line =

2020 film by Mikael Marcimain

- Teaser poster
- Directed by: Mikael Marcimain
- Written by: Josh Campbell; Matthew Stuecken
- Produced by: Fredrik Wikström Nicastro
- Starring: Allison Williams; Alexander Dreymon
- Cinematography: Flavio Labiano
- Edited by: Chris Gill; Laura Jennings
- Music by: Jon Ekstrand; Carl-Johan Sevedag
- Production companies: SF Studios; Ombra Films; Subotica Films
- Distributed by: SF Studios
- Release date: 6 November 2020
- Running time: 92 minutes
- Country: Sweden
- Language: English
- Budget: US$22 million
- Box office: US$916,042

Horizon Line is a 2020 English-language Swedish adventure thriller film directed by Mikael Marcimain and starring Alexander Dreymon, Allison Williams and Keith David. The film concentrates on a pair that desperately struggles to survive, flying a GippsAero GA8 Airvan plane over the Indian Ocean after the pilot suffered a fatal heart attack.

Horizon Line was released in Sweden on 6 November 2020 by SF Studios and in the United States on 12 January 2021 by STXfilms.

== Plot ==
Sara is at an island bar and is getting ready to head home. She is with a boyfriend and he asks her for one more drink before she goes. He orders, then heads out of the bar (presumably to the bathroom), and she leaves, as she has stated that she "hates goodbyes."

Fast forward one year later in London, Sara takes a cab to the airport to leave for a wedding.

Visiting Mauritius for her friend's wedding, Sara hooks up with ex-boyfriend Jackson, misses the last boat to the wedding venue on Rodrigues, and hitches a ride on a small plane piloted by her friend, Freddy Wyman, who is also going to the wedding. She is surprised when it turns out that Jackson has also arranged to fly with Freddy to the wedding.

Freddy invites Sara to the co-pilot seat while Jackson sleeps. During the flight Freddy has a heart attack and passes away, sending the plane into free-fall. Sara and Jackson recover, but the autopilot is damaged, and they are faced with the fact that Sara, who Freddy has taught some basics, will need to fly the plane to get them to safety.

They manage to contact Samuel, a local air traffic controller, on the shortwave radio, and he attempts to guide them to safety, but they have to fly through a storm first. They manage to get through the storm but not before they damage their compass. The plane is also starting to lose fuel at an alarming rate. Jackson volunteers to climb out of the plane to try to patch a fuel line. While successful, he badly breaks his arm. The pair decides to shed weight, including the lifeless body of Freddy, to save fuel. Sara realises they have several bottles of rum that they can use as extra fuel, and she attempts to manually refuel the plane by climbing out the window. They try to raise Samuel, but the radio is silent. As the plane runs out of fuel, they spot a small island and attempt to glide the stricken plane to the island. The plane crashes into the sea and flips. Sara rescues Jackson, who got stuck at the wing of the submerged plane, and both barely escape and swim to the barren island.

They make it to the island only to discover that it is just a sandbar that will shortly disappear as the tide rises. As the sandbar disappears, they stay afloat, but Jackson, sensing he is sure to die, offers Sara his life vest. Sara declines, telling him they are a team. Jackson professes his love for Sara as they sense the end is near, but just then a fishing vessel that heard their radio transmission arrives to rescue them.

== Cast ==
- Allison Williams as Sara Johnson
- Alexander Dreymon as Jackson Davisen
- Keith David as Freddy Wyman
- Pearl Mackie as Pascale
- Jumayn Hunter as Samuel
- Amanda Khan as Nadia

== Production ==
Principal photography occurred in Mauritius, Dublin and at Pinewood Studios.

Jon Ekstrand and Carl-Johan Sevedag has composed the film score. Sony Classical has released the soundtrack featuring the composers score and an original song by Silverberg and Daniella Mason. The movie had a budget of 200 million SEK (US$22 million), one of the highest ever budgets for a Swedish film at the time.

== Release ==
The film was released in theaters in Sweden on 6 November 2020 and in the United States on video on demand on 12 January 2021, followed by a release on Epix later in the year. The film was released in Taiwan on 31 December 2020, in South Korea on 10 February 2021, and in Japan under the title The story of how I flew a Cessna with my ex-boyfriend and the pilot died on 6 August 2021. Also released in Indonesia on Wednesday, 7 December 2022. It grossed US$916,042 at the global box office internationally.

== Reception ==
On Rotten Tomatoes, the film has an approval rating of 40% based on reviews from 5 critics.

Jeffrey M. Anderson of Common Sense Media rated the film 2 stars out of 5 and wrote: "It has a decent premise and is compact and nicely paced, but this trapped-in-a-plane thriller eventually nose-dives due to uninteresting characters, lack of suspense, and too much preposterousness." John Serba of Decider wrote: "Horizon Line maintains tension for the final hour, and that’s about it. Don’t expect more. A modest goal, mostly met."
