= Alexander Dreymon =

German actor (born 1983)

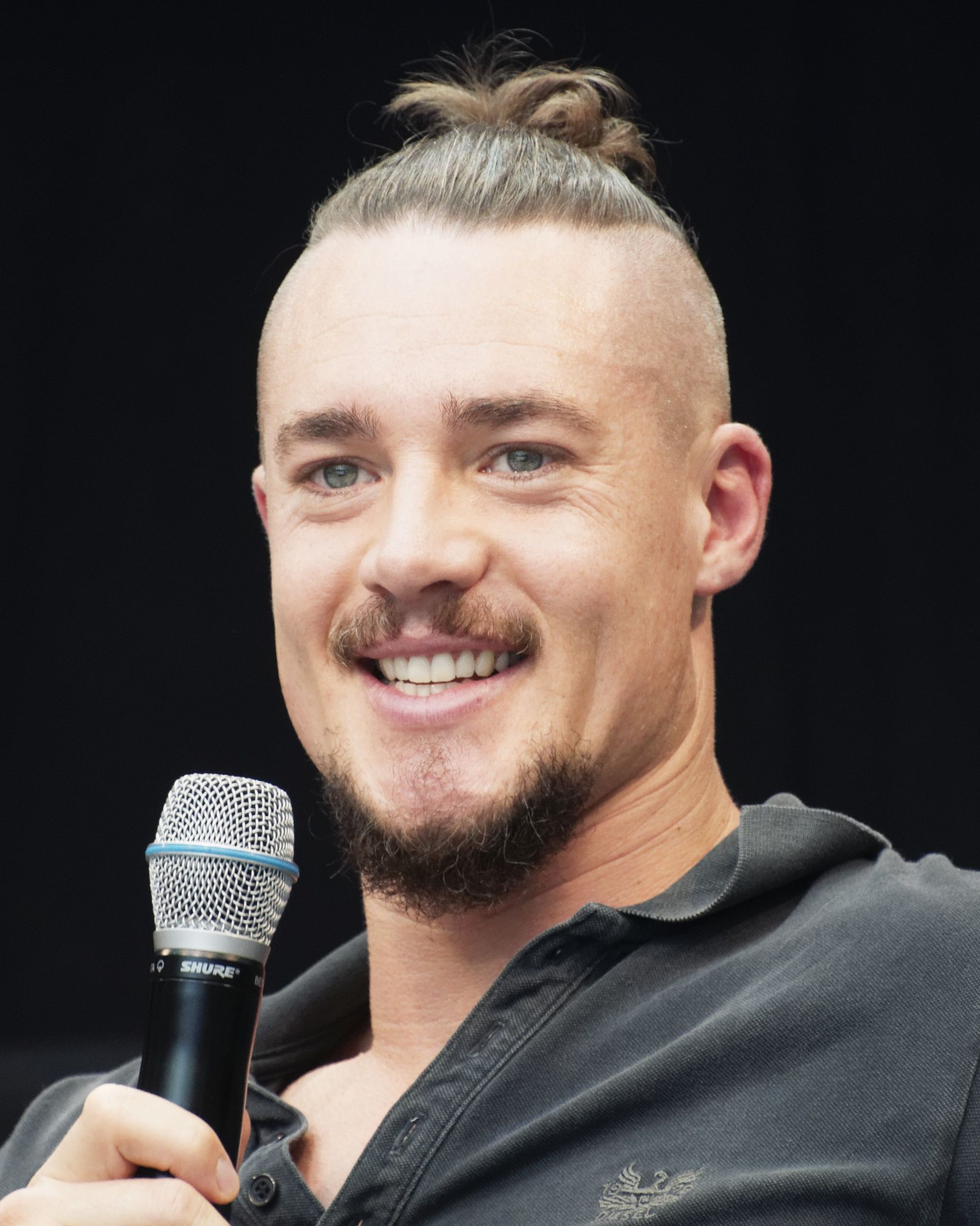
- Doetsch in 2019
- Born: Alexander Doetsch; 7 February 1983 (age 43); Munich, West Germany
- Education: Drama Centre London (BA)
- Occupations: Actor; model; television director
- Years active: 2010–present
- Known for: Uhtred in The Last Kingdom
- Spouse: Allison Williams (m. 2025)
- Children: 1

Alexander Dreymon (born Alexander Doetsch; 7 February 1983) is a German actor. He is best known for portraying Uhtred of Bebbanburg in the television series The Last Kingdom (2015–2022). Dreymon's other notable roles were in Christopher and His Kind (2011) and American Horror Story: Coven (2013–2014). Dreymon also appeared in the 2011 World War II film Resistance.

== Early life ==
Dreymon was born Alexander Doetsch in Munich, West Germany, and grew up in the United States, France, and Switzerland.

Dreymon grew up always wanting to be an actor. He has a background in martial arts and learned to ride horses while living in South Dakota. He studied in Paris, then trained for three years at Drama Centre London.

== Career ==
After training for three years at Drama Centre London, Dreymon appeared on stage in London and Paris before making his screen debut in the French one-off-drama Ni reprise, ni échangée, and later played alongside Doctor Who's Matt Smith in the British film Christopher and His Kind.

Dreymon worked on several independent films in the US as well as portraying Luke Ramsey in five episodes of American Horror Story's third season, Coven.

Dreymon portrays Uhtred of Bebbanburg in the television series The Last Kingdom on Netflix. He also directed the second episode of the fifth season.

== Personal life ==
In late 2019, Dreymon began dating actress Allison Williams. They met while filming Horizon Line. In late 2021, they had a son. In December 2022, it was reported that the couple had become engaged. In June 2025, it was announced that the couple had married.

While working on The Last Kingdom, Dreymon began learning Brazilian jiu-jitsu and in 2024 was promoted to brown belt.

== Filmography ==
=== Film ===
Year	Title	Role	Notes
2011	The Last Fashion Show	Bruce	
2011	Resistance	Steiner	
2014	Blood Ransom	Jeremiah	
2016	Guys Reading Poems	Father	
2018	Heartlock	Lee Haze	
2020	Horizon Line	Jackson	
2027	Wind of Change	Rudolf Schenker	

=== Television ===
Year	Title	Role	Notes
2010	Ni reprise, ni échangée	Alexandre	TV film
2011	Christopher and His Kind	Caspar	TV film
2013	American Horror Story: Coven	Luke Ramsey	5 episodes
2015–2022	The Last Kingdom	Uhtred of Bebbanburg	Main role (46 episodes); also director (season 5, episode 2)
2023	The Last Kingdom: Seven Kings Must Die	Uhtred of Bebbanburg	TV film; Also executive producer
